= Ciudad Juárez migrant center fire =

2023 fire in Mexico

- Date: 27 March 2023; 3 years ago
- Location: Ciudad Juárez, Chihuahua, Mexico; 31°44′48″N 106°29′00″W
- Cause: Arson
- Deaths: 40
- Injuries: 27

On 27 March 2023, a fire occurred at an immigration detention center in Ciudad Juárez, Chihuahua, Mexico, near the border with the United States. The fire killed 40 people and left 27 others seriously injured. According to Vice interviewees, prison officials demanded bribes from migrants to release them and avoid deportation. The fire was allegedly started by inmates when they set fire to their mattresses to protest their detention conditions and impending deportation. CCTV security footage obtained by the press shows INM personnel fleeing the spreading flames and smoke while leaving the detainees locked in their cell.

== Background ==
The migrant processing facility – officially the Ciudad Juárez Temporary Shelter (Spanish: Estancia Provisional de Ciudad Juárez) – is used by Mexico's National Migration Institute (INM) to temporarily house migrants who illegally attempt to cross the border and are liable for deportation. It is located in downtown Ciudad Juárez, near the Rio Grande and adjacent to the Stanton-Lerdo Bridge.

Prior to the incident, tensions were already running high between authorities and migrants in Ciudad Juárez, where shelters were full of people trying to cross into the United States or requesting asylum; in late December 2022, the municipal government put the number of stranded migrants registered in its territory at 20,000. On 13 March, Mayor Cruz Pérez Cuéllar announced a hardening of the city's position with respect to stranded migrants, warning that its patience was "wearing thin". Some of the approximately 70 people in the men's section of the building when the fire broke out had been taken into custody that same afternoon in roundups carried out across Juárez by the INM at the mayor's request in response to repeated complaints from local residents and businessowners about aggressive panhandling and street harassment.

Fire survivors and guards interviewed by Vice described the facility as an "extortion center", saying that prison officials demanded bribes between $200 and $500 to release migrants, and that those who did not pay were deported.

== Fire ==
At 10 p.m. CST, a fire broke out in the men's area of the detention center, with 68 migrants inside. Rescue workers, including firefighters and paramedics, reported to the scene of the fire and at least 21 of the injured were taken to hospitals. According to statements made by President Andrés Manuel López Obrador in a press conference the following morning, the fire was started when the facility's inmates set fire to mattresses in protest at their likely imminent deportation. He added that the inmates who started the fire "never imagined that this would cause this terrible misfortune".

CCTV security footage obtained by the press that shows INM personnel fleeing the spreading flames and smoke while leaving the detainees locked in their cell was received with a "wave of indignation" the following day.

== Victims ==
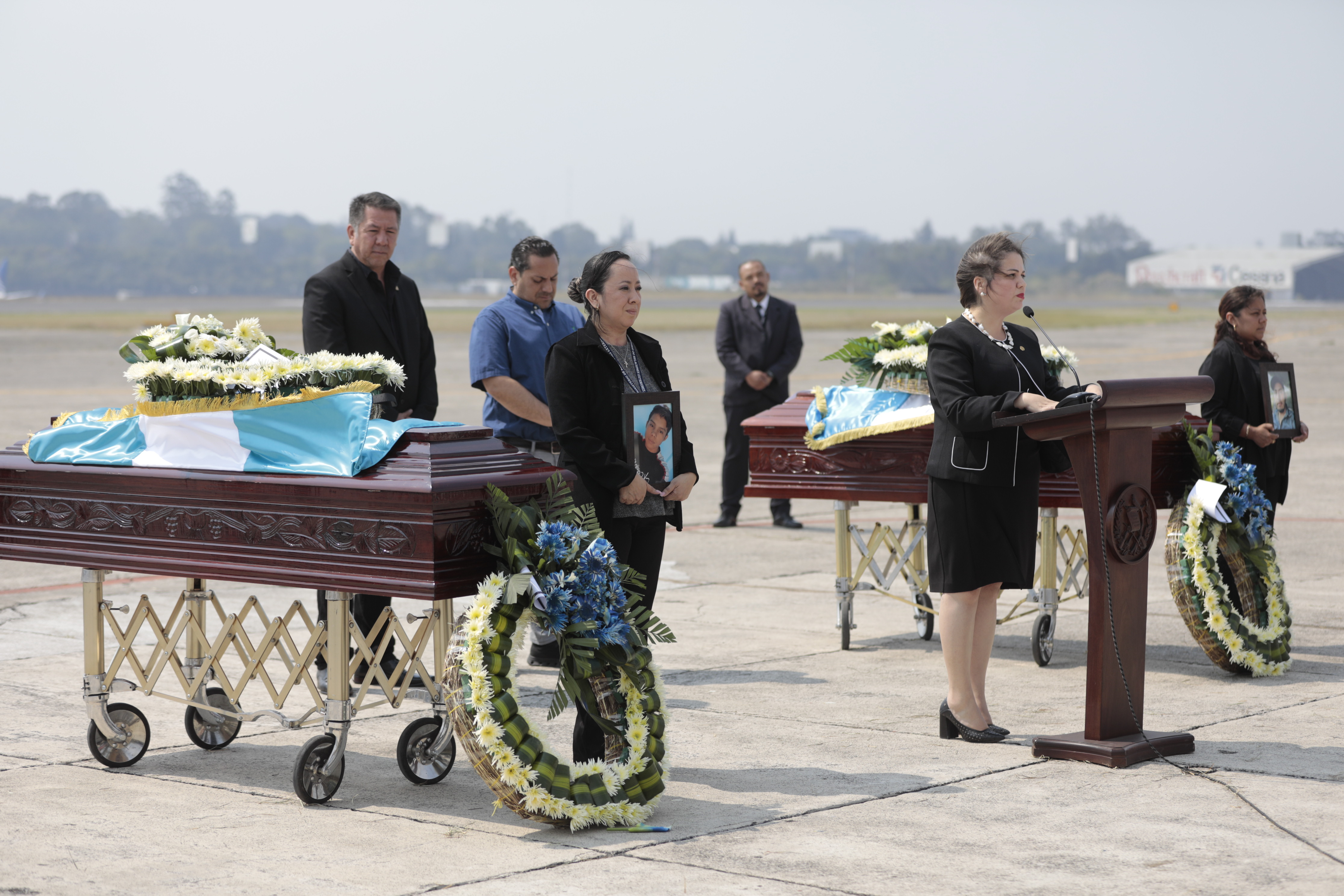
Repatriation of Guatemalan migrants

The fire left 40 people dead and 27 others seriously injured. The people killed and injured were all male detainees at the facility, from several South and Central American countries: one each from Colombia and Ecuador, 12 from El Salvador, 28 from Guatemala, 13 from Honduras, and 13 from Venezuela. The Guatemalan Migration Institute confirmed that 28 Guatemalan citizens were among the victims, and a later press release by the two countries' foreign ministries confirmed the deaths of 20. At a press conference the next day, however, Rosa Icela Rodríguez, the federal Secretary for Security and Civilian Protection, gave the breakdown of fatalities as 18 Guatemalans, seven Salvadorans, seven Venezuelans, six Hondurans and one Colombian. She added that the injured migrants who had been hospitalized were ten Guatemalans, eight Hondurans, five Salvadorans and five Venezuelans, one of whom had already been released.

== Aftermath ==
Federal attorney general Alejandro Gertz Manero launched an investigation in relation to the fire, and arrests were made on 28 March. Among those for whom arrest warrants were issued were three officials from the National Migration Institute, two private security guards employed at the facility, and the Venezuelan migrant suspected of starting the fire. The National Human Rights Commission (CNDH) was called on to help the migrants and it opened an ex officio investigation into the incident. The INM announced that the injured survivors would be granted humanitarian visitors' visas and that it would cover their medical expenses.

The incident is also being investigated for possible homicide charges, as the guards fled the center while people were still locked inside the cells.

In a press conference on 31 March, President López Obrador described the incident as perhaps the second-most painful episode of his presidency after the 2019 pipeline explosion in Tlahuelilpan, Hidalgo. Later that day, he visited Ciudad Juárez, where he was met by a contingent of protesting migrants. Also on 31 March, the Secretariat of Security and Civilian Protection announced the immediate and definitive closure of the migrant processing facility.

On 12 April, the attorney general's office announced that it had opened a criminal investigation into Francisco Garduño Yáñez, the head of the National Migration Institute, and one of his senior subalterns for their failure to protect and provide security to the persons and facilities under their authority. Following a court order, Garduño issued a public apology over the fire on 26 September 2025.

== Reactions ==
The United States Ambassador to Mexico, Ken Salazar, said on Twitter that the fire was a "reminder to the governments of the region of the importance of fixing a broken migration system". Felipe González Morales, a former president of the Inter-American Commission on Human Rights and serving at the time as United Nations Special Rapporteur on the human rights of migrants, criticized the practice of mass detentions of migrants, saying on Twitter, "extensive use of immigration detention leads to tragedies like this one". United Nations Secretary-General António Guterres expressed his condolences and called for a thorough investigation of the incident and the establishment of safer, more regulated, and organized migration pathways.

The President of Mexico, Andrés Manuel López Obrador, in his first statements, held responsible the migrants for the fire for protesting their possible deportation. He also accused the journalists at his conference of being interested in the fire due to yellow journalism.

== See also ==
- 2009 Ciudad Juárez prison riot
- Higüey Prison fire
- Illegal immigration to Mexico
