= Radovan Kovačević (politician) =

Bosnian Serb politician (born 1993)

- Радован Ковачевић
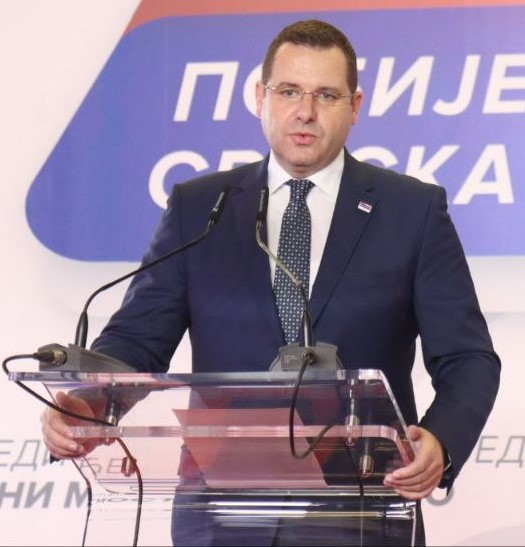
- Kovačević in 2024

delegate to the House of Peoples of the Parliamentary Assembly of Bosnia and Herzegovina
- Incumbent
- Assumed office 16 February 2023

Political Advisor to the President of Republika Srpska
- In office 15 November 2022 – 15 February 2023
- President: Milorad Dodik

Political advisor to the Serbian member of the Presidency of Bosnia and Herzegovina
- In office 20 November 2018 – 15 November 2022

Spokesman of the Alliance of Independent Social Democrats
- Incumbent
- Assumed office 13 February 2018

Personal details
- Born: 14 June 1983 (age 42) Travnik, SR Bosnia and Herzegovina, SFR Yugoslavia
- Party: Alliance of Independent Social Democrats

Radovan Kovačević (Serbian Cyrillic: Радован Ковачевић; born 14 June 1983 in Travnik) is a Serbian politician and political scientist from Republika Srpska. He is a Member of Parliament - delegate to the House of Peoples of the Parliamentary Assembly of Bosnia and Herzegovina and a spokesperson for the Alliance of Independent Social Democrats.

== Biography ==
Radovan Kovačević was born on 14 June 1983 in Travnik, where he lived until the outbreak of the war in Bosnia and Herzegovina in 1992. He then moved to Gradiška, where he completed elementary school, and high school in Banja Luka. Since 2008, he has lived and worked in Banja Luka. He holds a degree in political science. In his youth, he played guitar and bass guitar and was a member of several alternative rock and roll bands. He speaks English and German.

== Career ==
After graduating from high school and during his studies, he worked in various jobs, such as a waiter, parquet layer, metal worker, and welder. After graduating, he worked as a journalist for a while. He was, among other things, the deputy editor-in-chief of the portal Frontal, as well as a multimedia editor at Radio Televizija Republike Srpske. In addition, he worked in several marketing agencies in the field of public relations.

Since 2014, he has been politically active in the Alliance of Independent Social Democrats. Since 2016, he has been a close associate of SNSD President Milorad Dodik, whose political advisor he was in two terms, as the Serb member of the Presidency of Bosnia and Herzegovina and as President of Republika Srpska. On 23 February 2018, the SNSD Executive Committee appointed him as the party's spokesperson, a position he still holds today. He is a member of both the Presidency and the Main Board of the SNSD. After the 2022 General Elections, the deputies of the National Assembly of the Republika Srpska elected Radovan Kovačević as a delegate to the House of Peoples of the Parliamentary Assembly of Bosnia and Herzegovina at the session of 1 December. As a member of the Joint Committee for European Integration, he was part of the Bosnia and Herzegovina delegation that visited the European Parliament in March 2024, where they discussed BiH's European integration, accession and stabilization. He is also a member of the B&H delegation to the OSCE Parliamentary Assembly. In May, he attended a meeting with the OSCE Representative on Freedom of the Media, Jan Braathu, where they discussed media freedom in Bosnia and Herzegovina. Radovan Kovačević is one of the main candidates for the position of chief negotiator of Bosnia and Herzegovina with the European Union.
