= Victor Madrigal-Borloz =

Costa Rican lawyer

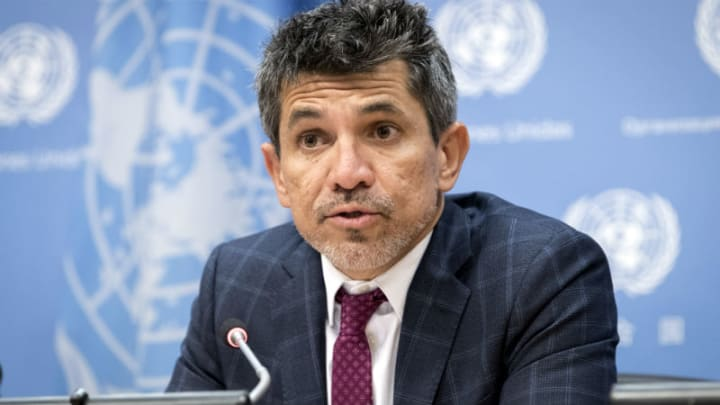

United Nations Independent Expert on Protection Against Violence and Discrimination Based on Sexual Orientation and Gender Identity
- In office 2018–2023
- Appointed by: United Nations Human Rights Council
- Preceded by: Vitit Muntarbhorn
- Succeeded by: Graeme Reid

Victor Madrigal-Borloz is a Costa Rican lawyer. Between 2018 and 2023, he served as the United Nations Independent Expert on protection against violence and discrimination based on sexual orientation and gender identity (UN IE SOGI). During his tenure at the U.N., Madrigal-Borloz has been noted for focusing his Human Rights Council mandate on investigating a broad and intersectional range of issues facing LGBT communities around the world, including conversion therapy, criminalization, socio-cultural exclusion, anti-trans rhetoric, and the outsized impact of the COVID-19 pandemic on vulnerable LGBT and gender-diverse populations.

== Career ==
Madrigal-Borloz started his career at the Inter-American Court of Human Rights in San José, Costa Rica. He then worked at the Danish Institute for Human Rights, and later returned to the OAS and served as Head of Litigation and Head of the Registry at the Inter-American Commission on Human Rights, where he was also the first staff member in a unit on the human rights of LGBTI persons.

Starting in 2013, Victor served a four-year term as a member of the United Nations (UN) Subcommittee on the Prevention of Torture, a body of independent experts established pursuant to the Optional Protocol of the Convention against Torture (OPCAT) to monitor, assist and advise States in the adoption of policies and practices to prevent torture. Madrigal-Borloz was named the Secretary-General of the International Rehabilitation Council for Torture Victims also in 2013, an international non-governmental organization of over 144 centers providing rehabilitation to torture victims in 74 countries around the world. He led the organization to affirm its vision of full enjoyment of the right to rehabilitation for all victims of torture and ill treatment.

In January 2018, he commenced as UN Independent Expert on Protection against violence and discrimination based on sexual orientation and gender identity. He has said that his focus would be "on banning so-called ‘conversion therapy’ and repealing discriminatory laws". Madrigal Borloz is a signatory of the Yogyakarta Principles plus 10. He is also a founding member of the Costa Rican Association of International Law and a board member of the International Justice Resource Centre.

In addition to his work as the Independent Expert, Madrigal-Borloz concurrently serves as the Eleanor Roosevelt Senior Visiting Researcher in Human Rights at Harvard Law School.

== Work as independent expert ==
Madrigal-Borloz assumed the role of U.N. Independent Expert on Protection against violence and discrimination based on sexual orientation and gender identity (commonly known as the IE SOGI) in January 2018, after the inaugural holder of the mandate, Professor Vitit Muntarbhorn, stepped down for personal health reasons.

As part of his Human Rights Council-mandated work, Madrigal-Borloz researches and publishes two thematic reports a year - one to the U.N. General Assembly in New York and another to the Human Rights Council in Geneva. Over the years, Madrigal-Borloz has published the following reports as part of his mandate’s research function:

Year:	UN Human Rights Council Report	UN General Assembly Report
2018	Violence and discrimination	Depathologisation and Legal Recognition of Gender Identity
2019	Data collection and management	Socio-cultural and economic exclusion
2020	Conversion Therapy	Impact of COVID-19 Pandemic on LGBT Persons

In July 2019, in an official U.N. report, he called upon governments to fight back against religious authorities, leaders or agents that infringed LGBT rights through violence and discrimination, including hate speech. He has also worked with other mandate holders to evidence how dynamics of exclusion affect LGBT people in different social indicators, such as health, education, and housing.

In 2020, his report to the UN Human Rights Council garnered widespread international attention after it called for a “global ban” on the practice of conversion therapy against LGBTQ individuals. During the COVID-19 pandemic, his office published the A.S.P.I.R.E. guidelines - an intersectional human rights framework designed to advise governments on how to best protect the rights of vulnerable LGBT communities when devising pandemic-related public policies and interventions.

In 2023, his report as the UN’s independent expert on sexual orientation in which he asserts that freedom of religion or personal beliefs are not incompatible with the equality of LGBTQ people and gender identity was viralized, and subsequently distorted online to spread anti-LGBTQ tropes. Similar false claims involving a purported encouragement of pedophilia by the ICJ were also spread online, which at no point calls for decriminalizing sex with minors, but to not enforce criminal sanctions due to romantic activity between adolescents of similar ages.

In addition to his reports, Madrigal-Borloz conducted investigatory country visits and responded to individual allegations of state-sponsored violence and discrimination against LGBT persons. Under Madrigal-Borloz’s tenure, the mandate has conducted country visits to Georgia, Mozambique, and Ukraine.

Madrigal-Borloz also traveled widely to meet with members of civil society to gather information for his thematic reports, and to assess the on-the-ground human rights situations of LGBT individuals and their advocates. The mandate frequently releases “calls for information” to local civil society actors as part of the mandate’s research and data collection process. In a nod to the intersectionality of the mandate’s nature, Madrigal-Borloz frequently partnered with other U.N. special procedures members - including the U.N. Special Rapporteurs on torture, freedom of opinion and expression, violence against women, older persons, and disability, amongst others - on joint statements and reports.
