= Rosa Kornfeld-Matte =

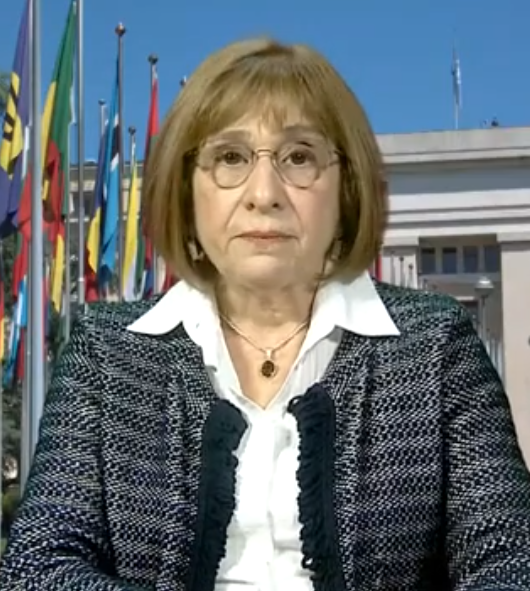
- In a UNOHCHR video in 2017

United Nations Independent Expert on the enjoyment of all human rights by older persons
- In office May 2014 – May 2020
- Succeeded by: Claudia Mahler

Personal details
- Occupation: Civil servant

Rosa Kornfeld-Matte is a Chilean civil servant. She was the first United Nations Independent Expert on the enjoyment of all human rights by older persons, from May 2014 until May 2020.

== Life ==
Kornfeld-Matte was the National Director of the Chilean National Service of Ageing (Servicio Nacional del Adulto Mayor SENEMA). She created the Pontifical Catholic University of Chile's programme for older people.

The proposal to create an Independent Expert on the enjoyment of all human rights by older persons was agreed by the Office of the United Nations High Commissioner for Human Rights in 2013. Kornfeld-Matte was chosen to be the first holder of this volunteer position in 2014. Her first report was published in 2015 and it focussed on autonomy and care.

In 2020 she achieved an ambition when she was invited to make an official visit to New Zealand. Kornfeld-Matte was expecting to be impressed by the way the country cared for their elder citizens. This was not the case. She was surprised to find that many found their pension too small to live on easily and in particular elderly Māori people struggled. Statistics showed that Māori people had a life expectancy that was six years shorter than their peers.

She completed her six-year term as a UN Expert in 2020. She was succeeded by Claudia Mahler from Austria. Chile launched a programme for the decade in 2020 to improve the lot of the elderly.
