= Tomás Ojea Quintana =

Argentine human rights lawyer

Tomás Ojea Quintana is an Argentine human rights lawyer who has served as United Nations Special Rapporteur on the situation of human rights in Myanmar and in North Korea.

== Career ==
Ojea Quintana worked for the Inter-American Commission of Human Rights and has represented the Argentinian non-governmental organization Abuelas de Plaza de Mayo in cases concerning child abduction during the military dictatorship of 1976–1983.

=== United Nations roles ===
Ojea Quintana served as head of the OHCHR programme on the protection and promotion of human rights in Bolivia.

He was United Nations Special Rapporteur on Human Rights in Myanmar from 2008 to 2014. He visited the country several times, travelling extensively, including in Rakhine State, where he verified and reported on crimes against humanity committed against the Rohingya people. Due to these activities, he faced public demonstrations in Myanmar and his car was attacked by a mob in Meikhtila.

He subsequently served as Special Rapporteur on the situation of human rights in North Korea until 2022, when he was replaced by Elizabeth Salmón.
