= Gabriella Battaini-Dragoni =

Italian author, educator and politician

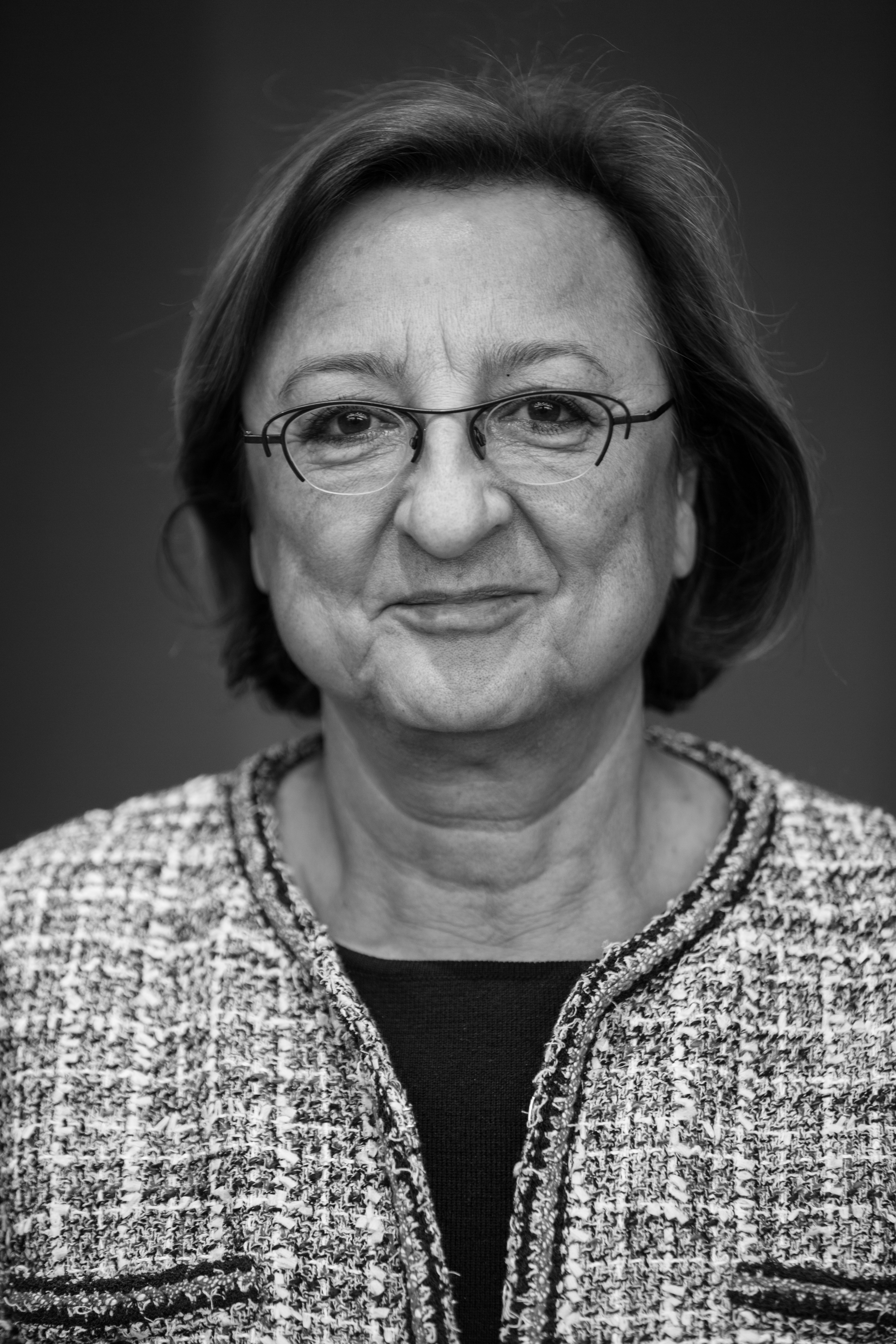

Deputy Secretary General of the Council of Europe
- Incumbent
- Assumed office 1 September 2012
- Preceded by: Maud de Boer-Buquicchio

Personal details
- Born: 13 August 1950 (age 76) Brescia, Italy
- Education: University of Venice; University of Nice

Gabriella Battaini-Dragoni (born 13 August 1950) is an Italian author, educator and politician, currently serving as the Deputy Secretary General of the Council of Europe (since 2012). She previously held the post of Director General of Programs and was the first female Director General in the history of the Council of Europe.

== Early life and education ==
Battaini-Dragoni was born in Brescia, Italy. She holds a degree in foreign languages and literature from the University of Venice and a diploma from the University of Nice. She was a departmental assistant in the department of Economic geography at the Ca' Foscari University of Venice.

== Career ==
From 1976 until 2012, Battaini-Dragoni held a number of roles at the Council of Europe, including Educational Advisor; Administrator; Head of Service; Director; Coordinator for Intercultural Dialogue; Director General of Education, Culture and Heritage, Youth and Sport; and Director General of Programs.

In addition to her work with the Council of Europe, Battaini-Dragoni has been published in a variety of publications, including The European Law Students' Association, Europa Nostra, and the European Journal of Migration and Law. She has written on subjects including intercultural dialogue, equity, migration, and human rights.

=== Deputy Secretary General (2012–2021) ===
In 2012, Battaini-Dragoni was elected to the position of Deputy Secretary General by the Parliamentary Assembly of the Council of Europe. She was re-elected to the post in 2015. As Deputy Secretary General, she oversees the implementation of policy reforms, shapes programming and budget, and oversees the Council of Europe's employment policies. She also serves as a member of the International Partnership Against Corruption in Sport for the Olympic Games and International Olympic Committee.

== Personal life ==
Battaini-Dragoni is married and has three children.

== Honors ==
- Order of the Rising Sun, 3rd Class, Gold Rays with Neck Ribbon (2020)
