= Claudia Mahler =

Austrian academic

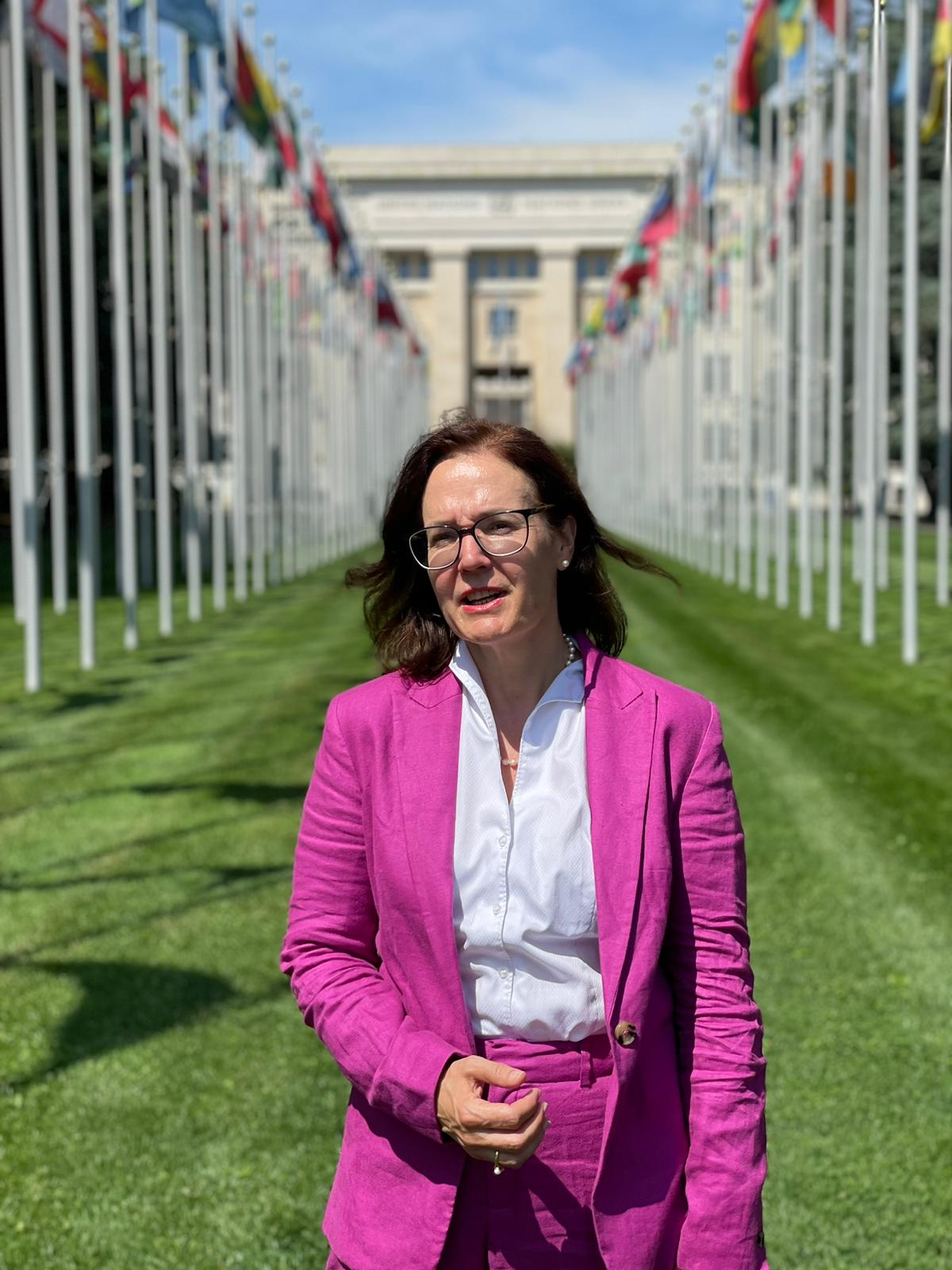
Claudia Mahler (2023)

Claudia Mahler (born 1969) is an Austrian academic who became the second UN Independent Expert on the human rights of older persons at the United Nations Human Rights Council. Dr. Mahler assumed her role as Independent Expert in May 2020. She is also a senior researcher in the field of economic, social and cultural rights for the German Institute for Human Rights (DIMR) since 2010. She was also a visiting professor at the Alice Salomon Hochschule in 2020–2021.

== Career ==
Mahler completed her doctoral degree in 2000. Same year, she was appointed Vice President of the Human Rights Commission for Tyrol and Vorarlberg and later became a consultant to OHCHR in Geneva and taught human rights law rising to the position of a visiting professor at the Alice Salomon University of Applied Sciences Berlin. From 2001 to 2009, Mahler conducted research at the Human Rights Centre of the University of Potsdam and was a senior researcher at the German Institute for Human Rights from 2010. She was appointed as an independent expert to the United Nations Human Rights Council in May 2020. She succeeded Rosa Kornfeld-Matte of Chile who was the first person to deliver this role from 2014. In 2024, Mahler is running for the election of the European Ombudsman.
