= Ofelia Calcetas-Santos =

Filipino lawyer (died 2011)

United Nations special rapporteur on the sale of children
- In office 1994–2001
- Preceded by: Vitit Muntarbhorn
- Succeeded by: Juan Miguel Petit

Ofelia Calcetas-Santos (died January 2011) was a Filipino public servant who was the United Nations Special Rapporteur on the sale of children, child prostitution and child pornography from 1994 to 2001. During her tenure as Special Rapporteur, Calcetas-Santos published reports on the sexual abuse of children in Mexico and the sale of children in Guatemala.

== Education ==
Calcetas-Santos graduated from the University of the Philippines College of Law.

== Career ==
Calcetas-Santos started her career with the United Nations in 1994 when she replaced Vitit Muntarbhorn as the Special Rapporteur on the sale of children, child prostitution and child pornography. She began her position conducting research on child prostitution across the world in 1996. Her report released in November 1996 focused on the connections between sexually transmitted diseases and child sexual abuse. In 1997, Calcetas-Santos conducted an inquiry into how tourist attractions of Mexico were effected by the pornography and prostitution of young children. In her 1998 report presented to the United Nations, Calcetas-Santos said the sexual abuse of young children in Mexico was mainly occurring in Tijuana.

The following year, Calcetas-Santos started research into the sale of children for adoption in Guatemala to North American and European countries. After her report was published in May 2000, Calcetas-Santos was criticized for not providing statistical information on her allegation that Guatemalan babies were being sold more often than adopted. In response, Calcetas-Santos said that she did not include any statistical information due to the limited time she had for research. When her tenure as Special Rapporteur ended in 2001, Calcetas-Santos was replaced by Juan Miguel Petit.

== Death ==
Calcetas-Santos died in January 2011.
