= Alice Cruz =

Portuguese anthropologist and lawyer

- Born: Ecuador
- Occupations: anthropologist and lecturer in law
- Known for: UN Special Rapporteur on the human rights of people with leprosy
- Successor: Beatriz Miranda Galarza

Alice Cruz is a Portuguese anthropologist who became a lawyer and the UN Special Rapporteur on the human rights of people with leprosy (Hansen's disease).

== Life ==
Cruz was born in Ecuador and she first established herself as a medical anthropologist. She was impressed by the people she met during her work in Brazil, Bolivia, Ecuador, and South Africa. These people, who had leprosy, bravely demanded dignity.

The Human Rights Council voted to establish the mandate of a Special Rapporteur for a period of three years. In November 2017 Cruz, who was then teaching law in Ecuador, was appointed as the UN Special Rapporteur on the elimination of discrimination against persons affected by leprosy and their family members. Cruz had spent her career with an interest in leprosy and in trying to reduce the stigma and derision that accompanied it. She noted that the World Health Organization were not only recording cases of leprosy, but they were also recording the accompanying discrimination.

In August 2018, Cruz issued a statement saying that, "The use of leprosy as a pejorative metaphor derives from long-lasting stigmatising connotations produced by different cultural traditions, social rules and legal frameworks,.. Using it as a metaphor leads to wrongful stereotyping that fuels public stigma, everyday discrimination, and impairs the enjoyment of human rights and fundamental freedoms by persons affected and their families."

In 2019 she recognised the progress that Brazil had made in reducing the number of cases in their country and in effect in the Americas. Prior to their action, Brazil was the location of 90% of all the cases of leprosy in the America's. Cruz highlighted the stigma that surrounded the disease and the real negative effects that this had on the progress of the disease. She requested that this stigma should be reduced and she cited Brazil again as this was part of their success.

Cruz's term as a special entrepreneur was for three years. In 2000 her appointment was renewed and she served until 2023 when she was succeeded in September by Beatriz Miranda-Galarza. Miranda-Galarza's amended job title was "Special Rapporteur on the elimination of discrimination against persons affected by leprosy (Hansen’s disease) and their family members". In October 2023 Crux (using the amended job title) presented her report to the UN General Assembly titled "Legal framework for the elimination of discrimination based on leprosy".
