= OSCE Representative on Freedom of the Media =

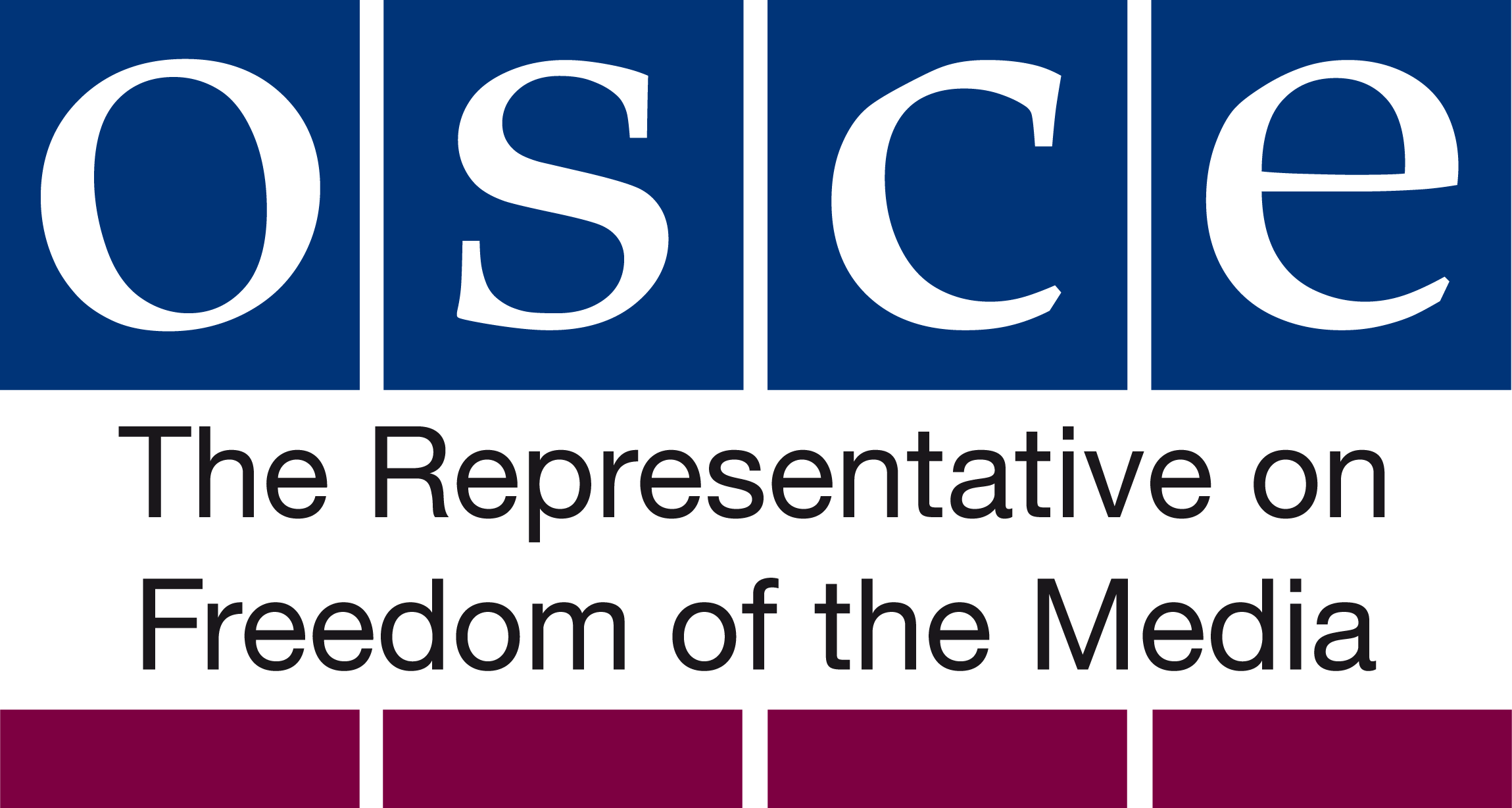
- Logo
- Headquarters: Vienna, Austria
- Type: Office within the Organization for Security and Co-operation in Europe

Leaders
  - Representative: Teresa Ribeiro

Establishment
  - Founded: 1998
- Website https://www.osce.org/representative-on-freedom-of-media

The OSCE Representative on Freedom of the Media functions as a watchdog on media developments in all 57 participating member states of the Organization for Security and Co-operation in Europe (OSCE). The representative provides early warning on violations of freedom of expression and promotes full compliance with OSCE principles and commitments regarding freedom of expression and press freedom.

== Mission ==
In cases where serious violations have occurred, the representative seeks direct contacts with the offending state and other parties involved, assesses the facts and assists in resolving problems. The representative collects and receives information on the situation of the media from a variety of sources, including participating OSCE States, non-governmental organizations and media organizations. The representative meets with member governments.

The office of the representative is based in Vienna, Austria, and has a staff of 15.

Each year, they issue a joint declaration calling attention to worldwide free expression concerns.

== List of Representatives ==
- Freimut Duve (Germany): 1998–2004
- Miklós Haraszti (Hungary): 2004–2010
- Dunja Mijatović (Bosnia and Herzegovina): 2010–2017
- Harlem Désir (France): 2017-2020
- Teresa Ribeiro (Portugal): 2020-2024
- Jan Braathu (Norway): since 2025

== Other bodies ==
The OSCE Representative is one of the four international mechanisms for promoting freedom of expression. The others are:

- UN Special Rapporteur on Freedom of Opinion and Expression
- OAS Special Rapporteur for Freedom of Expression
- African Commission on Human and Peoples' Rights Special Rapporteur for Freedom of Expression
