= Rhona Smith =

British legal academic

United Nations special rapporteur on the situation of human rights in Cambodia
- In office 2015–2021

Personal details
- Education: University of Strathclyde (PhD)
- Occupation: International human rights lawyer

Rhona K. M. Smith is a British legal academic. She is professor of international human rights and former head of Newcastle Law School at Newcastle University and was the United Nations special rapporteur on the situation of human rights in Cambodia.

== Career ==
Smith joined Newcastle University in August 2016 as Professor of International Human Rights. She was Head of School from 2016 through to 2020.

Smith served two three-year terms as UN special rapporteur for Cambodia, completing her service in March 2021, at which time she was succeeded in that office by Thai scholar Vitit Muntarbhorn. She was criticised by the Cambodian government for behaving like a "teacher in a classroom". Smith had questioned the 2018 elections where Cambodian People's Party had taken all 125 seats. She noted that 118 politicians had been arrested and the courts had dissolved an opposition party, ignoring the constitution which expected a multi-party state. In March 2021, Smith joined three other UN special rapporteurs in criticising lengthy jail terms given to Cambodian opposition leaders living in exile for seeking to return to Cambodia and foment popular opposition to the continued rule of Prime Minister Hun Sen.

== Selected publications ==
- Smith, Rhona K. M. (2018). International Human Rights Law (8th ed.). Oxford UP. ISBN 9780198805212.
- Smith, Rhona K. M. (2016). Textbook on International Human Rights (7th ed.). Oxford UP. ISBN 9780198746218.
- Smith, Rhona (31 July 2018). Core Documents on European and International Human Rights 2018-19. Macmillan Core Statutes (4th ed.). Red Globe Press. ISBN 9781352003260.
