= Vitit Muntarbhorn =

Thai professor and human rights expert

Vitit Muntarbhorn KBE
- วิทิต มันตาภรณ์
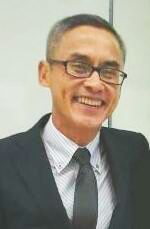
- Muntarbhorn in 2011

United Nations Special Rapporteur on the Sale and Sexual Exploitation of Children
- In office 1991–1994
- Preceded by: Position established
- Succeeded by: Ofelia Calcetas-Santos

United Nations Independent Expert on sexual orientation and gender identity
- In office August 2016 – October 2017
- Preceded by: Position established
- Succeeded by: Victor Madrigal-Borloz

United Nations special rapporteur on the situation of human rights in Cambodia
- In office March 2021 – November 2025
- Preceded by: Rhona Smith
- Succeeded by: Tom Andrews

Personal details
- Born: November 1952 (age 73)
- Education: Oxford; Free University of Brussels

Vitit Muntarbhorn (born 1952) (Thai: วิทิต มันตาภรณ์, RTGS: Withit Mantaphon) is an international human rights expert and professor of law at Chulalongkorn University in Bangkok, Thailand.

He has been involved in various UN activities and has served as an expert or consultant with the OHCHR, UNHCR, UNDP, FAO, UNICEF, UNESCO, the WHO and the United Nations University.

== Biography ==
Muntarbhorn, born in November 1952, was educated at Oxford and Free University of Brussels, and was called to the Bar in England before going on to lecture in law at various universities in Austria, Canada, Denmark, England, France, Switzerland and Thailand.

He served as the United Nations Special Rapporteur on the sale of children, child prostitution and child pornography from 1990 to 1994. In 1994, he coedited with C. Taylor a paper on human rights in Thailand. In 2004, he was awarded the UNESCO Prize for Human Rights Education. He was involved in the elaboration of the Yogyakarta Principles on LGBT rights.

In 2018, he was recipient of the Bonham Centre Award from the Mark S. Bonham Centre for Sexual Diversity Studies. He also was appointed an Honorary Knight Commander of the Order of the British Empire.

== Posts ==
=== North Korea ===
Muntarbhorn was nominated to the position of United Nations Special Rapporteur on the Situation of Human Rights in Democratic People's Republic of Korea (North Korea) from 2004 until 2010. Despite North Korea's repeatedly rejected his requests for meetings, he produced multiple reports regarding the situation of human rights in North Korea.

- Human Rights Council Session 4th Document Report of the Special Rapporteur on the situation of human rights in the Democratic People's Republic of Korea, Vitit Muntarbhorn A/HRC/4/15 7 February 2007.
- Human Rights Council Session 7th Document Report of the Special Rapporteur on the situation of human rights in the Democratic People's Republic of Korea, Vitit Muntarbhorn A/HRC/7/20 15 February 2008.

=== Ivory Coast ===
In 2011, Muntarbhorn was the Chair of the International Commission of Inquiry on the Ivory Coast, which also included Reine Alapini-Gansou and Suliman Ali Baldo.

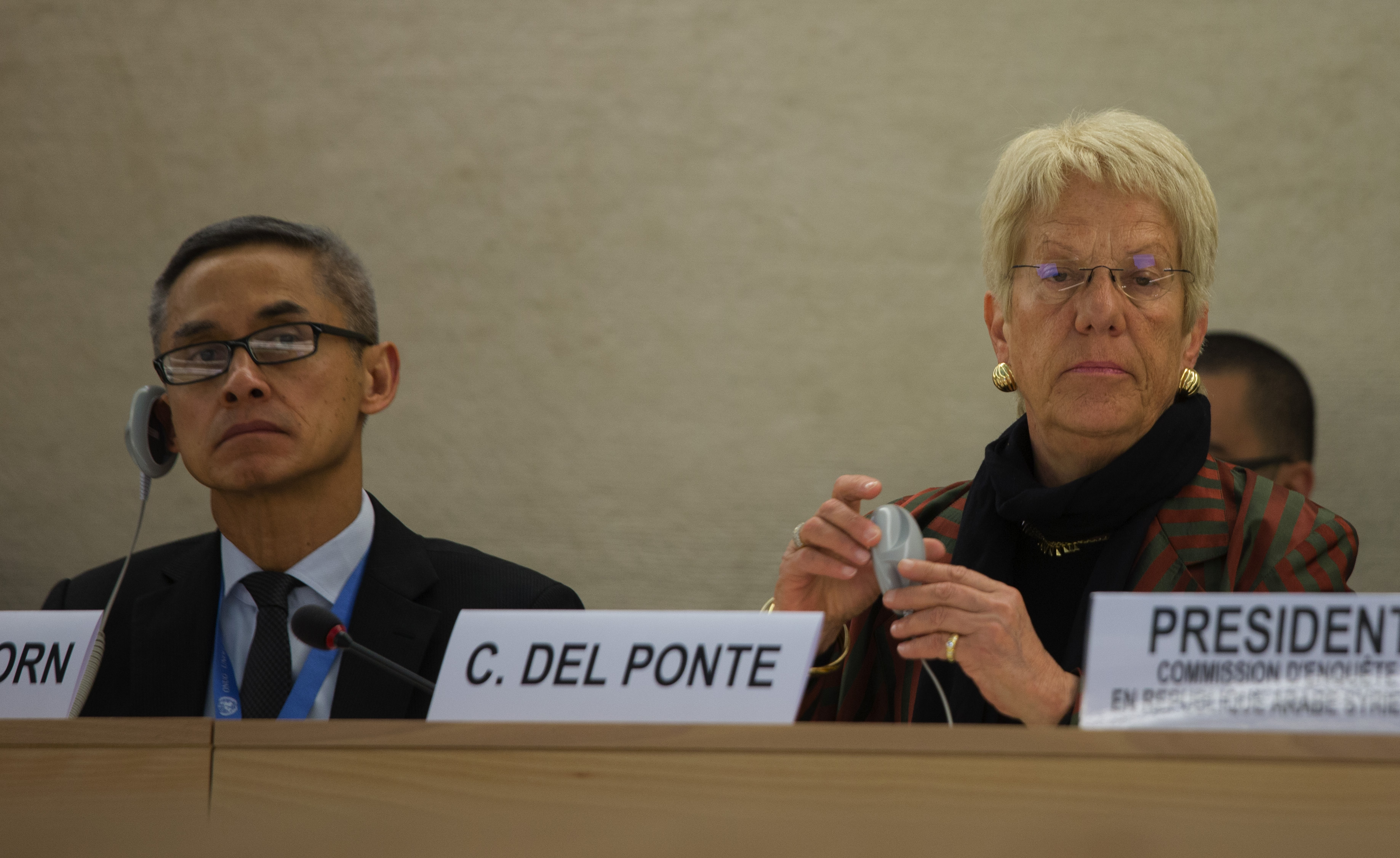
Commissioners Vitit Muntarbhorn and Carla Del Ponte present their report to the Human Rights Council in March 2014

=== Syria ===
From 2012 until 2016 Muntarbhorn was one of the Commissioners of the Independent International Commission of Inquiry on the Syrian Arab Republic. The Commission produced various reports investigating war crimes and crimes against humanity. In 2016, Muntarbhorn stepped down when the UNHRC designated him the first UN Independent Expert on violence and discrimination based on sexual orientation and gender identity.

=== Independent Expert on sexual orientation and gender identity ===
In his first report Muntarbhorn identified six key underpinnings for the mandate of the Independent Expert: (A/HRC/35/36)

1. the decriminalization of consensual same-sex relations and of gender identity and expression;
2. effective anti-discrimination measures
3. the legal recognition of gender identity
4. destigmatization linked with depathologization
5. sociocultural inclusion; and
6. education with empathy.

His second report (A/72/172), addressed the first two issues. Muntarbhorn resigned on 31 October 2017 for private reasons. His successor, Victor Madrigal-Borloz, covered the remaining topics in his 2018 and 2019 reports.

=== Cambodia ===
Professor Vitit Muntarbhorn was appointed as the Special Rapporteur on the situation of human rights in Cambodia in March 2021. In an August 2022 Vitit has sumitted a report to the United Nations Human Rights Council (A/HRC/51/66). The report acknowledged Cambodia's high voter turnout in the June 2022 on commune elections, but warned that democratic pluralism had severely regressed into a ruling-party monopoly following the 2017 judicial dissolution of the main opposition Cambodia National Rescue Party (CNRP). Highlighting a shrinking civic space, he also detailed key human rights concerns, including draconian emergency and online surveillance laws, ongoing mass trials of opposition members, arbitrary detentions of journalists and activists, prison overcrowding, microfinance-driven land loss, and human trafficking linked to online scam operations. To guide national reform, Vitit formulated 20 actionable benchmarks urging the Cambodian government to release political detainees, restore opposition political rights, guarantee judicial independence, safeguard natural resources and vulnerable groups, and establish an independent national human rights institution.
