= Anaïs Marin =

French political scientist (born 1977)

- Born: 1977 (age 47–48)
- Education: Sciences Po
- Known for: United Nations special rapporteur on the situation of human rights in Belarus
- Predecessor: Miklós Haraszti

Anais Marin (born 1977) is a French political scientist. In 2022, she became the United Nations special rapporteur on the situation of human rights in Belarus.

== Life ==
Marin was born in 1977. Marin completed a degree in political science at Science Po Paris and completed her doctorate at the Centre de recherches internationales (CERI) there with a dissertation on the influence of paradiplomacy in Saint Petersburg on the foreign policy of the Russian Federation in the 1990s under the supervision of Anne de Tinguy.

She took up a postdoctoral position at the Helsinki Collegium for Advanced Studies, where she studied the European Union's eastern external borders. In 2011, she became a Belarus officer for the Finnish think tank Finnish Institute of International Affairs (FIIA). In this role, she has been a member of several expert networks informing and advising European decision-makers regarding Belarus. From 2015 to 2018, she was a Marie Curie Researcher at the Collegium Civitas university in Warsaw, associated with the European Union Institute for Security Studies in Paris. Her academic work and publications focus on the diplomacy of authoritarian regimes in post-Soviet Eurasia.

Marin taught Slavic studies and political science at the University of Clermont-Ferrand, Russian legal translation at the Lomonosov Centre in Geneva and international relations at the University of Helsinki. She participated in the OSCE election observation missions in the former USSR. She was a researcher at the University of Warsaw. She began working on a research project on dealing with threats from Russia, weaknesses of the European democratic project and possible ways of dealing with destabilising activities by Russia in 2019.

Since 1 November 2018, Marin has been the United Nations special rapporteur on the situation of human rights in Belarus for the United Nations Human Rights Council, succeeding the Hungarian academic Miklós Haraszti.

When the 2020 presidential election in Belarus led to nationwide protests over massive manipulation by the Lukashenka government, which the regime violently suppressed, the Office of the United Nations High Commissioner for Human Rights reported in September 2020 that there had been reports of over 450 documented cases of torture and ill-treatment since the day of the presidential election. In a statement signed by Anaïs Marin and a number of UN representatives, it said that the authorities in Belarus must immediately end all human rights violations. No one should be prosecuted for peacefully participating in demonstrations. In September 2021, Marin described the situation in Belarus as catastrophic. On September 6, two prominent Belarusian opposition figures, Maryja Kalesnikava and Maxim Znak, were sentenced to 11 and 10 years in prison for "conspiracy" in a trial described by the United States as "shameful".

In June 2024, she published her "Report of the Special Rapporteur on the situation of human rights in Belarus". She reported a deterioration which she attributed to the likelihood of a new election.

== Publications include ==
- Moscou et le monde. L'ambition de la grandeur: une illusion ? Autrement, 2008 (with Isabelle Facon and Vladimir Baranovsky)
- La dissuasion par la coopération. La Finlande, modèle de résilience face aux défis du « sharp power » russe. Stratégique 2019/1-2 (N° 121-122)
- Le Bélarus dans L'Union Eurasiatique. Partenaire Particulier Cherche à Préserver Ses Intérêts. Revue d'études comparatives Est-Ouest 2017/3-4 (N° 48)
- Les relations militaires de la Russie avec le Bélarus : une alliance qui laisse Moscou sur sa faim. Revue Défense nationale 2017/7 (N° 802)
- Argument Baltique: faux prétexte et modèle juste. Outre-Terre 2009/3 (n° 23)
- Belarus: Time for a 'principled' Re-engagement, 2022
