= United Nations Independent Expert on sexual orientation and gender identity =

United Nations Independent Expert

- Emblem of the United Nations
- Incumbent; Graeme Reid since November 2023
- Abbreviation: IE SOGI
- Inaugural holder: Vitit Muntarbhorn
- Formation: 30 June 2016
- Website: www.ohchr.org/en/special-procedures/ie-sexual-orientation-and-gender-identity

The United Nations Independent Expert on protection against violence and discrimination based on sexual orientation and gender identity (shortened to (U.N.) Independent Expert on sexual orientation and gender identity and abbreviated as IE SOGI) is a United Nations Independent Expert appointed by the body's Human Rights Council under its special procedures mechanism. The Independent Expert's Mandate is to examine, monitor, advise, and publicly report on matters related to human rights violations based on sexual orientation and gender identity.

The Mandate was established by Human Rights Council resolution 32/2 (30 June 2016), by a vote of 23 to 18, with 6 abstentions. In June 2019, during the 41st session of the Human Rights Council in Geneva, the Mandate was renewed for a three-year period in a resolution adopted by a vote of 27 to 12, with 7 abstentions. In July 2022, the Human Rights Council adopted a resolution to extend the term of the IE SOGI for another three years by a vote of 23 to 17, with 7 abstentions.

The current Mandate holder is Graeme Reid, who has occupied the position since November 2023. His predecessors were Vitit Muntarbhorn, who held the Mandate from August 2016 to October 2017, and Victor Madrigal-Borloz who held the Mandate from November 2017 to October 2023.

== See also ==
- LGBTQI+ rights at the United Nations
