= Beatriz Miranda Galarza =

Ecuadorian researcher (born 1971)

Beatriz Miranda-Galarza
- Born: Hilda Beatriz Miranda-Galarza; 1971 (age 54–55); Ecuador
- Education: Ecuador, Belgium and the UK
- Known for: Special Rapporteur on the elimination of discrimination against persons affected by leprosy (Hansen’s disease)
- Predecessor: Alice Cruz

(Hilda) Beatriz Miranda-Galarza (born 1971) is an Ecuadorian researcher and the Special Rapporteur on the elimination of discrimination against persons affected by leprosy (Hansen's disease) from 2023.

== Life ==
Miranda-Galarza was born in Ecuador and brought up in a family of eight children. Several of her siblings have intellectual disabilities due to Fragile X syndrome. She graduated in sociology at the Central University of Ecuador and she completed a master's degree in Latin American Studies also in Ecuador. She already had an interest in the health of minorities when she left her family in Ecuador to study anthropology in Belgium. She can speak several languages including Spanish, Italian, Portuguese and in English she completed her doctorate degree in the British city of Leeds. Her thesis was in disability studies and it was titled Family and disability in Ecuador: a critical social and cultural analysis of the concept of intellectual disability. The research looked at families from different racial groups where some members were labelled as "disabled".

She did research in Indonesia in leading research into the stigmatisation associated with leprosy.

In 2017 the Human Rights Council established a new UN Special Rapporteur to look at the elimination of discrimination against persons affected by leprosy. Alice Cruz was appointed and served until 2023 when she was succeeded by Miranda-Galarza whose amended job title was "Special Rapporteur on the elimination of discrimination against persons affected by leprosy (Hansen’s disease) and their family members".

Miranda-Galarza has lived in Mexico since 2018 where she works in critical disability studies at the Institute of Critical Studies in Mexico City. She believes that human rights principles can prevent people from seeing those affected by leprosy as just targets for care. She is working at a time when the World Health Organisation is targeting the elimination of leprosy.

In 2024 she was one of many UN Special Rapporteurs who signed an open letter to the "International community" on the third anniversary of the Taliban taking change in Afghanistan. They were concerned that the regime's human-rights abuses particularly against women and girls may become accepted. They encouraged the International Criminal Court to take urgent action against those responsible.

2024 also saw the beginnings of supply issues with the treatment for leprosy. Nigerians, (a thousand new people with leprosy every year) were unable to obtain the multi-drug treatment because of a change in the supply chain which triggered a need for new testing and many suffered. This was an international problem and it took a year to return supplies.

== Publications include ==
The power of personal knowledge: reflecting on conscientization in lives of disabled people and people affected by leprosy in Cirebon, Indonesia, 2013 (with others)

Traveling through Remembrance as Praxis with Disability Baggage, 2014

Rethinking Disability: World Perspectives in Culture and Society, 2016 (co-author)

In a chapter of the 2016 handbook, Disability in the Global South: The Critical Handbook, she and Siobhan Senier argue that even after de-colonisation, imperial ideas and constructs remain which effects people with disabilities.

Her 2018 publication whose title translates as Our history is not a lie covers research into the lives and discrimination of people with leprosy.
