= United Nations Special Rapporteur on the Sale and Sexual Exploitation of Children =

United Nations Special Rapporteur

- Emblem of the United Nations
- Incumbent; Mr. Vitit Muntarbhorn since May 2020
- Inaugural holder: Mr. Angelo d'Almeida Ribeiro
- Website: www.ohchr.org/en/issues/children/pages/childrenindex.aspx

The Special Rapporteur on the Sale and Sexual Exploitation of Children works on behalf of the United Nations Human Rights Council to investigate the exploitation of children around the world and make recommendations to governments on how to end such practices.

The position was created in 1990 by the former United Nations Commission on Human Rights (UNCHR) amidst growing international concern over the commercial sexual exploitation and the sale of children. It followed the adoption on 20 November 1989 of the Convention on the Rights of the Child by the United Nations General Assembly. This international instrument recognizes "that in all countries in the world, there are children living in exceptionally difficult conditions, and that such children need special consideration". By 2000, almost every country in the world had signed up to, and agreed to be bound by, the provisions of the convention.

The special rapporteur is required to investigate the exploitation of children around the world and to submit reports on the findings to the General Assembly and the UNCHR, making recommendations for the protection of the rights of the children concerned. These recommendations are targeted primarily at governments, other United Nations bodies and non-governmental organizations.

The current special rapporteur is Mama Fatima Singhateh.

Previous Special Rapporteurs were:

- Maud de Boer-Buquicchio (2014–2020)
- Najat Maalla M’jid (2008–2014)
- Juan Miguel Petit (2001–2008)
- Ofelia Calcetas-Santos (1994–2001)
- Vitit Muntarbhorn (1991–1994)

== See also ==
- Optional Protocol on the Sale of Children, Child Prostitution and Child Pornography
- United Nations special rapporteur
- Trafficking of children
