= Elizabeth Salmón =

Peruvian legal scholar and rapporteur

UN Special Rapporteur on human rights in North Korea
- Incumbent
- Assumed office August 2022
- Preceded by: Tomás Ojea Quintana

Personal details
- Born: Elizabeth Silvia Salmón Gárate Lima, Peru
- Education: University of Seville; PUCP

Elizabeth Silvia Salmón Gárate (born in Lima) is a Peruvian legal scholar and the current UN Special Rapporteur on the situation of human rights in the Democratic People's Republic of Korea. She was appointed in August 2022 by the OHCHR, replacing Tomás Ojea Quintana.

== Background ==
Salmón was born in Lima, Peru. She received her law degree in 1990 from the Pontifical Catholic University of Peru (PUCP). Shortly after, she attended the University of Seville in Spain, from which she obtained a doctorate in international law in 1996. She is a tenured professor of International Law at PUCP.

She was involved with Peru's Truth and Reconciliation Commission which looked at crimes and their victims of the 1980s and ‘90s. She went on to work in Colombia in the 2010s to establish peace between a revolutionary group and the government.

In 2024 she was one of many UN Special Rapporteurs who signed an open letter to the "International community" on the third anniversary of the Taliban taking change in Afghanistan. They were concerned that the regime's human-rights abuses particularly against women and girls may become accepted. They encouraged the International Criminal Court to take urgent action against those responsible.
