= Higüey Prison fire =

2005 fire in the Dominican Republic

Coordinates: 18.61400°N 68.71429°W

The Higüey Prison fire occurred on March 7, 2005, at Higüey Prison in Higüey, Dominican Republic.

The prison was claimed to be overcrowded at the time of the fire, housing 400 inmates but designed to house only 180. In all, 136 prisoners died. Among those killed was Edwin Adams Cotto.

The fire's cause was variously attributed to an inmate riot, guards firing tear gas, or a prisoner setting fire to a mattress.
