= Gehad Madi =

United Nations Special Rapporteur on the Human Rights of Migrants
- Incumbent
- Assumed office 1 November 2023

Personal details
- Born: 13 November 1951 (age 74) Egypt

Gehad Madi is the United Nations Special Rapporteur on the Human Rights of Migrants.

== Early life ==
Gehad Refaat Madi was born on 13 November 1951 in Egypt. Madi attended Ain Shams University in Cairo, graduating with a BA in German Language and Literature in 1975 and an LLB in Law in 1986.

== Career ==
He was the Egyptian Ambassador to India from 1998 to 2002 and the Ambassador to the United Kingdom from 2004 to 2008.

=== United Nations ===
==== Special Rapporteur on the Human Rights of Migrants ====
Gehad Madi was appointed Special Rapporteur on the Human Rights of Migrants starting on 1 November 2023.

Madi opposed the prosecution of the El Hiblu 3 in Malta, describing the charges as "unjustified".
