= Najat Maalla M'jid =

Moroccan pediatrician and politician

Najat Maalla M’jid
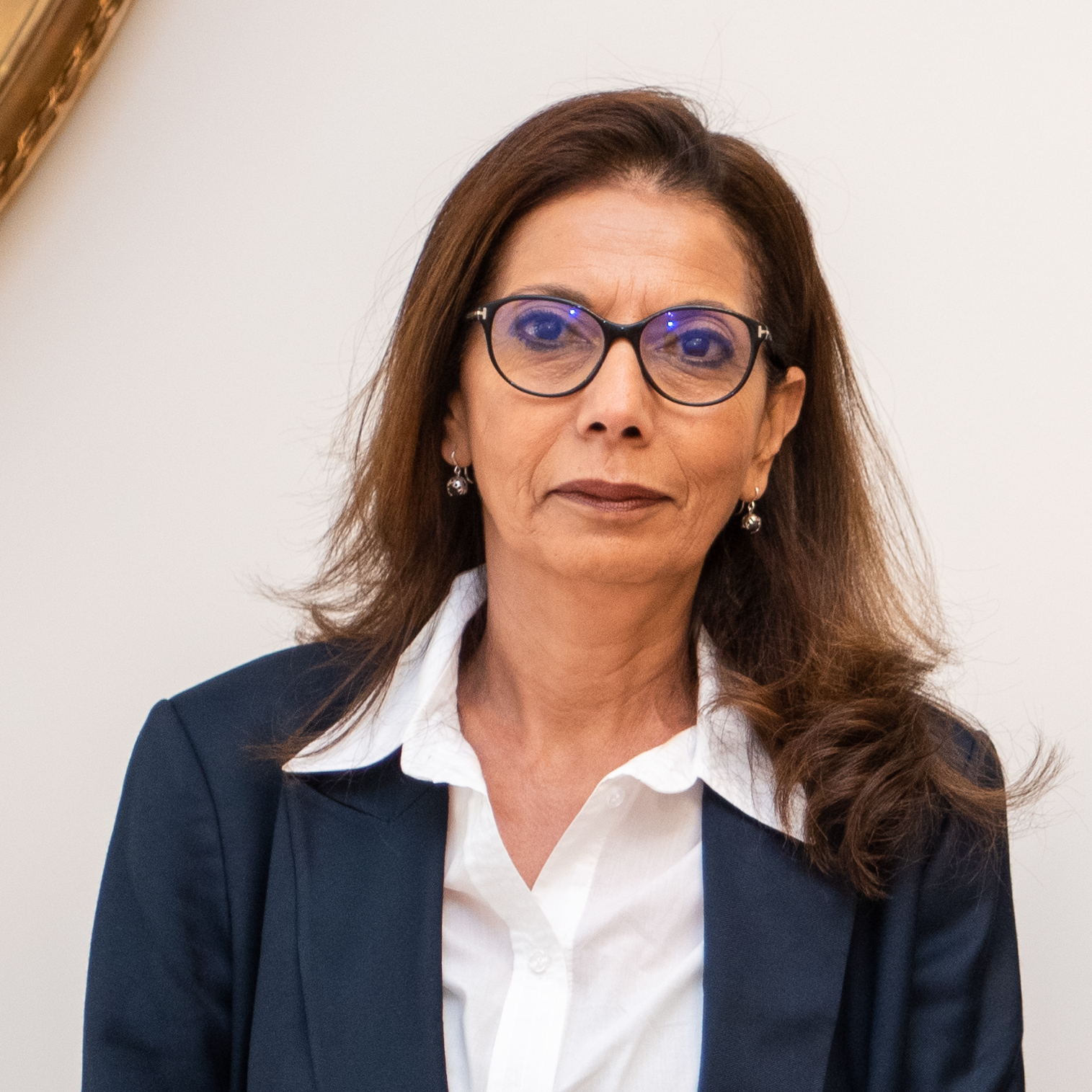
- M'jid in 2023
- Education: University of Bordeaux, University of Rabat et al
- Occupation: pediatrician
- Known for: Special Rapporteur on the sale, sexual exploitation and sexual abuse of children (2008-2014); Special Representative of the Secretary-General on Violence against Children (2019 -)
- Predecessor: Juan Miguel Petit
- Successor: Maud De Boer-Buquichchio

Najat Maalla M'jid (Arabic: نجاة مجيد) is a Moroccan paediatrician who serves as the United Nations Special Representative of the Secretary-General on Violence against Children. She was appointed to the role by Secretary-General of the United Nations António Guterres in May 2019. M'jid previously served as the Special Rapporteur on the sale of children, child prostitution and child pornography from 2008 to 2014.

== Early life and education ==
M'jid studied medicine at the University of Bordeaux and received a doctorate in general medicine from the University of Rabat. She also received a master's in human rights from the Human Rights Institute in Switzerland.

== Career ==
After university, M'jid worked as a doctor and became the Head of the Pediatric Department and Director of the Hay Hassani Mother-Child hospital in Casablanca. She founded the Non-governmental organization Bayti, which works with homeless youth in Morocco.

M'jid has served as a member of the Moroccan National Council on Human Rights and the Board of the African Child Policy Forum. In 2017 and 2018, she chaired a global task force to end the sexual exploitation of children in travel and tourism set up by ECPAT International.
