= Felipe González Morales =

Chilean lawyer and academic

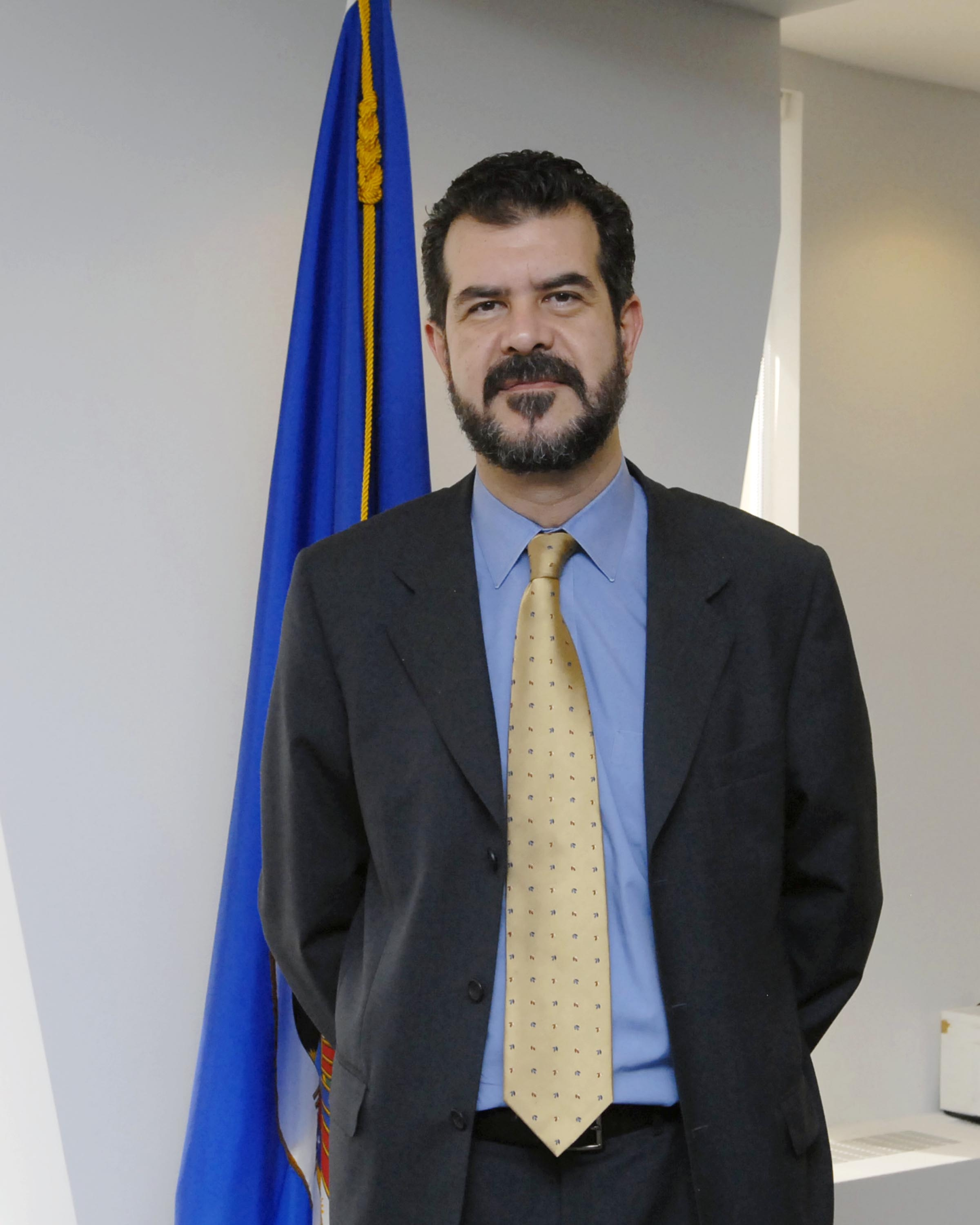
Felipe González in 2008

Felipe González Morales is a Chilean lawyer and academic, specializing in international human rights law. He was a commissioner of the Inter-American Commission on Human Rights (IACHR) between 2008 and 2011, a body he chaired between 2010 and 2011 and where he served as rapporteur on migrants. In 2017, he was appointed as United Nations Special Rapporteur on the human rights of migrants, a position he held until 2023.

== Education ==
González Morales holds a bachelor's degree in legal and social science from the University of Chile, master's degrees in international law from American University in the United States and in advanced human rights studies from Carlos III University in Spain, and a doctorate in law, also from Carlos III University.

== Career ==
He is a professor of international law at Diego Portales University in Santiago, Chile, where he also directs a masters' course in international human rights law. He is also a member of the law faculty at American University in Washington, D.C., United States.

In 2007 he was elected a member of the Inter-American Commission on Human Rights (IACHR), the human rights arm of the Organization of American States, by the OAS General Assembly, and he was elected to a second four-year term in 2011. During his time as a commissioner from 2008 to 2015 he served as the IACHR's rapporteur for migrants and, from March 2010 to March 2011, as the commission's president.

In June 2017, Felipe González Morales was appointed by the United Nations Human Rights Council to serve as the UN's Special Rapporteur on the human rights of migrants. His appointment was renewed for a further three-year term in June 2020. During his time in office, he has conducted country visits to Poland and Belarus, Bosnia and Herzegovina, Hungary, Niger and Nepal.
