= Sheila Keetharuth =

Mauritius human rights defender

Sheila B. Keetharuth is a Mauritius broadcaster and human rights activist who served as United Nations Special Rapporteur on the situation of human rights in Eritrea. She is the Vice-President AAIL (East Africa), She was awarded the Madrid Bar Association Medal of Honor for her human rights work in Africa.

== Education ==
Keetharuth graduated from University of Buckingham, UK with a law degree and a master’s degree in International Human Rights Law and Civil Liberties from University of Leicester, UK and was called to the Mauritius Bar in January 1997. She studied International Relations and Law at the University of Oxford between 1989 and 1990.

== Career ==
Keetharuth had a career in broadcasting and worked with the Programme Exchange Centre of the Union of Radio and Television Organisations of Africa (URTNA-PEC), Nairobi, Kenya, and with the Mauritius Broadcasting Corporation (MBC). She was Vice-President AAIL (East Africa) and was the Executive Director of the Institute for Human Rights and Development in Africa (IHRDA), a Pan-African Non-governmental organization based in Banjul, The Gambia. In 2002, she joined Amnesty International as a Researcher in its Africa Regional Office in Kampala, Uganda and served as the Interim Head of Office until December 2005.
