= Graeme Reid (activist) =

South African scholar and activist

- Born: Johannesburg
- Citizenship: South Africa
- Education: University of Witwatersrand; University of Amsterdam
- Occupations: Scholar; Activist; Researcher
- Employer: United Nations Independent Expert on sexual orientation and gender identity
- Organization: GALA Queer Archive

Graeme Reid (born 1965) is a South African scholar and activist who is the current United Nations Independent Expert on protection against violence and discrimination based on sexual orientation and gender identity (UN IE SOGI). Prior to being appointed UN IE SOGI, he was the director of the LGBT rights program at Human Rights Watch. He has also written two books: Real Gay: Gay Identities in small-town South Africa and Above the Skyline. Some of his written works have been published in scholarly journals and as chapters of a book.

== Early life and education ==
Reid was born in Johannesburg and attended University of Witwatersrand where he received his bachelor's degree in literature and master's degree in anthropology, and later earned a PhD from the University of Amsterdam for Social Science Research.

He became involved in South Africa's gay and lesbian movement during the apartheid and democratic-transition periods, participating in the Gay and Lesbian Organisation of the Witwatersrand. In 1995, he served as the Johannesburg office coordinator of the National Coalition for Gay and Lesbian Equality. He was the founder and director of the Gay and Lesbian Archives in South Africa and then worked as a researcher with the Institute for Social and Economic Research at his alma mater. Reid described himself as “authentically and verifiably gay” during his tenure at Human Rights Watch.

== Career ==
Reid co-directed the documentary film, Dark and Lovely, Soft and Free for the Gay and Lesbian Archives in 2000.
