= François Crépeau =

Canadian lawyer and professor

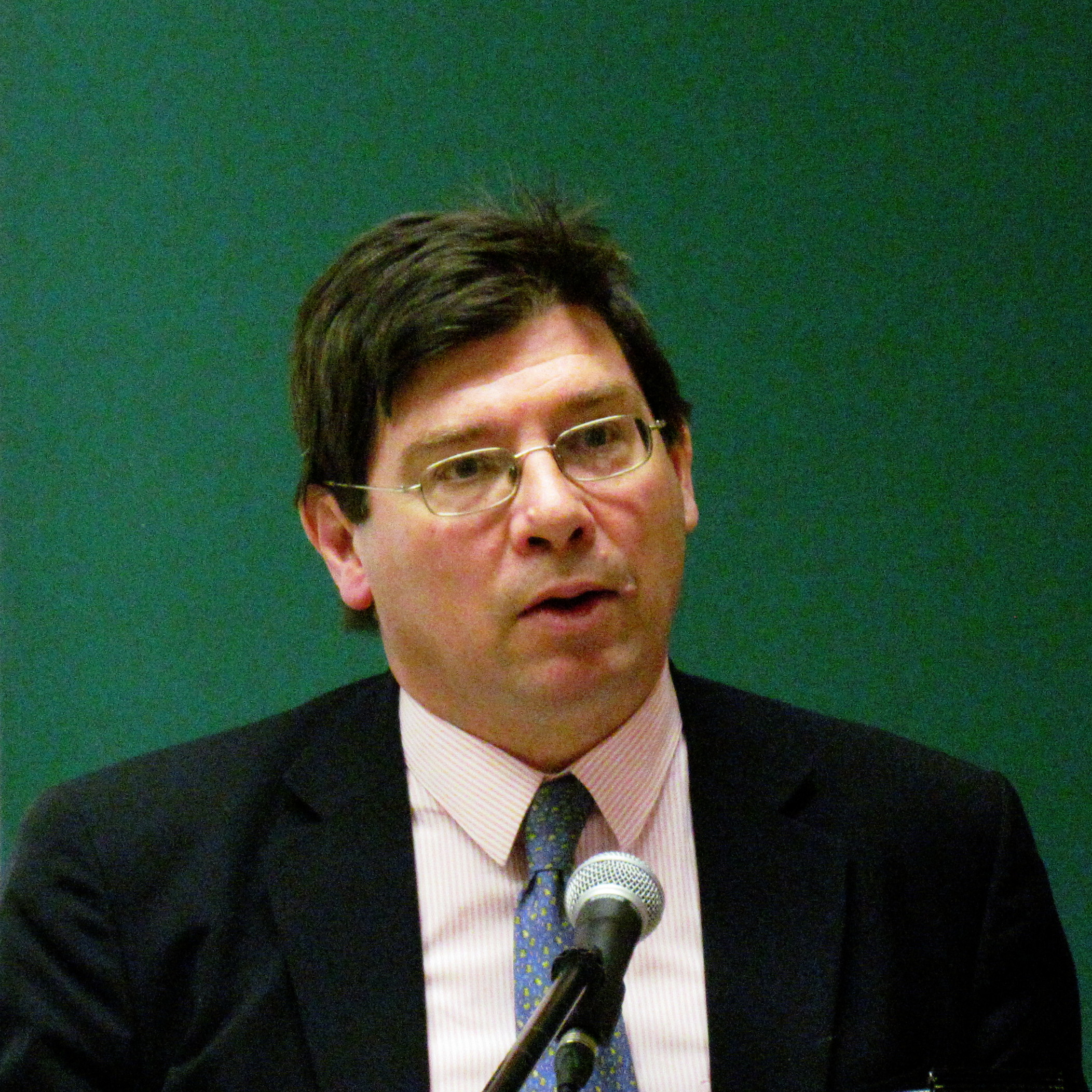
François Crépeau (February 2015).

François Crépeau, OC FRSC (born April 14, 1960) is a Canadian lawyer and Full Professor at the Faculty of Law at McGill University, as well as a former director of the McGill Centre for Human Rights and Legal Pluralism.

Professor Crépeau was the 2017–2018 International Francqui Professor Chair in Social Sciences at Université catholique de Louvain, in collaboration with six other Belgian universities. He was the 2016–2017 Robert F. Drinan, S.J. Visiting professor of Human Rights Chair at Georgetown University (Washington, DC). He has been guest professor at the following institutions: Centre de recherches sur les droits de l’homme, Université de Paris Panthéon-Assas (2018), Institut international des droits de l’homme (Strasbourg) (2001, 2002, 2007, 2008, 2015); Graduate Institute for International Studies (IUHEI-Genève, 2007), Institut des hautes études internationales, Université de Paris II (2002), Université d’Auvergne-Clermont 1 (1997).

In 2017, he was appointed Officer of the Order of Canada for his research on migrant and refugee rights in international law.

== Education ==
Born in Montreal, Quebec, Crépeau received a Bachelor of Laws (LLB) and a Bachelor of Civil Law (BCL) from McGill University and a Master's in Private Law from Bordeaux University. He later studied at Panthéon-Assas University where he earned his DEA in Legal Sociology and then went on to complete his PhD in law from Pantheon-Sorbonne University.

== Academic career ==
Since 2008, Crépeau has held the Hans & Tamar Oppenheimer Chair in Public International Law, at the Faculty of Law of McGill University. He also directed the McGill Centre for Human Rights and Legal Pluralism from 2015 to 2020.

Before his tenure at McGill University, Crépeau was a professor at the Université de Montréal from 2001 to 2008, where he held of the Canada Research Chair in International Migration Law, and was the founding scientific director of the Centre d’études et de recherches internationales de l’Université de Montréal (CÉRIUM). From 1990 to 2001, he was a professor at the Université du Québec à Montréal.

He is also a fellow of the Royal Society of Canada, and he was a Fellow of the Pierre Elliott Trudeau Foundation from 2008 to 2011.

== United Nations ==
From 2011 to 2017, he was named the United Nations Special Rapporteur on the Human Rights of Migrants. In this capacity, he has conducted official visits to Albania, Tunisia, Turkey, Italy, Greece, Qatar, Sri Lanka, Malta, the European institutions in Brussels and Vienna, Angola, Australia and Nauru.

He has also produced several thematic reports: the detention of migrants, the protection of migrants’ rights at the external borders of the European Union, climate change and migration, global migration governance, labour exploitation of migrants, labour recruitment practices, trade agreements and migration. From 2014 to 2015, he served as the Chair of the Coordination Committee of the United Nations Human Rights Procedures.

== Bibliography ==
- "François Crépeau, Special Rapporteur on the human rights of migrants". Office of the High Commissioner for Human Rights. a.
