= Guatemalan Immigration Institute =

The Guatemalan Migration Institute (Spanish: Instituto Guatemalteco de Migración) is a government agency that has exclusive competence for the implementation of migration policy.

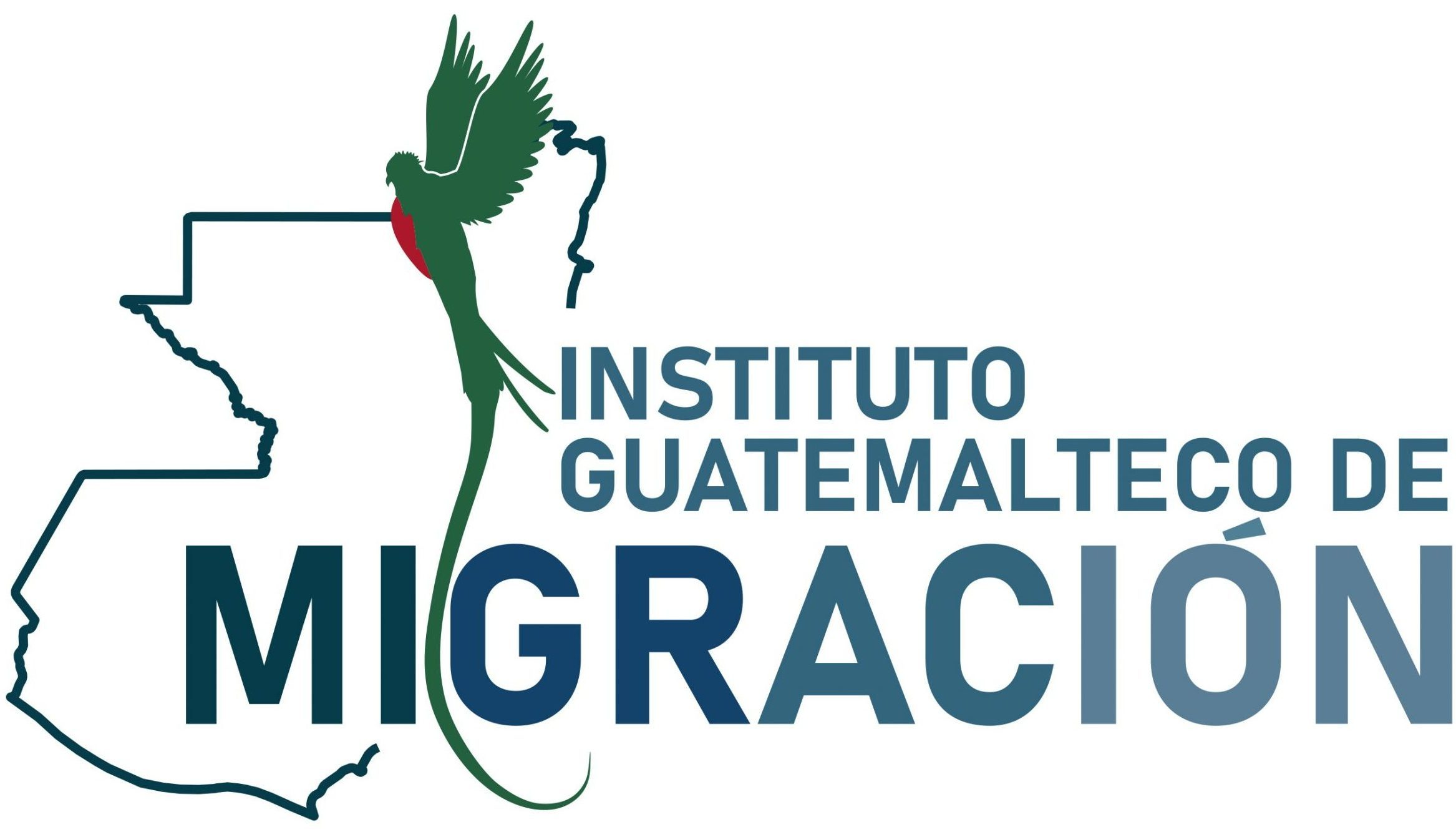

== History ==
On November 13, 1909, President Manuel Estrada Cabrera, established the Registry for Foreigners, authorizing the books respectively. The first Residence Sheet dates from 1964, still issued by the Ministry of Foreign Affairs, which would later become the Subdirectorate of Immigration Operations.

Due to the constant migratory movement, the Ministry of the Interior saw the need to create a specific entity to register and control migratory flows and through the Governmental Agreement dated June 29, 1963, the General Directorate of Migration was established. The first Residence Registration issued by the General Directorate of Migration was on July 10, 1968.

There are several places where the Immigration headquarters has operated, the most recent being the building on 8th Avenue and 12th Street in Zone 1, then the headquarters moved to Zone 8, then to Zone 9 and currently operates on 6th Avenue 3-11 Zone 4, Guatemala City. On April 30, 2017, the law and regulations of the General Directorate of Migration ceased to be in force.

On May 1, 2017, the Migration Code came into force, which contemplated the creation of the Guatemalan Institute of Migration, which would be the institution in charge of assuming all the responsibilities and functions of immigration services and procedures. Supporting the functions in Governmental Agreement 83-2017.

After complying with the provisions of the transition process, the Guatemalan Institute of Migration; as of August 3, 2020, it began with the functions framed in the Migration Code, due to the nature and characteristics of the process it is considered as something historic in Guatemala.
