= Maud de Boer-Buquicchio =

Dutch jurist (born 1944)

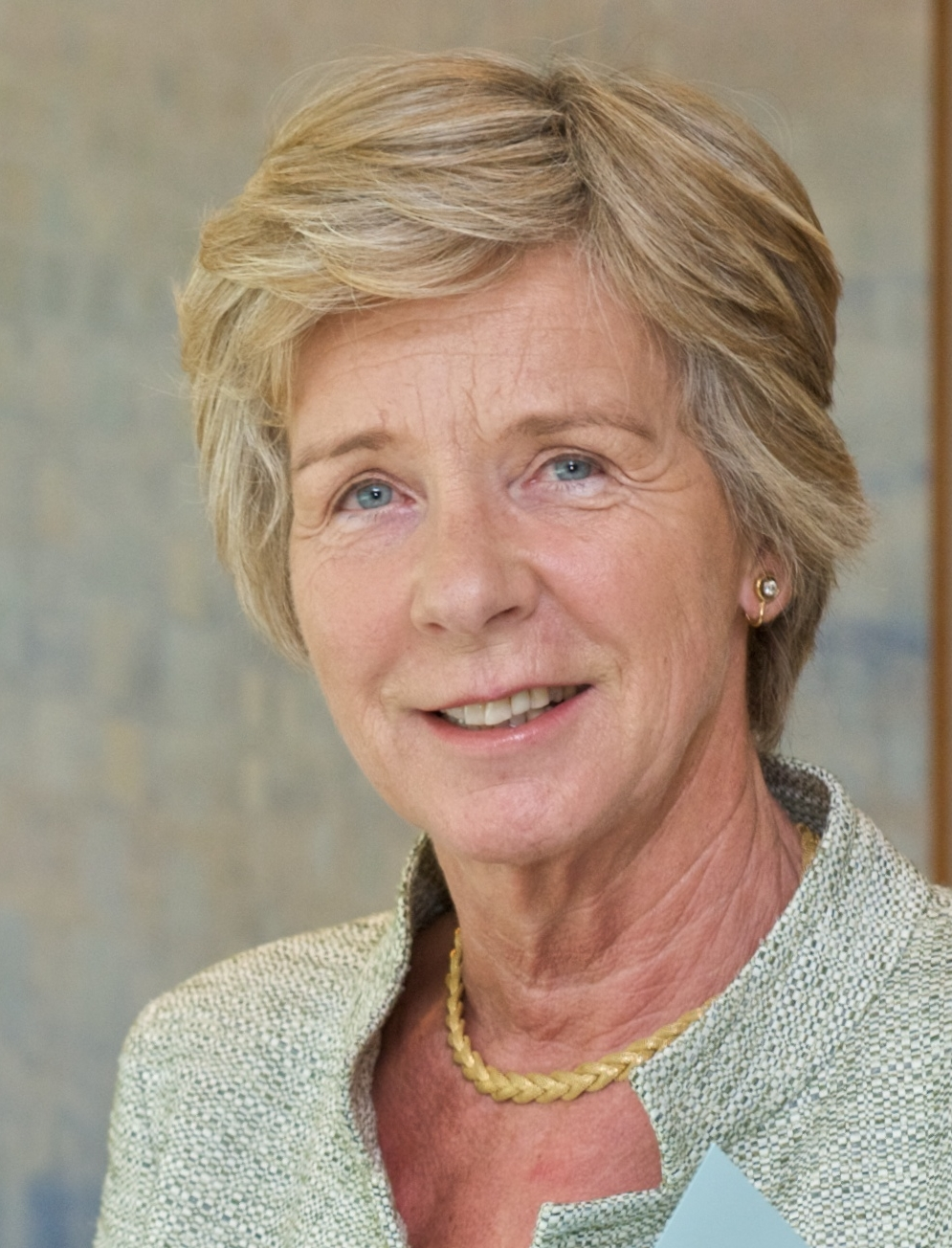
- De Boer-Buquicchio in 2012
- Born: December 28, 1944 (age 81); Hoensbroek, Netherlands
- Education: 1963–1965: French language and literature studies 1965–1969: Law studies
- Alma mater: Leiden University
- Occupations: Chair of the International Board of Trustees of ECPAT International Former Special Rapporteur on the sale of children, child prostitution and child pornography; Former Deputy Secretary General of the Council of Europe
- Board member of: International Centre for Missing & Exploited Children; WeProtect Global Alliance; ECPAT International
- Spouse: Gianni Buquicchio

Maud de Boer-Buquicchio (born December 28, 1944) is a Dutch jurist and former UN Special Rapporteur on the sale of children, child prostitution and child pornography. She served as Deputy Secretary General of the Council of Europe from 2002 and retired from the post in 2012 and was succeeded by Gabriella Battaini-Dragoni.

De Boer-Buquicchio was born in Hoensbroek, Netherlands, and studied French and French literature, and later law at Leiden University. She specialized in international relations and labor law, obtaining her degree in 1969 with a thesis on the equality of treatment between men and women under European Community law.

De Boer-Buquicchio joined the Council of Europe in 1969, and joined the legal Secretariat of the European Commission of Human Rights. She later worked in a variety of positions in the Council of Europe system, including in the private office of the Secretary General of the Council of Europe and as Deputy Registrar of the European Court of Human Rights. She was elected Deputy Secretary General in 2002, and re-elected in 2007.

== Philanthropy ==
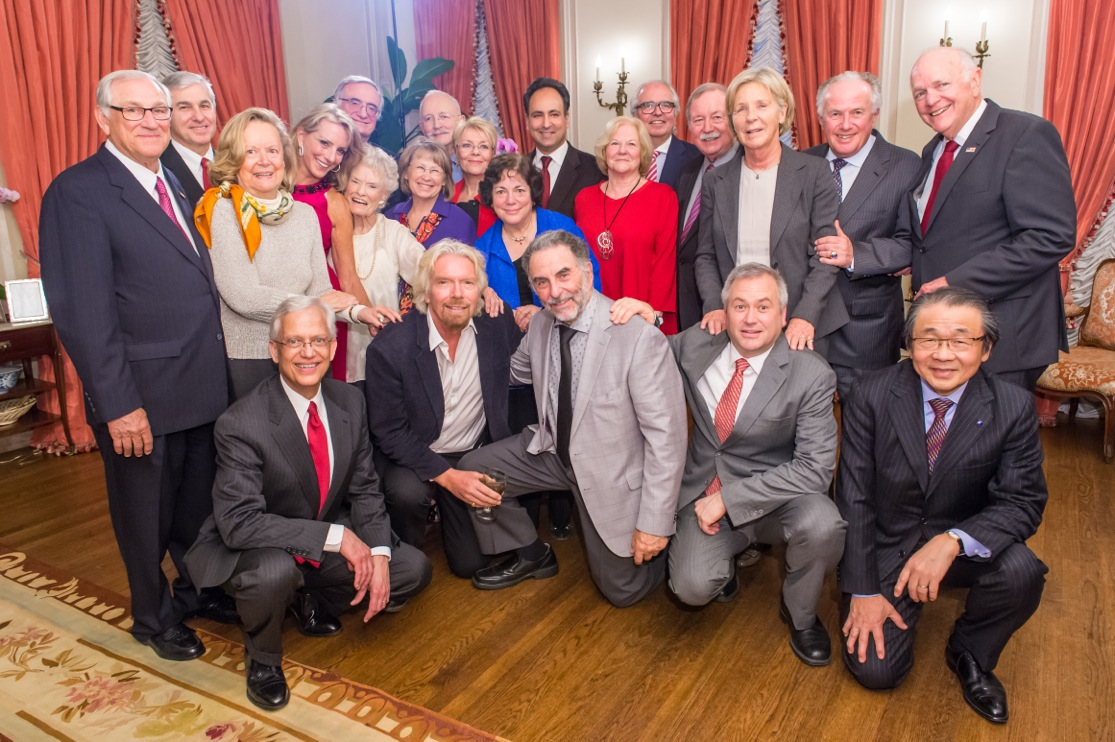
De Boer-Buquicchio with the Board of Directors of the International Centre for Missing & Exploited Children

De Boer-Buquicchio is a member of the Board of Directors of the International Centre for Missing & Exploited Children (ICMEC), a global nonprofit organization that combats child sexual exploitation, child pornography, and child abduction.

She was elected President of Missing Children Europe in 2013, a position she took over from former Advocate General at the European Court of Justice, Sir Francis Jacobs.

On February 14, 2022, De Boer-Buquicchio was appointed Chair of the International Board of Trustees of ECPAT International.

== Personal life ==
De Boer-Buquicchio is married and has three sons.

== Career ==
=== United Nations Special Rapporteur ===
On 8 May 2014, De Boer-Buquicchio was appointed Special Rapporteur on the sale of children, child prostitution and child pornography. From 12 to 18 May the following year she visited Armenia to investigate violence against children.

==== Visit to Japan ====
From 19 to 26 October 2015, De Boer-Buquicchio traveled around Japan (Tōkyō, Ōsaka, Kawanishi and Naha) for eight days to investigate child trade, sexual exploitation, production of child pornography etc. and she held a press conference at Japan National Press Club in Tokyo on 26 October (Note: The press conference can be watched on YouTube as of 2019.) to report the results. (Note: De Boer-Buquicchio's statements and questions-and-answers between her and journalists can also be read in the urls and (in Japanese).)

On 2 November 2015, the Japanese Ministry of Foreign Affairs (MOFA) issued a complaint to the Office of the High Commissioner for Human Rights (OHCHR) over De Boer-Buquicchio's comment of 26 October, which they quoted as saying that 13% of schoolgirls were involved in enjo kōsai ("compensated dating"), and asked her to disclose the source for the claim of 13%.

In response, the OHCHR released a clarification from the Special Rapporteur acknowledging that she had not received an official statistic concerning this matter while in Japan and explaining that the 13% figure was an estimate found in open sources that was mentioned – due to a mistranslation, as 30% – to highlight a phenomenon that must be urgently tackled.

Following the issuing of a press release by the Ministry of Foreign Affairs on 9 November in which it requested the withdrawal of the remark and that the report be based on objective data, she addressed on 10 November a letter to the Permanent Representative at the Permanent Mission of Japan to the United Nations in which she stated that she would not refer to this estimate in her Report to the UN Human Rights Council.

The final report was presented to the UN Human Rights Council in New York on 3 March 2016.
