= Miklós Haraszti =

Hungarian politician, writer and professor

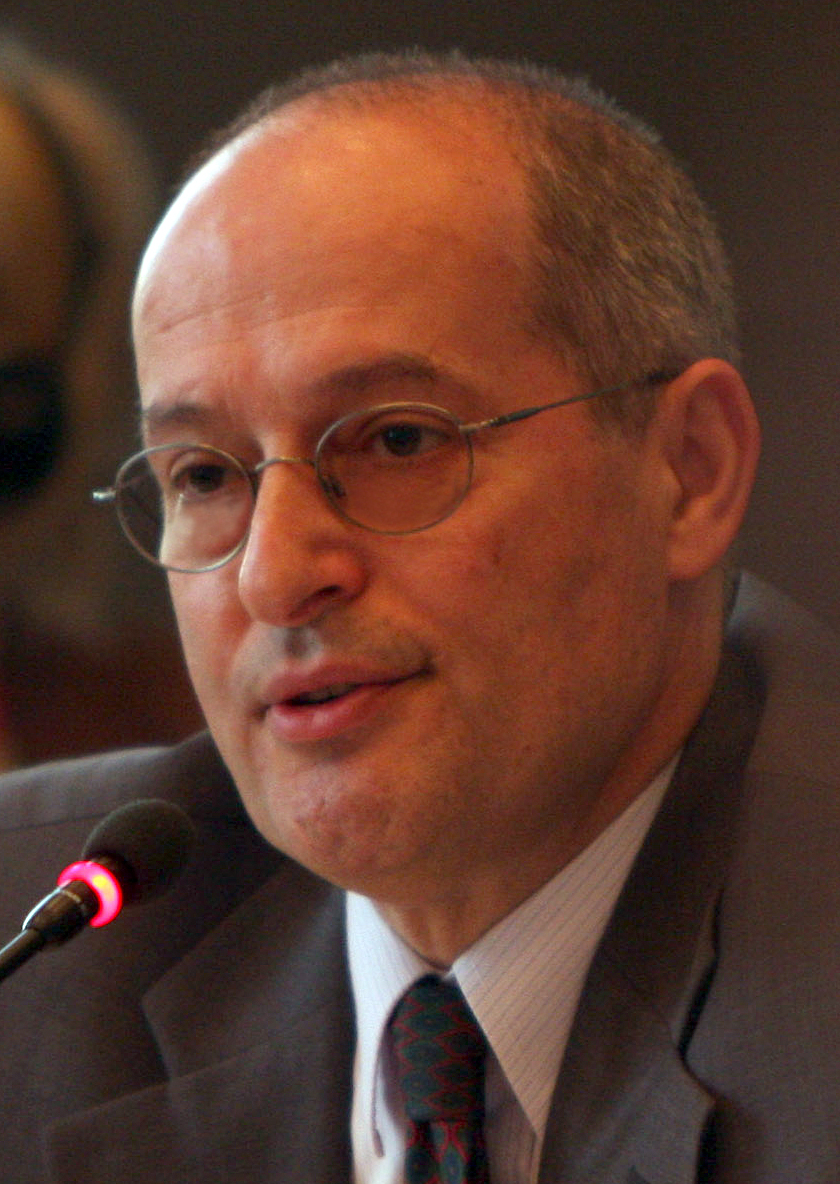
- Photo by Mikhail Evstafiev

OSCE Representative on Freedom of the Media
- In office 10 March 2004 – 10 March 2010
- Preceded by: Freimut Duve
- Succeeded by: Dunja Mijatovic

Personal details
- Born: 2 January 1945 (age 81) Jerusalem
- Party: SZDSZ
- Spouse: Antónia Szenthe
- Children: 2
- Occupation: writer, journalist, human rights advocate, university professor

Miklós Haraszti (born 2 January 1945) is a Hungarian politician, writer, journalist, human rights advocate and university professor. He served the maximum of two terms as the OSCE Representative on Freedom of the Media from 2004 to 2010. In the 2010s, he served as a visiting professor at Columbia Law School’s School of International and Public Affairs. New York and visiting professor at the Central European University (CEU), Department of Public Policy.

== Biography ==
Haraszti was born Jerusalem. He studied philosophy and literature at Budapest University. During his student years, he started publish literary works. He was expelled from university because of his left-wing dissent activities. In 1973, he stood trial and was sentenced for his book The Worker in a Worker’s State, which had circulated in samizdat. Another book of his, The Velvet Prison, has also been translated into several languages. In 1976 he co-founded the Hungarian Democratic Opposition Movement and in 1980 he became editor of the samizdat periodical Beszélő.

In 1989, Haraszti participated in the "roundtable" negotiations on transition to free elections. A member of the Hungarian Parliament from 1990 to 1994, he then moved on to lecture on democratization and media politics at numerous universities.

In 2012, Haraszti was appointed UN Special Rapporteur on the situation of human rights in Belarus. He served until October 2018 when he was succeeded by Anaïs Marin.

== Personal life ==
He is married. His wife is Antónia Szenthe. They have two daughters.

== Selected publications ==
=== Essays ===
- "The Hungarian Independent Peace Movement". Telos 61 (Fall 1984). New York: Telos Press

=== Books ===
- A Worker in a Worker's State; Piece-Rates in Hungary. Penguin Books, 1977. ISBN 978-0140219883
- The Velvet Prison; Artists Under State Socialism. Basic Books, 1987. ISBN 978-0465098002
