= Special Rapporteur on the human rights of migrants =

UN mandate to protect the human rights of migrants

Special Rapporteur on the Human Rights of Migrants
- Incumbent; Gehad Madi since October 2023
- Reports to: UN High Commissioner for Human Rights
- Formation: 27 April 1999; 27 years ago
- Website: Special procedures: Migrants

The position of Special Rapporteur on the human rights of migrants was established in 1999, within the framework of the United Nations, to examine ways and means of overcoming obstacles to the full and effective protection of the human rights of migrants.

== UN mandate ==
The UN Commission on Human Rights created this position on 27 April 1999, via a resolution that also defined the mandate. Following the replacement of the UN Commission on Human Rights by the UN Human Rights Council in 2006, the latter now holds responsibility and exercises oversight.

The appointee is not a United Nations employee but is entrusted with a mandate by the UN; the UN Human Rights Council issued a code of conduct for this role. The mandate holder's independent status is crucial for the impartial performance of their duties. The term of office is limited to a maximum of two three-year periods.

The Special Rapporteur conducts thematic studies and develops guidelines for improving human rights. At the invitation of states, the Special Rapporteur undertakes country visits and may offer recommendations in an advisory capacity. They examine communications and submit proposals to states on how to remedy any shortcomings. They also conduct follow-up procedures to assess the implementation of recommendations. To this end, they prepare annual reports for the UN Human Rights Council.

== Office holders ==
- 1999–2005 Gabriela Rodríguez Pizarro – Costa Rica
- 2005–2011 Jorge A. Bustamante – Mexico
- 2011–2017 François Crépeau – Canada
- 2017–2023 Felipe González Morales – Chile
- Since 2023 Gehad Madi – Egypt
