= Israeli war crimes in the Gaza war =

Violations of laws of war

Since the beginning of the Gaza war on 7 October 2023, the Israeli military and authorities committed numerous war crimes, such as the collective punishment of the Palestinian people, attacks on civilians in densely populated areas (including bombings of hospitals and medical facilities, refugee camps, schools and educational institutions, and municipal services); the torture and executions of civilians; sexual violence including rape; and genocide. Further war crime charges against Israel include forced evacuations, mistreatment and torture of Palestinian prisoners, and the destruction of cultural heritage. Humanitarian organizations such as Human Rights Watch, Amnesty International, B'tselem, and Oxfam, as well as human rights groups and experts, including the UN Independent International Commission of Inquiry and United Nations special rapporteurs, have documented these actions.

Israel has faced legal charges for its conduct in the war. At the International Court of Justice, Israel was charged with committing genocide in Gaza. In May 2024, the International Criminal Court (ICC) issued arrest warrants against Israeli prime minister Benjamin Netanyahu and Israeli defence minister Yoav Gallant for war crimes and crimes against humanity, including using starvation as a weapon of war.

While Israel has faced international condemnation for its alleged war crimes, it has also maintained continued support from the United States. In October 2023, U.S. Secretary of State Antony Blinken indicated the Biden administration had no red lines for Israeli actions where it would stop military support. As Israel's largest supplier of weapons, the U.S. has been accused of complicity in Israel's war crimes.

== Proportionality and distinction ==
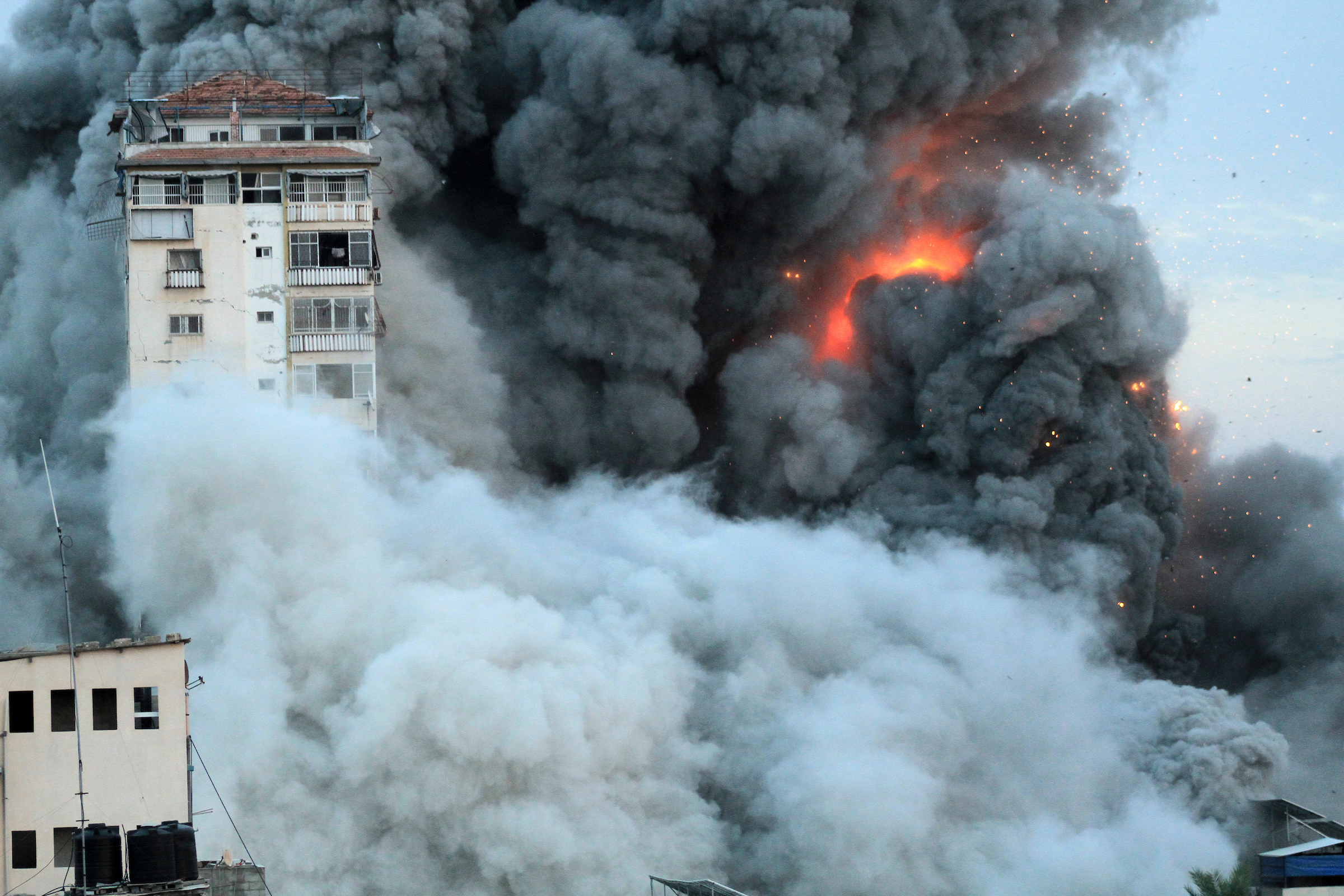
Palestine Tower destroyed in Gaza, October 2023.

Israel's adherence to the principles of distinction and proportionality, as required by the laws of war, has been questioned. The former principle requires armies to distinguish between legitimate military targets and protected civilians. The latter principle requires that when attacking a legitimate military target the expected harm caused to civilians or civilian objects must be proportionate and not excessive (disproportionate) in relation to the military advantage anticipated.

Human Rights Watch has stated that the overall civilian death toll, and Israel's use of powerful weapons in Gaza's densely populated neighbourhoods, raised "serious questions" about the legality of Israel's conduct. Human Rights Watch further argued that a higher proportion of casualties among women and children is indicative of a lack of proportionality, demonstrating what they describe as "a disregard toward Palestinian lives". Amnesty International accused Israel of war crimes. In a report they published they analyzed five incidents between 7 and 12 October where the Israeli Defence Forces (IDF) targeted residential areas in Gaza. It found that in several cases the IDF struck targets with no evidence of military activity and that these attacks were "indiscriminate" in nature. Anonymous IDF officials cited in a report by +972 Magazine indicated a "loosening of constraints" in the rules of engagement, and that in numerous cases the IDF struck targets despite no evidence of military activity. The report claims that the rationale behind such attacks was "to harm Palestinian civil society" and, according to one source cited by the report, to "lead civilians to put pressure on Hamas".

Experts cited by The Washington Post argue that certain Israeli airstrikes show that Israel has a tolerance for civilian casualties "orders of magnitude greater" than that of the US in its war against ISIS. United Nations (UN) officials and human rights groups have argued that Israel has not done enough to protect civilians. In March 2024, the UN said that more children were killed in Gaza in four months than in four years of all the wars around the world combined. Philippe Lazzarini, head of the UN's agency for Palestinian refugees, declared: "This war is a war on children".

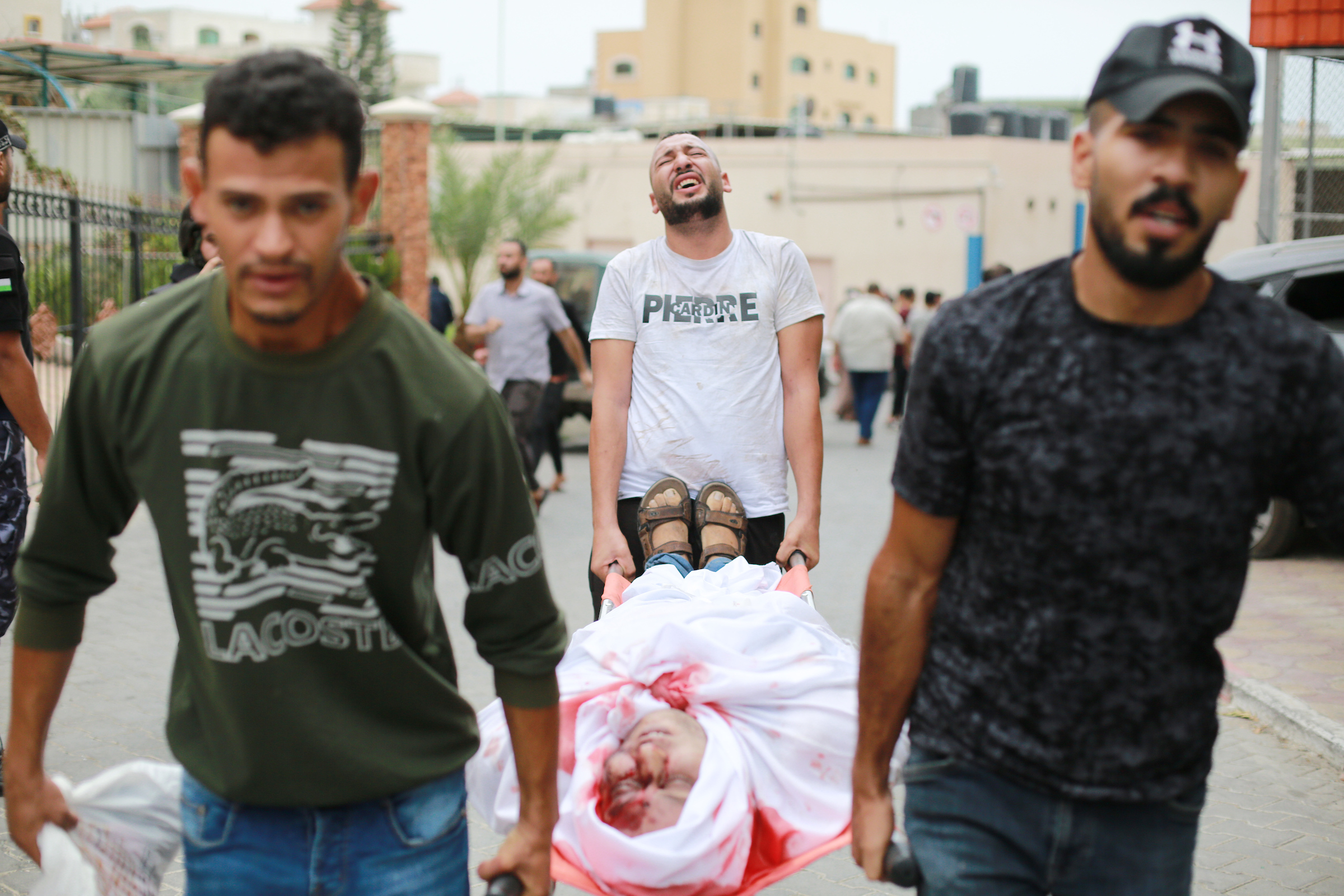
Three men carry a dead woman to the Indonesia Hospital in Jabalia refugee camp, October 2023.

Emanuela-Chiara Gillard, an associate fellow at Chatham House, argued that, given the size and nature of the October 7 attacks, Israel has the right of self-defence that could include its stated military aim of destroying Hamas. She added that Hamas has threatened to repeat its assault and eradicate the state of Israel. According to The Economist, the law of armed conflict and international humanitarian law grant Israel flexibility when it comes to taking military action against Hamas, but in its view, Israel's "definition of military targets is being stretched to breaking-point".

Amichai Cohen, an Israeli lawyer, alleges that Israel does not deliberately target civilians but that Hamas's tactics make it hard to take action without affecting civilians. Jill Goldenziel, an American law professor, argued that if Israel conducted every strike legally and with utmost precision, civilian casualties in war would still remain. She stated that the goal of a proportionality analysis is to decide whether attacks are excessive. Israeli security officials state that their proportionality criteria in this conflict are unchanged and that they receive legal advice in relation to strikes. Other Israeli officials, speaking anonymously, acknowledged that Israel has struck "private residences and public structures, like the Gaza Parliament and the Islamic University", which would not previously have been considered valuable enough to justify the risk to civilian life.

In April 2024, Human Rights Watch found that Israel violated international law by launching an airstrike on an apartment building in Gaza, killing 106 people, including 54 children, as there were no viable military targets in the area.

In June 2024, the UN Human Rights Office described possible violations of the rules of proportionality and distinction during the Nuseirat refugee camp massacre. Later the same month, the UN Human Rights Office released a report on six Israeli attacks in which the IDF may have "systematically violated the principles of distinction, proportionality, and precautions in attack". Following the Al-Tabaeen school attack, Tariq Kenney-Shawa, a policy fellow at Al-Shabaka suggested the attack violated the laws of proportionality. In response to an Israeli social media campaign that stated "there are no innocent civilians" in Gaza, Mark Kersten, a professor at University of the Fraser Valley, stated, "It is exactly what atrocity perpetrators say". In June 2024, a UN Commission of Inquiry found the scale of Israel's killing of Palestinians constituted a crime against humanity.

By August 2024, data from Gaza indicated the war was one of the deadliest of the 21st century. Pope Francis suggested Israel's attacks on Lebanon and Gaza were disproportionate.

== Indiscriminate attacks ==
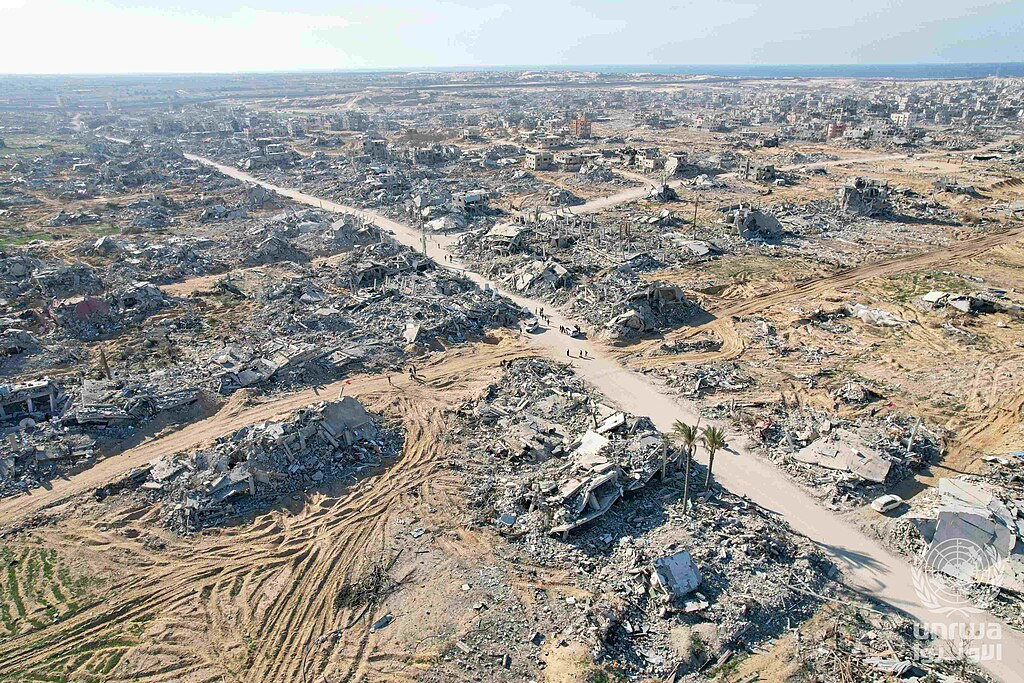
Aerial view showing the destruction of Rafah in January 2025

In the first two days of the war, the Israeli Air Force attacked 1,500 targets in Gaza. Yedioth Ahronoth reported that Netanyahu then demanded to know why they hadn't hit 5,000, saying "I'm not interested in targets ... Take down houses, bomb with everything you have." In the first week of the war, the Israeli Defense Forces (IDF) carried out 6,000 airstrikes across Gaza, killing over 3,300 civilians and injuring over 12,000 people. The strikes hit specifically protected locations, including hospitals, markets, refugee camps, mosques, educational facilities, and entire neighbourhoods. A group of UN special rapporteurs asserted that Israel's airstrikes are indiscriminate and amount to collective punishment. They stated that these airstrikes are "absolutely prohibited under international law and amounts to a war crime".

During two airstrikes on 10 and 22 October 2023, the IDF used Joint Direct Attack Munitions in attacks described by Amnesty International as "either direct attacks on civilians" or "indiscriminate attacks". On 24 October, UN Secretary-General António Guterres called for an immediate ceasefire, after stating Israel had committed "clear violations" of international humanitarian law. On 13 November 2023, Israel shelled the Gaza Reconstruction Committee, leading three Arab states to condemn the attack, with Jordan calling it "a heinous war crime to add to Israel's criminal record." On 12 January 2024, the spokesperson for the Office of the U.N. High Commissioner for Human Rights stated Israel's attacks were failing to account for distinction, proportionality and precautions, thus leaving Israel exposed to liability for war crimes.

In February 2024, the IDF bombed and destroyed the Belgium government's Gaza development office. In response, Belgium summoned the Israeli ambassador and condemned the "destruction of civilian infrastructure" as a violation of international law. (Note: Two weeks after the bombing, the Belgian Minister of Development Cooperation Caroline Gennez stated Israel had still not responded to a request for an investigation.) On 6 February, the UN stated an Israeli assault on Rafah could lead to war crimes.

On 22 March 2024, Al Jazeera released a video retrieved from an Israeli drone showing four unarmed Palestinians in Khan Younis who were killed by Israeli air attacks. Two were killed instantly, and the others were killed while trying to stumble and crawl away. Al-Jazeera reported that "it is clear from the pictures that these Palestinians were unarmed and posed no threat to anything or anyone". This footage was described by the UN's special rapporteur Francesca Albanese as a part of the "colossal amount of evidence" of war crimes committed in Gaza by Israel. According to the IDF, they had encountered militants in civilian clothes retrieving previously hidden weapons in that area.

Amnesty International called Israel's indiscriminate attacks illegal and a violation of international law. Secretary General of Amnesty International Agnès Callamard said the 16-year-old "illegal blockade has made Gaza the world's biggest open-air prison", and the international community must now act to avert it from becoming a giant cemetery. Human Rights Watch reported that Israel has completely shut down communications and put lives at risk in Gaza by carrying out relentless airstrikes and damage to the main communications infrastructure, electricity cuts, fuel blockades, and deliberate shutdowns through technical measures. Deborah Brown, senior technology researcher at Human Rights Watch, said a deliberate shutdown, or restriction of Internet access, is a human rights violation and can be deadly during a crisis. A complete disruption of communications, such as that experienced in Gaza, can provide cover for crimes and impunity, while further undermining humanitarian efforts and putting lives at risk.

Following reports about Israel's use of automated systems for target selection, experts in international humanitarian law stated they were alarmed by accounts that the IDF authorized killing up to 20 uninvolved civilians for getting a single militant, even if they were low-ranking or had low military importance. In May 2024, Amnesty International called for war crimes investigations into three Israeli airstrikes that had killed 44 civilians. The same month, following the Al-Mawasi refugee camp attack, Finnish Foreign Minister Elina Valtonen stated that the orders of the International Court of Justice (ICJ) and international humanitarian law must be respected. In June 2024, UNRWA chief Philippe Lazzarini termed the destruction of UNRWA's Gaza headquarters as "blatant disregard of international humanitarian law". In June 2024, Doctors Without Borders suggested Israel was violating international humanitarian law, stating, "We can no longer accept the statement that Israel is taking 'all precautions'". The European Union warned Israel in August 2024 that "targeting critical life-saving infrastructure constitutes a war crime". The IDF stated it would investigate whether there was a breach of international law following an army commanders' order to destroy a water reservoir in Rafah. (Note: Mark Zeitoun, the director of Geneva Water Hub, stated the destruction of the Canada water reservoir was "certainly a breach of international humanitarian law".)

=== Refugee camps ===
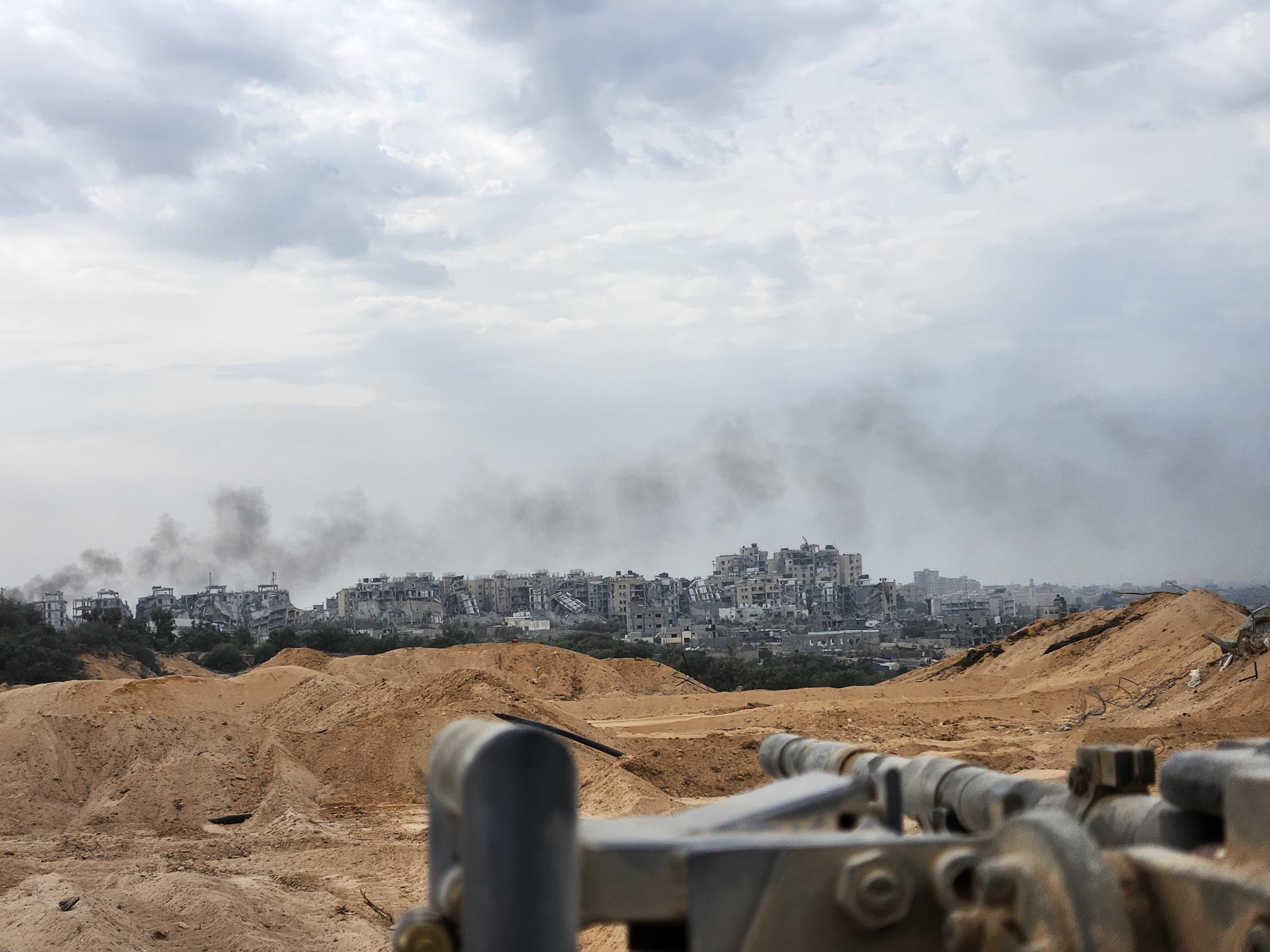
Damaged buildings in the Gaza Strip on 12 November 2023

On 9 October 2023, the IDF carried out a mass-casualty airstrike on the Jabalia refugee camp market. The attack resulted in the deaths of over sixty civilians and extensive damage to the market. As a result of Israeli airstrikes in other areas, displaced individuals sought refuge in the camp, causing the market to be densely populated at the time of the strike. An airstrike on 31 October 2023 that killed 106 civilians near the Nuseirat refugee camp was deemed an apparent war crime by Human Rights Watch. On 1 November, following two airstrikes on the Jabalia refugee camp, the United Nations Human Rights Office stated, "We have serious concerns that these are disproportionate attacks that could amount to war crimes."

On the same day, the IDF carried out an airstrike on the densely populated Al-Shati refugee camp. Palestinian media reported that this strike resulted in numerous civilian casualties and the destruction of four mosques, including the al-Gharbi mosque, Yassin mosque, and al-Sousi mosque, all of which were confirmed destroyed by satellite footage. The airstrikes in the Al-Shati camp were described as a "massacre against an entire neighborhood" by the Ministry of Health.

On 24 December 2023, 68 people were killed in an airstrike on the Al-Maghazi refugee camp. According to Al Jazeera, the vast majority of victims were civilians. They also noted that the camp was one of the areas the IDF had previously told Gazans to evacuate to. Hamas called the attack a "massacre" and a "war crime". Israel later determined that incorrect munitions were used in the attack and expressed regret that non-combatants were harmed.

=== Schools and shelters ===
On 17 October 2023, an Israeli airstrike hit a UNRWA school sheltering 4,000 refugees in the Al-Maghazi refugee camp, killing six and injuring dozens. Philippe Lazzarini, the UNRWA Commissioner-General, called it "outrageous" and said that it showed "a flagrant disregard for the lives of civilians". The UN accused Israel of lethally bombing three of its shelters on 2 November 2023. On 27 December 2023, the UN stated Israel had killed 142 UN employees in Gaza thus far. On 12 January 2024, the UN Secretary-General for Human Rights stated that at least 319 internally displaced persons were killed and 1,135 injured in UNRWA shelters.

On 24 January 2024, the UN accused Israel of firing two tank shells into a refugee facility in Khan Younis, killing nine people and wounding 75. Israel denied bombing the facility. (Note: The following day, Thomas White, the affairs director of UNRWA, stated, "This is not an isolated incident. This is happening all across Khan Younis and has been a pattern in other parts of Gaza.") Thomas White, a senior UN official in Gaza, called the attack part of "a consistent failure to uphold the fundamental principles of international humanitarian law". The Palestinian Ministry of Education reported that 65 UN schools in Gaza had been damaged or destroyed, which the Save the Children's director for Palestine called "beyond unconscionable".

In June 2024, the Foreign Ministry of Jordan condemned the Al-Sardi school attack, stating, "These actions and crimes… contradict all human and moral values and represent war crimes against the international community as a whole." In response to the Al-Sardi school attack, UNRWA chief Philippe Lazzarini stated that attacking UN buildings showed a "blatant disregard of international humanitarian law". Following the Al-Tabaeen school attack in August 2024, the foreign ministry of Jordan called it a "a flagrant violation of international law and of all humanitarian values," while the government of Turkey stated it was a "crime against humanity". In September 2024, an Israeli airstrike killed six UN employees at a shelter for displaced people, leading UN secretary general Antonio Guterres to call it a "dramatic violation" of international humanitarian law.

Analyses by CNN, The New York Times, and Sky News all found that Israel had bombed areas it had previously told civilians to evacuate to. The New York Times found that Israel had dropped 2,000-pound bombs in areas where civilians were ordered to evacuate to. CNN stated it had verified at least three locations Israel bombed after telling civilians it was safe to go there. An NBC News investigation found Palestinians were killed in airstrikes in seven areas that the military had designated as safe zones.

=== Places of worship ===
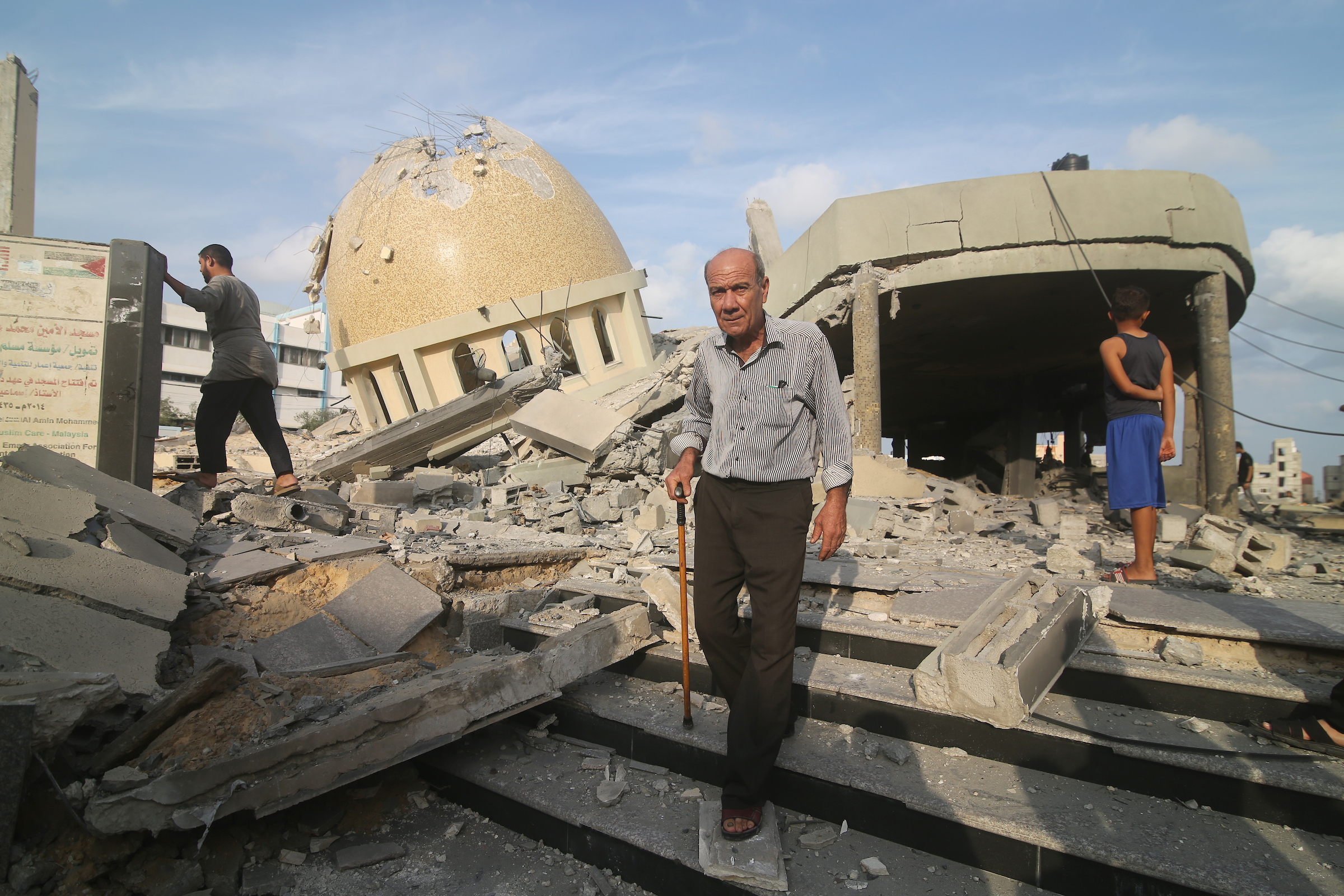
A mosque destroyed by an Israeli airstrike, Khan Younis, 8 October 2023

Under the Rome Statute, it is a war crime to intentionally attack places of worship in non-international conflicts, as long as they are not "used by a party to a conflict for acts harmful to the enemy". On 19 October, the Israeli Air Force damaged the Church of Saint Porphyrius in an attack which targeted a nearby command-and-control center, according to the Israeli military. Hundreds of Christians and Muslims were sheltering in the church and the strike killed 16 people. The Greek Orthodox Patriarchate of Jerusalem condemned it as "a war crime that cannot be ignored". Following an investigation, Amnesty International stated the church strike was indiscriminate and should be investigated as a war crime.

On 16 December 2023, the Latin Patriarchate of Jerusalem stated the Israeli army had killed two women sheltering at the Holy Family Parish, stating, "They were shot in cold blood inside the premises of the Parish, where there are no belligerents." Pope Francis described the Israeli attack on the church as terrorism.

=== Residential areas ===
An independent United Nations expert said that both Israel's widespread bombing of homes and civilian sites in Gaza and the indiscriminate firing of rockets by Hamas are "war crimes". Balakrishnan Rajagopal stated Israeli strikes had destroyed or damaged 45% of homes in the Palestinian territory, causing "enormous cost in human lives". The UN Special Rapporteur stated targeting of residential areas is strictly prohibited under international law. He further stated that engaging in military actions with the knowledge that it will result in the deliberate destruction of civilian residences and infrastructure, leading to the uninhabitability of entire cities, constitutes a violation of international law.

A +972 Magazine investigation found the Israeli army had expanded authorization for bombing non-military targets. Research conducted by Dr. Yagil Levy at the Open University of Israel confirmed the +972 report, stating Israel was "deliberately targeting residential blocks to cause mass civilian casualties".

On 31 October 2023, an Israeli airstrike hit Al-Muhandeseen Tower (the 'Engineers Tower'), a six-story apartment building in Gaza City, killing at least 106 civilians, including 34 women and 54 children. About 350 civilians were in and around the building, including 150 seeking shelter after being moved out of other parts of the city. Without warning, at about 2:30pm, four missiles struck the building within 10 seconds, completely demolishing it. At the time of the attack, children were playing soccer outside the building, and residents and sheltering civilians were charging their phones in the building's ground-floor grocery store. The watchdog Airwars reported 133 to 164 civilians were killed, including 36 women and 67 to 77 children. On 4 April 2024, following an investigation, Human Rights Watch stated they found no evidence of a military target in the vicinity at the time of the attack, making the strike "unlawfully indiscriminate under the laws of war."

=== Lebanon ===
On 5 November 2023, an Israeli airstrike hit a car near Ainata, Lebanon, killing three children and their grandmother, and injuring their mother. The Israeli military admitted to striking the vehicle. Human Rights Watch stated that their killings should be investigated as an apparent war crime. Najib Mikati, Lebanon's caretaker prime minister, called the attack a "heinous crime" and said that Lebanon would file a complaint to the UN Security Council. Following an Israeli airstrike on the Iranian consulate in Damascus, the Lebanese Foreign Ministry called it a "breach of international law and a serious violation of the Vienna agreements for diplomatic and consular relations". The UN Human Rights Office said the attack "violated the prohibition on the use of armed force against another state".

=== Humanitarian aid ===
The Gaza war has been deadliest conflict for United Nations workers in world history. By March 2024, at least 196 UN relief workers had been killed and more than 150 facilities attacked in the Gaza Strip.

Following the death of one of their aid workers — the fifth American aid worker killed in Gaza — the American Near East Refugee Aid released a statement: "We demand an independent investigation into his death, which threatens our team’s ability to function safely and deliver aid to civilians facing starvation". In March 2024, Israel bombed a United Nations food distribution center, killing one UN staff member and wounding 22 others. (Note: In reaction to news of the bombing, the US Secretary of State said that Israel should not bomb "clearly marked" humanitarian facilities.) It was one of the UN's last remaining distribution centers, leading the organization's humanitarian aid chief Martin Griffiths to state that aid teams "must be protected".

A New York Times investigation showed six Western aid groups had humanitarian sites hit by Israeli strikes, even though the locations were shared with the IDF. In April 2024, Belgium recalled its ambassador to Israel after an Enabel aid worker and his son were killed by an Israel airstrike. The Belgian Foreign Minister Hadja Lahbib reacted by stating, "Bombing civilian areas and populations is contrary to international law." The Quincy Institute found fourteen incidents where Israel attacked humanitarian aid workers, despite being identified as civilians.

==== Flour massacre ====
On 29 February 2024, more than 100 people seeking aid were killed in Gaza City during an incident that became known as the flour massacre. Belgian Deputy Prime Minister Petra de Sutter stated the massacre was a "flagrant violation of international humanitarian law". Josep Borrell stated it was a serious violation of international humanitarian law. The Turkish Ministry of Foreign Affairs called the attack a crime against humanity. The Omani Foreign Ministry called the attack a violation of international law. Amnesty International announced it was launching an investigation. The United Nations Human Rights Office also called for an investigation, stating it had "recorded at least 14 incidents involving shooting and shelling of people gathered to receive desperately needed supplies".

==== World Central Kitchen drone strikes ====
On 1 April 2024, an Israeli drone fired three consecutive missiles at three cars belonging to the World Central Kitchen (WCK), killing seven aid workers who had been distributing food in the northern Gaza. The president of Refugees International called the killings "part of a clear pattern" and a war crime. Doctors Without Borders stated the killings were an example of how "international humanitarian law is not respected". The Polish Foreign Ministry stated, "Poland objects to the disregard for international humanitarian law". The Cyprus Foreign Ministry stated, "[International humanitarian law] principles are absolute: humanitarian aid workers must always be respected and protected." Ben Saul, a UN special rapporteur, stated, "It could well be a violation of international humanitarian law". Jose Andres, the founder of World Central Kitchen, stated Israel needed "to stop this indiscriminate killing."

==== Gaza aid distribution massacres ====
On 27 May 2025, the Gaza Humanitarian Foundation (GHF), an American and Israeli-backed organization, began distributing aid in Tel al-Sultan, Rafah. Thousands of Palestinians gathered, leading to chaotic scenes. Reports emerged of Israeli tanks opening fire on the crowd, resulting in at least three deaths and 48 injuries. The IDF claimed they fired warning shots to control the situation, while a UN spokesperson indicated that most injuries were due to gunfire from the IDF. The next days saw escalating violence. On 31 May, three Palestinians were killed while attempting to reach the aid center. By 1 June, it was reported that 32 civilians were killed and over 250 wounded at the aid site. The Palestine Red Crescent Society confirmed retrieving at least 23 bodies and numerous injured individuals from the area. By 2 June, at least 75 civilians were killed and more than 400 others were injured by Israeli forces. By 12 June, at least 223 Palestinians were killed and more than 1,800 others were injured while trying to reach the aid distribution centers.

These incidents have drawn international condemnation. UN Secretary-General António Guterres called for an independent investigation into the shootings. The head of UNRWA, Philippe Lazzarini, condemned the US-backed aid model in Gaza, saying it is a “distraction from atrocities” and "a waste of resources".

=== 18 March attacks ===
On 18 March 2025, Israel bombed Gaza, further violating (Note: The IDF killed over 140 during the ceasefire, according to the Gaza Health Ministry.) and ending a two-month ceasefire agreement with Hamas, and beginning a significant military operation. The Israeli airstrikes killed at least 404 Palestinians, including 183 children and 94 women, according to Gaza’s Health Ministry, making them the deadliest since the conflict began in 2023. Human Rights Watch stated that Israeli military forces caused deaths and unnecessary suffering of Palestinian patients while occupying hospitals in the Gaza Strip, amounting to war crimes. They further said that Israeli forces denied water and electricity to the sick and wounded, mistreated and forcibly displaced patients and health workers, and destroyed medical facilities.

Amnesty International condemned the attacks, stating, "Israel's genocide and its unlawful air strikes have already caused unprecedented humanitarian suffering in Gaza. Today, we are back to square one. Since 2 March, Israel has re-imposed a total siege on Gaza blocking the entry of all humanitarian aid, medicine, and commercial supplies, including fuel and food, in flagrant violation of international law. Israel has also cut off electricity to Gaza's main operational desalination plant. And today the Israeli military has once again started issuing mass 'evacuation' orders displacing Palestinians." The United Nations reported that one of its staff members was killed, and five others were injured in a strike on a UN guesthouse in Gaza. UN Secretary-General António Guterres called for an investigation, emphasizing the protection of UN premises under international law. The Arab League condemned the attacks, labeling them as acts of genocide and ethnic cleansing, and urged the UN and the United States to take action against Israel.

== Ceasefire violations by the IDF ==
Since the implementation of the ceasefire between Israel and Hamas on 19 January 2025, the IDF bombed and shelled Gaza and the West Bank, and shot people in a number of incidents, violating the agreement. According to the Gaza Ministry of Health, the IDF killed over 140 people in two months during the ceasefire. The Intercept reported that Israeli forces 150 killed during this period, including civilians, journalists, and aid workers, in addition to cutting electricity and blocking the entry of food and fuel, likely constituting war crimes.

== Summary executions ==
Summary execution refers to the killing of persons who are not actively taking part in hostilities, even if otherwise they are combatants. It includes killing unarmed, surrendering or wounded people instead of giving the benefit of a fair trial. Regarding summary executions in Gaza, Middlesex University professor William Schabas stated, "It's not really important to demonstrate that they're civilians. Summary executions even of fighters, even of combatants is a war crime."

OHCHR stated on 20 December it had received allegations of Israeli soldiers summarily killing at least eleven unarmed men in Rimal. Al Jazeera reported the number summary execution of 15 people during an apartment raid. The execution was witnessed by the families of the men. Euro-Med Monitor stated they believe this is part a pattern of "systematic" killing. They added that "In at least 13 of field executions, we corroborated that it was arbitrary on the part of the Israeli forces." On 26 December 2023, Euro-Med Monitor submitted a file to the International Criminal Court and the UN that documented dozens of cases of summary executions carried out by Israeli forces, and called for an investigation.

In March 2024, video of an Israeli soldier bragging about killing an elderly deaf man hiding under his bed was released. The Council on American-Islamic Relations condemned the killing as an execution and war crime. The Israeli military stated they would begin a probe into the incident.

Defense officials told Haaretz that the Israeli army had created kill zones in Gaza, in which any person who crossed an "invisible line" was killed. Israeli soldiers gave testimony to +972 Magazine stating soldiers were given authorization to shoot Palestinian civilians at will.

=== Children ===
Mark Perlmutter, an American doctor working in Gaza, stated Israeli snipers were deliberately targeting children. He stated "No toddler gets shot twice by mistake by the 'world's best sniper.' And they're dead-center shots." In a letter addressed to US President Joe Biden, a group of American doctors and nurses returning from Gaza stated, "Every one of us on a daily basis treated pre-teen children who were shot in the head and chest".

In October 2024, The New York Times reported compiled testimony from 44 doctors, nurses, and paramedics who treated multiple cases of preteen children with gunshot wounds to the head or chest in Gaza. The Israeli army reacted to the experiences of these health care workers with a statement that did not directly confirm whether investigations into the shootings of children had been conducted or if any soldiers faced disciplinary action for firing at them. In response to claims alleging that the report was based on "fabricated evidence", The New York Times issued a statement defending the integrity of the piece, emphasizing that it had undergone rigorous editing and verification, including consultations with experts and the use of supporting photographs, which they deemed "too horrific for publication." In an interview with Mother Jones, Dr. Feroze Sidhwa explained the circumstances of the children's death, stating, "On the occasion when the child survived long enough and there was family... to ask what happened—they would say, the kids were just playing. I never heard from a family that they were in a crossfire".

In June 2026, Srinivasan Muralidhar, chairman of the Independent International Commission of Inquiry on the Occupied Palestinian Territory under the United Nations, stated that Israeli forces have continued to commit genocide in Gaza by deliberately targeting and killing Palestinian children, citing a report published by the commission. In response, Israeli officials dismissed the report and denied that Israel is committing a genocide, as well as calling the report as "a propaganda piece as outrageous as its previous ones."

=== Mass graves ===
A mass grave with 283 bodies was uncovered in April 2024 at Khan Younis's Nasser medical complex in Gaza City. Further mass graves with several hundreds of bodies were found in the courtyard of Al-Shifa Hospital. Reports indicated that some of the bodies were found with their hands and feet tied. Following the discovery of the mass graves, UN human rights chief Volker Türk called for an independent investigation on the intentional killing of civilians by the Israeli Defense Forces. He stated the "intentional killing of civilians, detainees, and others who are hors de combat is a war crime." A spokesperson for the U.N. High Commissioner for Human Rights described the discoveries, stating, "Some of them had their hands tied, which of course indicates serious violations of international human rights law and international humanitarian law, and these need to be subjected to further investigations". William Schabas, a Canadian expert on international human rights law, stated mass graves have "always been an indication that war crimes have been committed".

=== Assassinations ===
Following the assassination of Ismail Haniyeh, the Iraqi foreign ministry stated the killing was a "flagrant violation of international law and a threat to security and stability in the region".

== Abuse and humiliation of detainees ==
Multiple pieces of video evidence depicting the degrading treatment of Palestinian detainees has surfaced. One of the videos show Israeli soldiers in the occupied West Bank who were dragging and assaulting detainees after surrounding them. Many of the detainees had been stripped naked, having both their arms and feet bound, and beaten with the butts of rifles and trampled. Euro-Mediterranean Human Rights Monitor described this as a "flagrant violation of international laws related to the protection of civilians".

Further video evidence shows Israeli soldiers transporting Palestinians from Ofer Prison, all of whom are blindfolded and stripped completely naked. In another video uploaded by an Israeli soldier, a blindfolded and bound Palestinian is shown kneeling on the ground. The soldier taunts him in Arabic, telling him "صباح الخير يا قحبة" (Good morning, whore) before repeatedly kicking and spitting on him. Human Rights Watch director, Omar Shakir, stated the blindfolding and stripping of Palestinian detainees represented a war crime.

On 20 December 2023, Amnesty International called for an investigation into mass detentions, disappearances, inhumane treatment, and detainee deaths. In February 2024, the BBC published a report detailing documented instances of Israeli soldiers abusing and humiliating Palestinian detainees. According to Mark Ellis, an expert on international criminal tribunals, the report showed possible violations of laws regarding prisoners of war. After the Israeli military dismissed one of the reservists shown in the video, Sir Geoffrey Nice, an expert on war crimes, stated a wider investigation was needed beyond the dismissal. In March 2024, the United Nations stated that Israel had detained and tortured its employees in Gaza, extracting forced confessions. A Bellingcat analysis found instances of a collection of images and videos showing the IDF degrading Palestinian detainees. Queen’s University Belfast war crimes professor Luke Moffett stated these showed potential war crimes. CNN reported of an Israeli military base in the Negev desert that functions as a detention center for Palestinians who are exposed to inhumane treatment. In July 2024, Amnesty International stated Israel needed to end the indefinite detention of Palestinian prisoners without trial, stating it was a "flagrant violation of international law".

=== Sexual violence ===
On February 19, 2024, a group of United Nations special rapporteurs published a report calling for an investigation into violations against Palestinian women and girls in Gaza and the West Bank by Israeli forces. The report presented evidence of wartime sexual violence committed against them during the Gaza conflict, detailing how they endured inhumane treatment by the IDF, including being denied essential items such as menstrual products, food, and medicine. They were also subjected to physical abuse, including severe beatings, sexual assaults, threats of rape, and other forms of sexual violence. In addition, female detainees were stripped and searched by male Israeli soldiers. The UN High Commissioner for Human Rights issued a press release on the same day, stating that Israeli troops had photographed female detainees in “degrading circumstances” and that the photos had been uploaded online. Reem Alsalem, the UN Special Rapporteur on Violence Against Women, criticized that sexual violence against Palestinians is often not reported and investigated. She stated, "Rape and other forms of sexual violence can constitute war crimes, crimes against humanity or a constitutive act with respect to genocide! It must stop!"

Physicians for Human Rights-Israel also described the sexual humiliation of detainees, including sexual insults and urination on prisoners. The Palestinian Prisoner's Society stated men had been subjected to severe sexual assault, including attempted rape and violating strip searches.

In June 2024, a detailed and legally mandated investigative report by the Independent International Commission of Inquiry on the Occupied Palestinian Territory concluded that "The frequency, prevalence and severity of sexual and gender-based crimes perpetrated against Palestinians since 7 October across the Occupied Palestinian Territories (OPT) indicate that specific forms of Sexual and gender-based violence (SGBV) are part of Israeli Security Forces (ISF) operating procedures."

A June 2024 investigation by The New York Times detailed reports that Israeli interrogators at the Sde Teiman detention camp inserted hot metal sticks into detainees' anuses. One detainee reportedly died from the resulting injuries. An April 2024 Haaretz investigation found that prisoners in Ktzi'ot Prison were routinely stripped and humiliated, and they were also deliberately struck in the testicles while undergoing naked checks with a metal detector. In August 2024, a video emerged from the same detention camp depicting the gang rape of a prisoner. At the same time, Ibrahim Salem, who appeared in one of the first leaked photos from Sde Teiman, was released after being held there for 52 days without charge. He reported widespread torture, including by medical staff, as well as electrocution during interrogations, sexual abuse, constant beatings, forced stripping, genital grabbing, and frequent occurrences of rape committed by both male and female soldiers. Children were also subjected to rape. In one instance, a prisoner in his 40s was handcuffed and forced to bend over a desk while a female soldier inserted her fingers and other objects into his rectum. If the prisoner moved, a male soldier positioned in front of him would beat him and compel him to remain in that position. According to Salem, "Most of the prisoners will come out with rectal injuries [caused by the sexual assault]." In an interview with CNN, Salem stated that Palestinians were transported "like animals" to Israeli prisons on trucks, and described being hit in the genitals with metal detectors, as well as raped with a baton.

Save the Children reported receiving credible reports of sexual violence from children who had been detained by the IDF.

In March 2025, the UN Human Rights Commission published a report on sexual and gender-based abuses perpetrated by Israel against the Palestinian people, which concluded that sexual abuse of Palestinians is "committed either under explicit orders or with implicit encouragement by Israel's top civilian and military leadership."

== Destruction of religious, cultural and historic sites ==
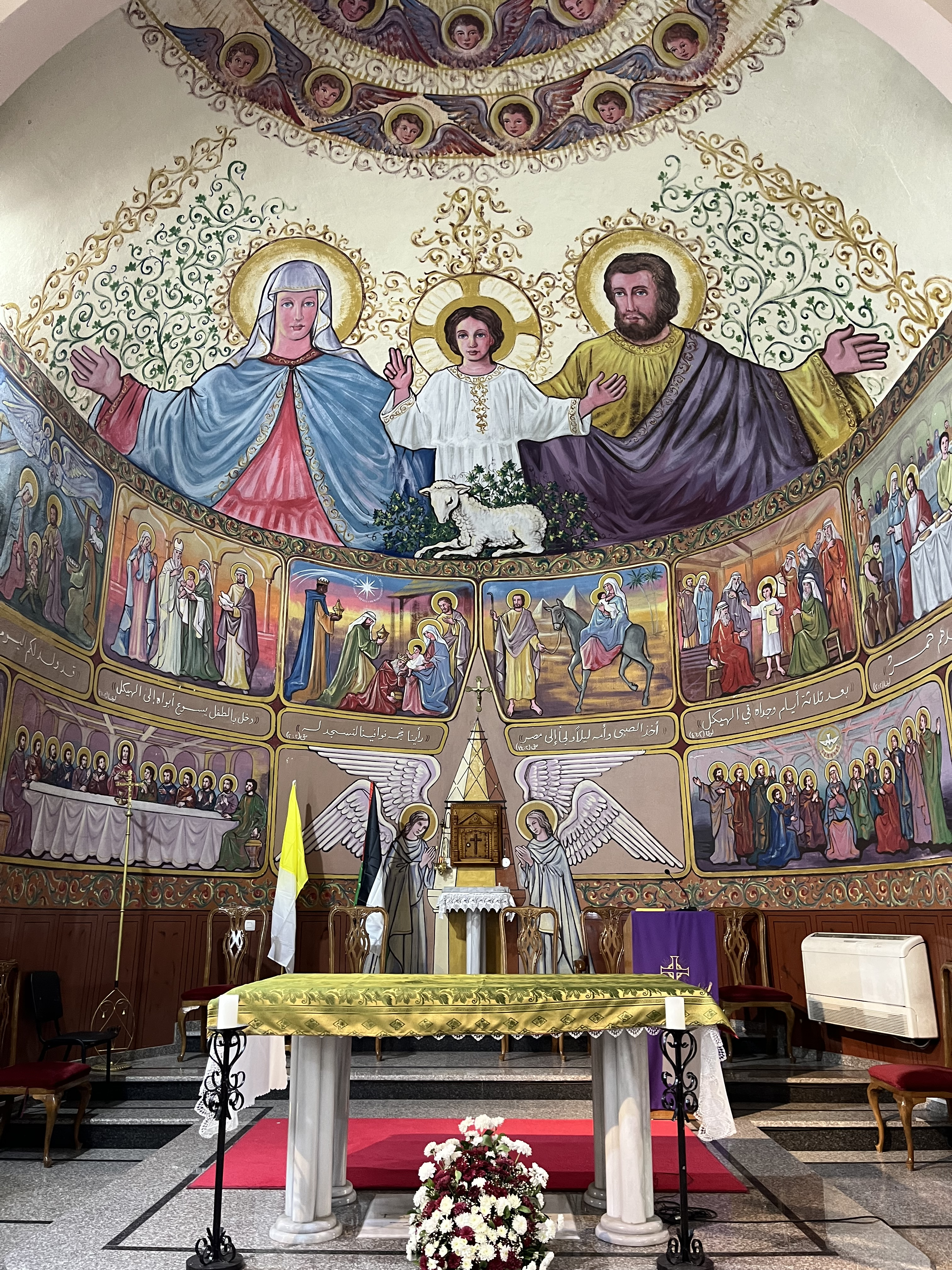
The Holy Family Church, one of the buildings damaged by Israel.

A report in early November 2023 listed over 100 significant cultural heritage sites with religious, cultural and historical importance that Israel had partly or completely destroyed.

In January 2024, the BBC has verified 74 cases where religious sites were damaged or destroyed, of which 72 were mosques and two were churches. In October 2024, the Palestinian Authority's Ministry of Awqaf and Religious Affairs in Gaza estimated that 814 mosques and three churches were destroyed since the war started and a further 148 mosques damaged with the repair costs of over 350 million dollars.

The Nation wrote that the destruction of the Great Omari Mosque in particular, originally a fifth-century Byzantine church, was "a crime against cultural heritage. But more importantly... part of a campaign of total annihilation... a deliberate element of the Israeli campaign to erase all traces of Palestinian life.".

=== Destruction of cemeteries ===
Map of the 12 northernmost cemeteries that Israel has damaged or destroyed in the Gaza Strip so far during the war.
*approximate location

Israel has damaged or destroyed at least 19 cemeteries across the Gaza Strip, in some cases, creating dirt roads across them or establishing military positions.

The intentional destruction of religious sites without military necessity is a possible war crime. The Ministry of Awqaf and Religious Affairs in Gaza stated that the Israeli military was guilty of desecrating graves, exhuming bodies and committing acts of violence against those who died, such as stealing their remains and mutilating them.

On 21 December, bulldozers destroyed a cemetery in the Al-Saha neighborhood in eastern Gaza. On 6 January 2024, Palestinians in Tuffah reburied bodies after the Israeli army reportedly exhumed them and smashed their graves. Gazans in Khan Younis reported the Israeli army raided a cemetery and took corpses. The Khan Younis cemetery was reportedly bulldozed over, tombstones crushed, and the human remains were visible. Muna Haddad, a human rights lawyer, stated, "What is happening is... considered a war crime of 'committing outrages upon personal dignity' under the Rome Statute." On 27 January 2024, Israeli forces escorted CNN into Gaza in an attempt to explain the destruction of Bani Suheila cemetery. According to the IDF a tunnel ran through the cemetery, but during the three hour visit, Israeli commanders failed to prove their claim. Moreover, the IDF did not allow CNN to see any alleged entrance to the tunnel inside the cemetery, and later provided drone footage of two tunnel entrances, both located outside the cemetery. CNN broadcast footage of completely destroyed, and dug-up cemetery grounds.

On 3 of October 2024, the Israeli air force bombed and destroyed a cemetery in Lebanon's Bashoura neighbourhood.

== Collective punishment ==
It is an entire nation out there that is responsible. It is not true this rhetoric about civilians not being aware, not involved. It's absolutely not true. They could have risen up. They could have fought against that evil regime which took over Gaza in a coup d'etat.

— Isaac Herzog

Collective punishment refers to punishing a whole group of people for an act committed by some of its members. Such punishment targets innocent people along with those who can be held responsible for the punished act. In the Gaza war this refers to punishing all Palestinian civilians in Gaza for crimes committed by a number of Hamas militants. Collective punishment constitutes a war crime prohibited by treaty in both international and non-international armed conflicts.

Several actions taken by the Israeli army, including its blockade on electricity, food, fuel and water, were characterized as collective punishment, therefore a war crime. Israel's president Isaac Herzog accused the residents of Gaza of collective responsibility for the war. (Note: The Financial Times later silently deleted Herzog's quote from its article, cf. archive copy of the article from the evening of 13 October.) Doctors Without Borders international president Christos Christou said millions of civilians in Gaza faced "collective punishment" due to Israel's blockade on fuel and medicine.

In an interview with The New Yorker, human rights expert Sari Bashi noted the historical uniqueness of Israeli officials openly admitting they are engaging in collective punishment. On 18 October, UN Secretary-General António Guterres stated Hamas' attacks "cannot justify the collective punishment of the Palestinian people." On 24 October, Human Rights Watch criticized Israel's refusal to allow fuel or water into a Gaza, terming it a war crime. On 29 October, Karim Ahmad Khan stated Israel's impeding aid to Gaza may constitute a crime under the International Criminal Court. On 7 December, Khan again stated "wilfully impeding relief supplies" may constitute a war crime under the Rome Statute. On 20 January 2024, the IDF dropped leaflets with hostages' images on Rafah, stating, "Do you want to return home? Please make the call if you recognise one of them." On 25 January 2024, the Gaza Health Ministry reported that Israeli troops had fired upon and killed twenty civilians seeking humanitarian aid in Gaza City.

On 31 January 2024, Haaretz reported that Israeli army commanders were ordering troops to burn down and destroy unoccupied buildings in Gaza. According to Human Rights Watch: "Unlawful and wanton excessive destruction of property that is not militarily justified, is also a war crime." On 16 April 2024, a spokesperson for the UN Human Rights Office stated, "Israel continues to impose unlawful restrictions on the entry and distribution of humanitarian assistance, and to carry out widespread destruction of civilian infrastructure". The Irish foreign minister Micheál Martin called Israel's actions "fully disproportionate and... a breach of humanitarian law in terms of the destruction of Gaza".

=== Water access ===
As part of Israel's blockade on Gaza, water supplies from Israel were cut off. Article 51 of the Berlin Rules on Water Resources bars combatants from removing water or water infrastructure to cause death or force its movement. The EU's chief diplomat Josep Borrell called Israel's cutting off water, electricity and food as "not in accordance with international law". On 14 October, the UNRWA announced Gaza no longer had clean drinking water, and two million people were at risk of death from dehydration. On 15 October, Israel announced it had resumed supplying water to a single location in southern Gaza to "encourage" movement. Aid workers in Gaza refuted water was available. By 16 October, civilians drank seawater and water contaminated with sewage to survive. In July 2024, Oxfam published a report titled Water War Crimes in which it started that Israel was "systematically weaponizing water against Palestinians" in violation of international law.

=== Starvation ===
Israel imposed a "complete siege" on Gaza in the first ten days of the war, due to alleged security concerns that weapons, fuel, and armaments would be transferred to Hamas in the guise of humanitarian aid. Israel later allowed the delivery of limited humanitarian aid following security checks. Israel's restriction of the flow of food, fuel, water, and other humanitarian aid was criticized as a war crime by human rights organizations and termed a "targeted starvation campaign" by United Nations rights experts.

Tom Dannenbaum, co-director of the Center for International Law & Governance at the Fletcher School at Tufts University, wrote that the order "commands the starvation of civilians as a method of warfare, which is a violation of international humanitarian law and a war crime". Oxfam issued a statement that accused Israel of using starvation as a weapon of war, saying "International Humanitarian Law (IHL) strictly prohibits the use of starvation as a method of warfare and as the occupying power in Gaza, Israel is bound by IHL obligations to provide for the needs and protection of the population of Gaza". Oxfam further stated that attacks on civilian infrastructure were part of the crime of using starvation as a weapon of war.

Geoffrey S. Corn, Chair of Criminal Law and Director of the Center for Military Law and Policy at Texas Tech University School of Law, and Sean Watts, professor in the Department of Law at the United States Military Academy at West Point, write that sieges are subject to the same laws of war as other military tactics such as distinction and proportionality. Watts previously wrote that Article 23 of the Fourth Geneva Convention "requires that parties to a conflict allow passage of a limited class of relief supplies for civilians...only if the parties are satisfied no advantage will result 'to the military efforts or economy of the enemy'", but that if the law is interpreted to allow "incidental" starvation of civilians proportionate to anticipated military advantage, it "reduces the rule's humanitarian effect, perhaps to the vanishing point".

In March 2024, the European Union's top diplomat, Josep Borrell, stated Israel was using starvation as a weapon of war. Similarly, the U.N. High Commissioner for Human Rights, Volker Türk, stated, "The extent of Israel’s continued restrictions on entry of aid into Gaza, together with the manner in which it continues to conduct hostilities, may amount to the use of starvation as a method of war, which is a war crime".

Human Rights Watch stated Israel was committing a war crime by using starvation as a method of warfare. Alex de Waal stated it was the worst man-made famine in 75 years. Luis Moreno Ocampo, the former chief prosecutor for the ICC, stated, "Stopping aid in particular to destroy civilian life – with intention to destroy a historical community – is genocide." In April 2024, the United Nations human rights office stated Israel was placing "unlawful restrictions" on humanitarian aid.

EuroMed Monitor described the situation as a war of starvation against civilians in the Gaza Strip. EuroMed noted living conditions had reached catastrophic levels by Israel cutting off all food supplies to the Northern half, and bombing and destroying factories, bakeries, food stores, water stations, and tanks throughout the entire enclave. EuroMed additionally noted Israel deliberately focused its attacks on targeting electrical generators and solar energy units, on which commercial facilities and restaurants depend, to maintain the minimum possible level of their work. Israel also targeted the agricultural areas east of Gaza, flour stores, and fishermen's boats, as well as relief organizations' centers, including those belonging to the UNRWA. As a result, over 90% of the children in Gaza suffered from varying health issues, including malnutrition, anemia, and weakened immunity. Israeli snipers reportedly targeted people waiting for humanitarian aid.

The ICJ ruled as part of the interim measures that Israel facilitate the flow of aid and lessen humanitarian suffering in Gaza. In its March 2024 interim ruling, the ICJ stated, "The court observes that Palestinians in Gaza are no longer facing only a risk of famine ... but that famine is setting in."

Aid groups complain about the level of aid, blaming harsh war conditions, strict inspections and limits on the number of crossing points while Israel says that the restrictions are necessary to ensure that weapons and supplies do not fall into the hands of Hamas. Three reports, a leaked internal State Department memorandum, an internal assessment by the U.S. Agency for International Development (USAID), and the report of the Independent Task Force on the Application of National Security Memorandum-20 to Israel, confirm that Israel's blocking of humanitarian aid has triggered the legal requirement to halt military aid. A report from Refugees International revealed that Israeli authorities have "erected unnecessary hurdles, complicated logistical processes, and an unpredictable vetting system, rendering the inspection regime overwhelmingly burdensome with layers of bureaucracy and inspection and limited working hours". Israeli professor Neve Gordon wrote of Israel’s history of restricting food access in the Gaza Strip "controlling and managing the population through food insecurity." The UN and Human Rights Watch said the Israeli government is using starvation of civilians as a method of warfare in the Gaza Strip, a war crime.

=== Crop destruction ===
As of summer 2024, over 60% of Gaza's farmland had been damaged or destroyed. Crop destruction is considered a war crime under the Geneva conventions article 54. By November 2024 over 70% of farmland had been hit and over 90% of cattle, killed. 52.5% of agricultural wells and 44.3% of greenhouses have also been damaged.

=== Violations of medical neutrality ===
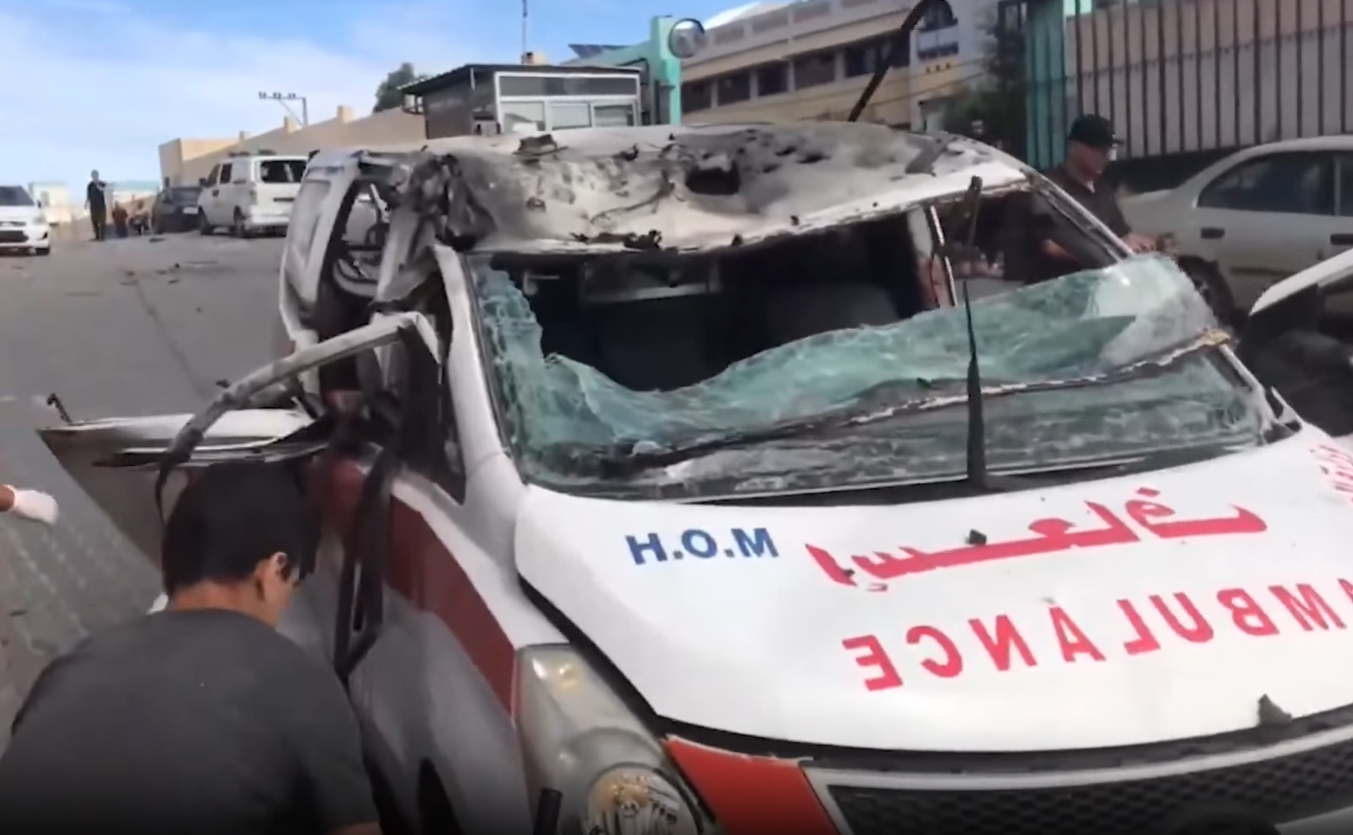
Palestine Red Crescent ambulance destroyed by an Israeli airstrike

Israel is alleged to have broken medical neutrality, a war crime under the Geneva Conventions as hospitals are given special protection under international humanitarian law. These attacks have been carried out in a manner that aid groups and international bodies are increasingly referring to as systematic. According to Gaza officials, the IDF deliberately targeted ambulances and health facilities with airstrikes. In a statement, the Palestine Red Crescent demanded "accountability for this war crime". The International Federation of Red Cross and Red Crescent Societies, UNRWA, and Medecins Sans Frontieres reported the deaths of their medical personnel. On 14 October, the World Health Organization said the killing of health care workers and the destruction of health facilities "denies civilians the basic human right of life-saving health" and is prohibited by International Humanitarian Law. On 17 October, WHO stated 51 health facilities had been attacked by Israel. On 4 November, the Gaza Health Ministry stated 105 medical facilities had been deliberately targeted.

On 21 October, the Ministry of Health noted Israel had attacked 69 health facilities, 24 ambulances, put 7 hospitals out of commission, and killed 37 medical staff. Health workers and aid groups said several hospitals in Gaza were hit by airstrikes and shelling. The Palestine Red Crescent Society accused Israel of "deliberately" carrying out airstrikes "directly around" Gaza's second-largest hospital, al-Quds Hospital, in north Gaza, to force them to evacuate the facility. The World Health Organization (WHO) found it impossible to evacuate the hospital. According to CNN, even those who evacuated south have not been safe. On 30 October 2023, a Turkish-Palestinian Friendship Hospital, located in the south of Gaza, was struck by a "direct hit", causing damage and injuries.

On 3 November, an Israeli airstrike hit an ambulance convoy departing from al-Shifa Hospital carrying, according to a Palestinian Health Ministry spokesman, 15-20 critically injured patients. The Israeli military confirmed the strike, saying one of the ambulances was being used by a "Hamas terrorist cell", and was close to their position. In response, Yanis Varoufakis noted, "Even if the ambulance was carrying a Hamas overlord, bombing it violates the Geneva Convention." UN chief António Guterres stated he was "horrified" by the attack. In prior weeks, Israel had released an animated video stating Al-Shifa hospital contained a hidden, top-secret underground military center. This was flatly denied, with Hamas stating Israel was using "prefabricated" evidence to pre-empt a military strike on a hospital. Laws of war provide limited protections to medical facilities used in such capacities. HRW stated the strikes were apparently unlawful and should be investigated as a possible war crime.

During the Siege of Gaza City, Israeli snipers reportedly fired on the intensive care unit in Al-Quds Hospital, killing one person and wounding 28. Doctors in Al-Shifa Hospital reported snipers at the outskirts of the complex were firing at "any moving person". Fabrizio Carbone, the Middle East regional head of the International Committee of the Red Cross, stated Israel's attacks on al-Shifa Hospital could not continue, stressing patients and hospital staff should be "protected in line with the laws of war". In response to the Al-Shifa Hospital siege, Human Rights Watch stated Israel's actions against hospitals need to be investigated as war crimes. Jennifer Cassidy, a legal expert at University of Oxford, stated Israel's siege on al-Shifa was a war crime "plain and simple". Following an Israeli attack on Indonesia Hospital, the Indonesian Foreign Minister called it a clear violation of international humanitarian law.

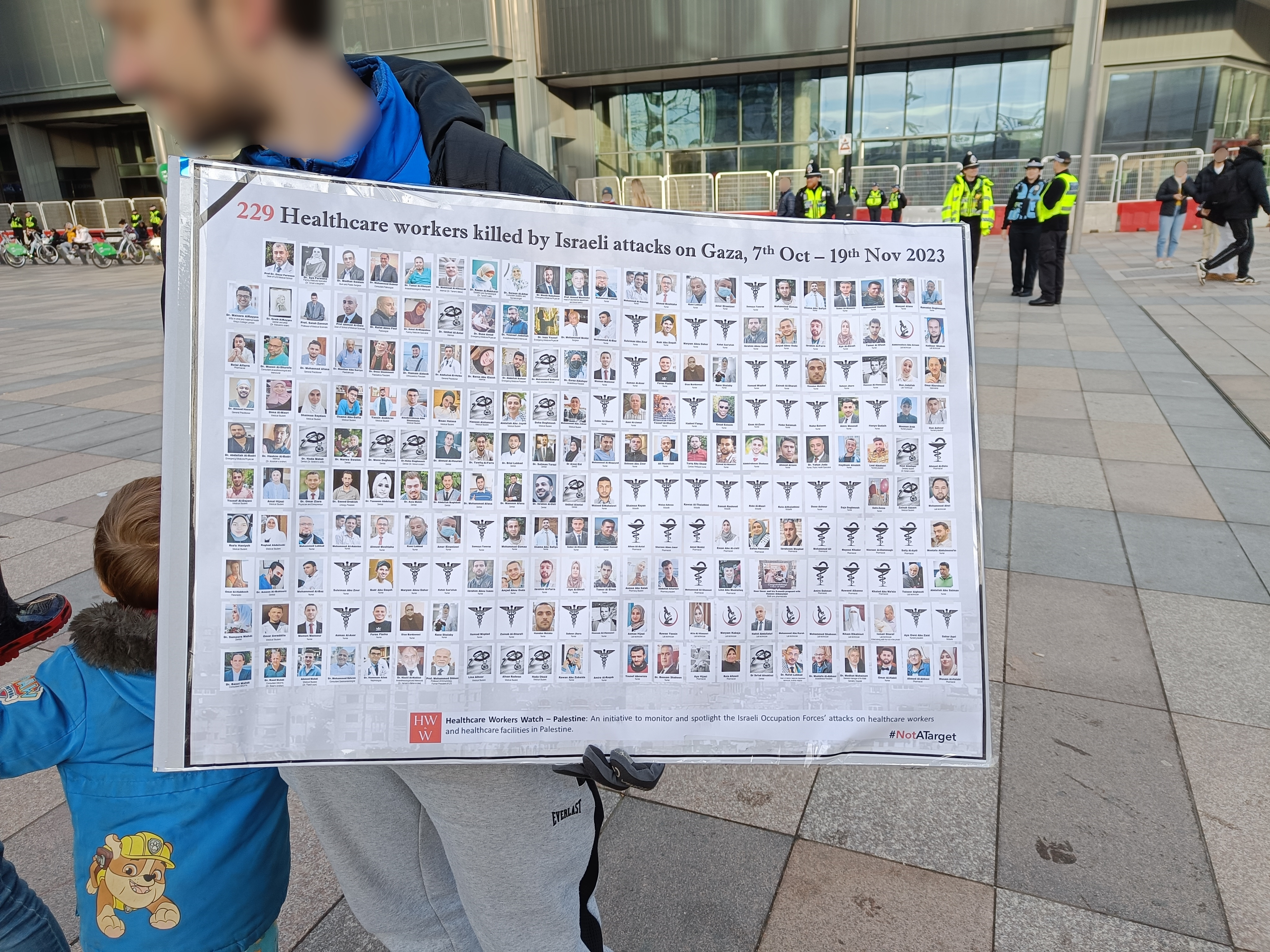
Photos of Palestinian healthcare workers killed during fighting in Gaza, 25 November 2023

On 18 November 2023, two people were killed while traveling in a clearly identified Doctors Without Borders evacuation convoy in Gaza City. Doctors Without Borders termed it a "deliberate attack." On 16 December, the Euro-Mediterranean Human Rights Monitor called for an international investigation into Israeli war crimes at the Kamal Adwan Hospital. On 17 January 2024, Israeli fire damaged the Jordanian field hospital, leading the Jordanian army to call it a "flagrant breach of international law". On 19 January, Jordan stated Israel had "deliberately" targeted the hospital. The World Health Organization stated on 24 January it had recorded 660 Israel attacks on healthcare facilities, calling them "a flagrant violation of international humanitarian law". On 31 January, Doctors Without Borders stated Israel had conducted "systematic attacks on health facilities" which they stated was unprecedented for their organization.

On 8 February 2024, the Palestinian Red Crescent accused the IDF of deliberately killing one of their paramedics. On 11 February, the Red Crescent accused the IDF of deliberately targeting and killing two of their paramedics sent to rescue Hind Rajab, calling the killing a war crime. In response to an Israeli attack at the Al-Aqsa Hospital on 31 March 2024, WHO chief Tedros Adhanom Ghebreyesus stated, "The ongoing attacks and militarisation of hospitals must stop. International humanitarian law must be respected." In May 2024, the Palestinian Red Crescent stated an Israeli attack on their ambulances near Rafah was a war crime. Following the attack, WHO stated, "Health workers are protected under international humanitarian law". In June 2024, the UN Human Rights Office discussed the killing of health workers in Gaza, stating, "These killings have occurred against the backdrop of systematic attacks on hospitals and other medical facilities in violation of the laws of war". In July 2024, the government of Turkey stated that images showing Israel using the Turkish-Palestinian Friendship Hospital as a military base indicated violations of international humanitarian law and threatened to take Israel to court.

In October 2024, a UN inquiry accused Israel of committing serious violations of international law during the conflict, including attacks on medical personnel and facilities. The inquiry alleged that Israeli actions contributed to the collapse of Gaza's healthcare system, citing restrictions on medical evaluations and damage to healthcare infrastructure.

==== Rafah humanitarian convoy attacks ====
In March 2025, the United Nations said that Israeli troops killed 15 Palestinian aid workers in southern Gaza and buried them in a mass grave. On March 23, the PRCS said it lost contact with an ambulance sent to the scene of an Israeli airstrike. A convoy sent to retrieve the medics subsequently went missing as well. The IDF claimed that it fired on "suspicious vehicles" that were driving with their lights off. However, video taken by one of the men killed by Israel showed clearly marked ambulances driving with both headlights and flashing emergency lights. The U.N. said that it was prevented from accessing the site where the medics went missing for several days. On March 29, one of the bodies was found and 14 more were recovered the next day, buried alongside their emergency vehicles. According to eyewitness accounts, some of the bodies were found with their hands or legs tied and appeared to have been shot in the head. According to an OCHA spokesperson, "The available information indicates that the first team was killed by Israeli forces on 23 March, and that other emergency and aid crews were struck one after another over several hours as they searched for their missing colleagues." The Gaza health ministry claimed, "They were executed, some of them handcuffed and had sustained head and chest injuries. They were buried in a deep hole to prevent their identities from being identified."

=== Protected status ===
Israel alleges medical facilities are used to store weapons and have been used as a base of fire, and that hospitals' special protection is lost if that is the case. However, the IDF has not presented hard evidence to support their claims. Israel also does not have the power to unilaterally decide if a hospital has lost protected status. According to International Criminal Court prosecutor Karim Khan, the bar for evidence that a hospital, school, or place of worship is being used for military purposes is very high. The burden of proof also lays with the Israelis. Jessica Wolfendale, an expert in military ethics at Case Western Reserve University, stated that even if Israel had been able to prove Shifa concealed a military operation, international law remains in place, as, "Steps need to be taken to protect the innocent." A hospital attack is also still illegal under international law if it harms civilians disproportionately to the military objective.

Ardi Imseis, an international law expert at Queen's University at Kingston, stated, "Until such time that the Israelis provide proof that it has been converted into a military object, the civilian nature of the object does not change." Human Rights Watch stated, "The Israeli government has put forward no evidence that would justify stripping hospitals of their special protections." The OHCHR stated, "Even if Israel contends that a medical facility has lost its protection... it must nevertheless comply with the principles of precautions and proportionality."

== Targeting of journalists ==
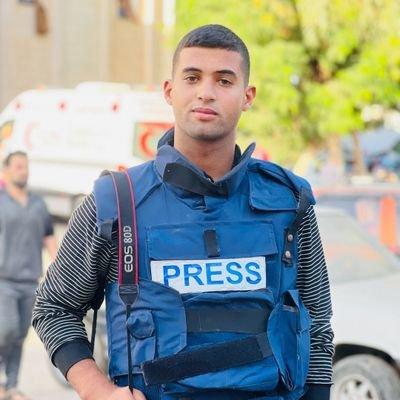
Al Jazeera's Gaza correspondent Hossam Shabat was assassinated by Israel on 24 March 2025

On 1 November 2023, Reporters Without Borders (RSF) asked the International Criminal Court (ICC) to begin a priority war crimes investigation into the killing of nine journalists. RSF noted that of the 41 journalists killed in the first month of the conflict, 36 among them were Palestinian reporters killed by Israeli strikes in the Gaza Strip.

Jodie Ginsberg, the president of the Committee to Protect Journalists, called for an ICC investigation into the killing of journalists in Gaza, stating the killings "appear to have been targeted". On 27 January 2024, the International Federation of Journalists wrote an open-letter to Benjamin Netanyahu and Yoav Gallant stating they would take Israel to court if it did not comply with the International Court of Justice (ICJ) order to avoid targeting journalists. In February 2024, the deputy director of the International Federation of Journalists stated, "There appears to have been a systematic campaign to kill and terrify and maim journalists in Gaza".

On 13 February 2024, Al Jazeera stated Israel had attacked two of its journalists in Gaza. They called it "a full-fledged crime added to Israel's crimes against journalists, and a new part in the series of the deliberate targeting of Al Jazeera's journalists". A representative from Media Defence stated, "Journalists are civilians so they are entitled to all the protections that civilians should have in times of conflict". The director of the International Press Institute stated, "We see journalists clearly targeted… Our organisation has been monitoring press freedom for almost 75 years and this is the worst attack we have seen on journalists in any conflict".

Following the Israeli killing of Samer Abu Daqqa, Al Jazeera stated it was referring the incident to the ICC. In June 2024, a Forbidden Stories investigation into Israel's killing of journalists suggested that some of the killings were deliberate. The investigation further found that Israeli tanks were likely responsible for an attack on the Agence France Press building in Gaza, described by investigators as "likely targeted". In September 2024, RSF stated there were 31 credible cases where journalists were directly targeted by the Israeli army.

=== Killing of Issam Abdallah ===
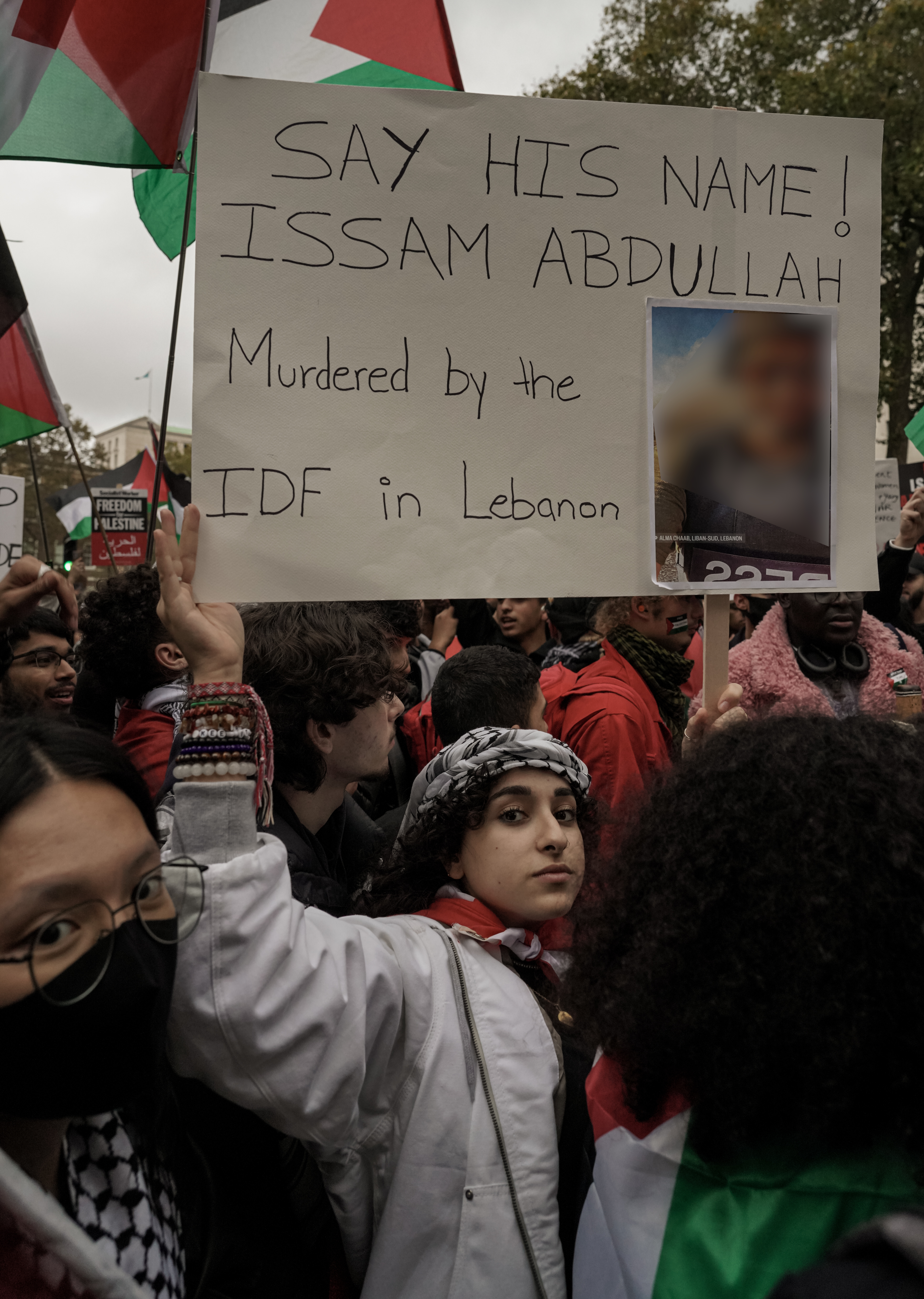
A protestor holding up a sign of Issam Abdallah during mass demonstrations in London, 29 October 2023

RSF conducted a preliminary investigation into the killing of Issam Abdallah, a Reuters photojournalist killed in Lebanon. They found that the strike on a clearly marked vehicle marked "Press" was purposely targeted and that the fire had come from Israel. An investigation by the Agence France Press found Abdallah's killing was used with tank shells of Israeli origin and were deliberate and targeted. Amnesty International stated the attack was a likely war crime and that "Israel must not be allowed to kill and attack journalists with impunity." Human Rights Watch stated the attack was apparently deliberate and constitutes a war crime. A study by the Netherlands Organisation for Applied Scientific Research found it likely "that a Merkava tank, after firing two tank rounds, also used its machine gun against the location of the journalists".

A February 2024 report by the United Nations Interim Force in Lebanon concluded that an Israeli tank killed Abadallah when it fired at "clearly identifiable journalists", and that this broke international law. The report "assessed that there was no exchange of fire across the Blue Line at the time of the incident", with no records of any exchange of fire across the border for the 40 minutes before the tank firing. The Israel Defense Forces responded to the United Nations report by claiming that Hezbollah attacked them, so tank fire was used to retaliate. The report concluded that the attack was a violation of UNSCR 1701 and international law.

== Forced evacuation ==
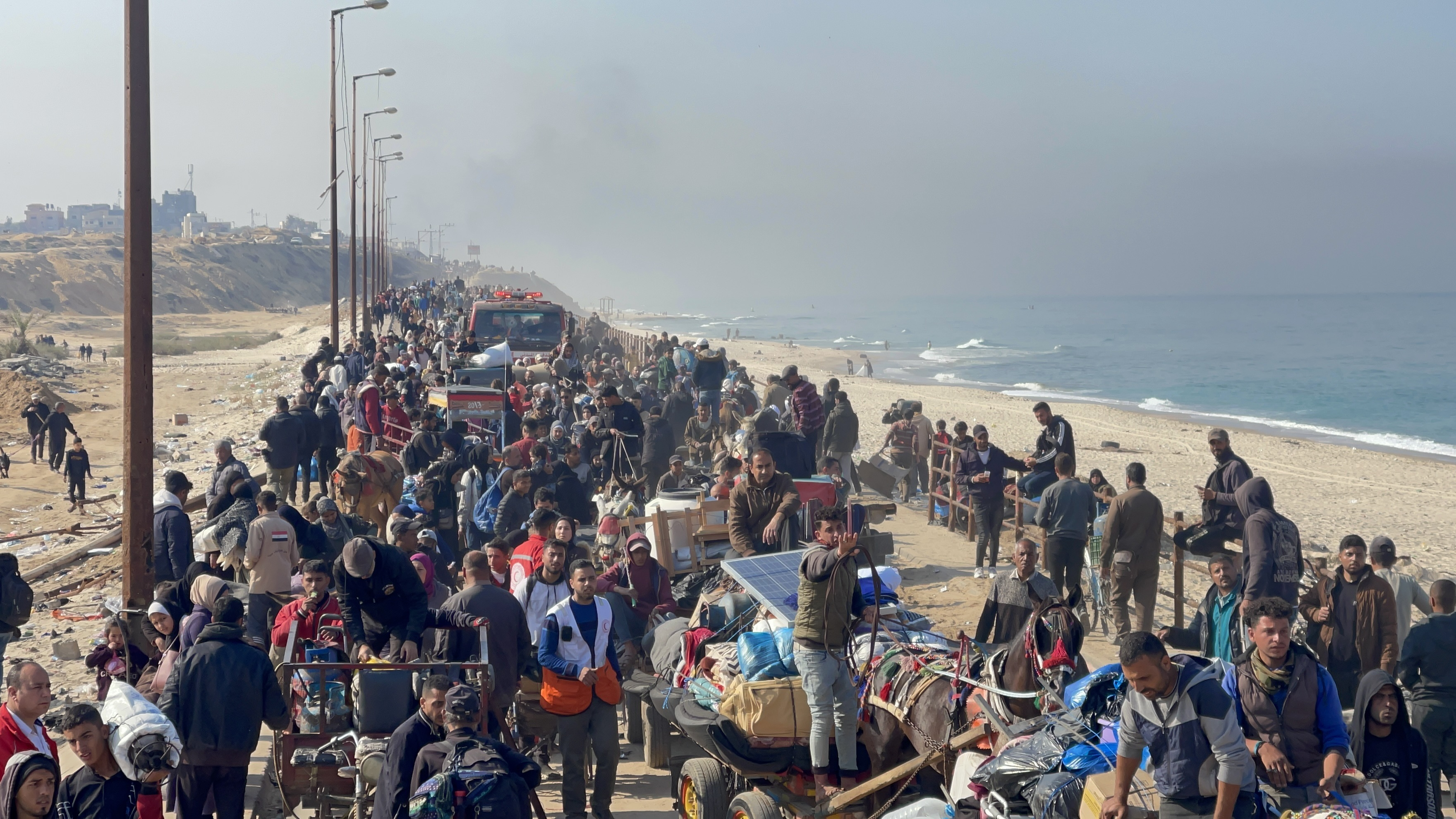
Return of displaced Palestinians from the south to the northern Gaza Strip during the ceasefire in January 2025

On 13 October, the Israeli army ordered the evacuation of 1.1 million people from north Gaza, saying that they needed to separate the civilian population from the militants embedded among them, and that the population would be allowed to return after the war. Gazan officials initially asked residents to ignore the order, with the Interior Ministry stating Israel sought to "displace us once again from our land". The evacuation was characterized as a forcible transfer by Jan Egeland, a Norwegian diplomat involved with the Oslo Accord. Egeland stated, "There are hundreds of thousands of people fleeing for their life — [that is] not something that should be called an evacuation. It is a forcible transfer of people from all of northern Gaza, which according to the Geneva Convention is a war crime." UN Special rapporteur Francesca Albanese warned of a mass ethnic cleansing in Gaza. Israeli historian Raz Segal termed it a "textbook case of genocide." The action was condemned by the UN, Doctors Without Borders, UNICEF, and the IRC.

On 14 October, the World Health Organization issued a statement condemning Israel's order to evacuate 22 hospitals in northern Gaza, calling it a "death sentence". Doctors noted both the southern Gaza Strip's lack of hospital beds and the impossibility of transporting patients, such as newborns in incubators and patients on ventilators. Nevertheless, on 22 October, the IDF dropped leaflets in northern Gaza stating anyone who did not comply with the evacuation would be considered a "terrorist". On 20 December, Human Rights Watch stated the risk of forced displacement was growing. On 12 January, the Assistant Secretary General for Human Rights stated that Israel's compelled evacuations had failed to ensure protections required under international law, thus constituting a potential war crime. In March 2024, Forensic Architecture stated that Israel's "humanitarian evacuations" might amount to the war crime of forced displacement.

In March 2024, Paula Gaviria Betancur, the UN Special Rapporteur on the rights of internally displaced persons, stated ahead of Israel's planned Rafah offensive: "Any evacuation order imposed on Rafah under the current circumstances, with the rest of Gaza reduced to rubble, would be a flagrant violation of international humanitarian and human rights law." French president Emmanuel Macron told Netanyahu that a forced transfer of the population from Rafah would be a war crime. In May 2024, Volker Türk condemned Israel's evacuation orders in Rafah, stating, "This is inhumane. It runs contrary to the basic principles of international humanitarian and human rights laws". A UNOCHA spokesperson said of the Rafah evacuation: "There are strong indications that this is being conducted in violation of international humanitarian law".

== Buffer zone ==
Israel sought to create an expanded buffer zone in Gaza. Satellite analysis by researchers at Hebrew University found the buffer zone was already in advanced stages. By January 2024, Israel had destroyed more than 1,000 buildings for the planned zone. In April 2024, UNOSAT found that around 90 percent of the 4,000 buildings on Gaza's eastern border had been damaged or destroyed. The Palestinian Center for Human Rights stated such civilian properties were protected under international humanitarian law. Shaul Arieli, a former IDF colonel and expert on Israeli borders, stated that the creation of a permanent buffer zone was illegal, since Israel is prohibited from altering the boundaries of Gaza as an occupying power. Geoffrey Nice, a war crimes prosecutor, stated, "It is unjustified, by any view, under international law." Volker Türk, the UN human rights chief, stated, "Extensive destruction of property, not justified by military necessity and carried out unlawfully and wantonly, amounts to a grave breach of the Fourth Geneva Convention, and a war crime." An analysis by Haaretz found the buffer zone could occupy as much as 16 percent of Gaza's overall territory. A May 2024 Al Jazeera investigation found the buffer zone had taken 32 percent of Gaza's territory.

== Looting ==
During the war, soldiers looted Palestinian homes in Gaza, reportedly taking "whatever is easy and accessible". On 21 February 2024, Yifat Tomer-Yerushalmi, the IDF's Military Advocate General, stated that some soldiers' actions — including looting and the removal of private property — had "crossed the criminal threshold". Tomer-Yerushalmi stated such cases were under investigation. The Council on American-Islamic Relations called the looting a war crime and demanded the Biden administration to condemn them. The Fourth Geneva Convention of 1949 explicitly prohibits the looting of civilian property during wartime. In August 2024, Yuval Green, an IDF paratrooper returning from Gaza, stated he had witnessed widespread abuses against Palestinians in Gaza, including looting and the destruction of homes.

== Additional theaters of war ==
=== Yemen ===
In July 2024, Israel bombed the Hodeidah port during its conflict with the Houthis. Human Rights Watch termed the strikes a possible war crime, as they appeared to be an indiscriminate or disproportionate attack on civilians.

=== Lebanon ===
In September 2024, thousands of wireless communication devices exploded throughout Lebanon and Syria in an attack attributed to Israel, killing dozens of people, including civilians and Hezbollah militants. Lama Fakih, a director of the Human Rights Watch, said that the explosions would constitute an indiscriminate attack if the IDF had no way of accurately determining the location of the explosive devices since there would be no distinction between civilians and military targets. UN High Commissioner for Human Rights Volker Türk said that the attacks violated international human rights since the IDF did not have knowledge regarding the users of the devices or their location and surroundings during the explosions. According to the Syrian Observatory for Human rights, 232 Syrian refugees were killed by the IDF in Lebanon since the start of the Gaza war.

According to the Syrian Observatory for Human rights, 232 Syrian refugees were killed by the IDF in Lebanon since the start of the Israel-Hamas war.

=== West Bank ===
During the war, the Israeli military was increasingly active in the West Bank. According to Amnesty International, Israel violated international humanitarian law by using disproportionate force during arrest raids, blocking medical assistance to people with life-threatening injuries, attacking paramedics, and conducting unlawful killings. Erika Guevara Rosas, Amnesty's director of global research, stated, "These unlawful killings are in blatant violation of international human rights law and are committed with impunity". Ben Saul, UN special rapporteur on human rights, stated that a November 2023 IDF killing of two boys appeared to be a war crime. On 5 March 2024, the Palestinian Red Crescent stated that it had recorded 427 violations against its medical mission by Israel in the West Bank, terming these a violation of international humanitarian law.

Following the demolition of a Palestinian activist's family home in East Jerusalem — part of a broader wave of forced displacement in the West Bank (Note: On 27 December 2023, UNOCHA stated that since 7 October, 1,208 people had been displaced due settler violence, 393 due to lacking Israeli building permits, 95 on punitive grounds, and 483 due to army demolitions.) — the European Union External Action Service stated, "Such acts are in violation of International Humanitarian Law". George Noll, head of the U.S. Office of Palestinian Affairs, condemned the demolition. Following the Israeli approval of around 3,500 new illegal settlements in the West Bank, UN human rights chief Volker Türk stated the transfer of Israel's population into the occupied territories was a "war crime under international law". Following the announcement that Israel was seizing 800 hectares of Palestinian land in the West Bank, the Federal Foreign Office stated, "The settlements violate international law and fuel further tensions in this extremely fragile situation." French president Emmanuel Macron condemned the expanded settlements, stating they "are contrary to international law". The UN Human Rights Office stated they were "alarmed" by Israel's expanded settlements and stated they "fly in the face of international law".

BBC News reported in May 2024 that 11 soldiers of the Kfir Brigade (which is primarily active in the West Bank) posted on social media 45 photos and videos showing detained Palestinians; the Israeli Defence Forces did not respond when asked about the individual incidents or individual soldiers involved and identified, instead broadly stating: "In the event of unacceptable behavior, soldiers were disciplined and even suspended from reserve duty." BBC News further reported that the soldiers did not obscure their identities, with some of them posting under names of Yohai Vazana, Ofer Bobrov, Sammy Ben, and Ori Dahbash. According to BBC News, the "detained Palestinians are frequently shown blindfolded and restrained, having been forced to either lie on the floor, or squat, with their hands bound behind their backs", with some detainees being covered in Israeli flags. Jan Egeland, the head of the Norwegian Refugee Council, stated, "The failure to hold Israel accountable has allowed its forces to violate IHL [international humanitarian law] without consequence".

In September 2024, Israeli soldiers pushed three corpses from a rooftop during a raid on Qabatiya.

== Use of white phosphorus on civilians ==
Human Rights Watch and Amnesty International's Crisis Evidence Lab shared evidence that Israeli military units striking in Gaza and Lebanon have employed white phosphorus artillery rounds; Israel denied the report, calling the accusation "unequivocally false", although it has since admitted to its use. White phosphorus munitions are allowed on battlefields for specific purposes such as creating smokescreens, generating illumination, and marking targets. They are not banned as chemical weapons under international conventions due to these legitimate uses. However, white phosphorus is also considered an incendiary weapon, and Protocol III of the Convention on Certain Conventional Weapons prohibits their use against military targets located among civilians, although Israel is not a signatory. White phosphorus ignites when exposed to atmospheric oxygen, and on contact can cause deep and severe injuries, potentially leading to multiple organ failure, and even minor burns can be fatal. According to Human Rights Watch, the use of white phosphorus is "unlawfully indiscriminate when airburst in populated urban areas, where it can burn down houses and cause egregious harm to civilians", and "violates the requirement under international humanitarian law to take all feasible precautions to avoid civilian injury and loss of life". According to Amnesty International weapons investigator Brian Castner, whether employing white phosphorus constitutes a war crime depends on the intended target and intended use, but that "generally, any attacks that fail to discriminate between civilians and military forces can potentially be a violation of the laws of war".

On 31 October 2023, after an investigation, Amnesty International stated that a 16 October Israeli white phosphorus attack was indiscriminate, unlawful, and "must be investigated as a war crime", due to its use on the populated Lebanese town of Dhayra, which injured at least nine civilians. On 2 November, Amnesty International stated its investigations into four incidents on 10, 11, 16 and 17 October showed Israel had used white phosphorus munitions. In Lebanon, Israel's white phosphorus bombs have destroyed over 4.5 million sq m of forest in southern Lebanon with the economic loses being valued at nearly 20 million dollars. An investigation by the Washington Post uncovered that white phosphorus used in an October attack that injured 9 people in Lebanon were supplied by the US.

In June 2024, Human Rights Watch verified the unlawful use of white phosphorus munitions over five populated residential municipalities. According to the Lebanese Health Ministry, at least 173 people have needed medical intervention for white phosphorus exposure. In October 2024, a leaked UN report stated the Israeli military entered a Unifil base and used white phosphorus, injuring 15 peacekeepers.

On 3 March 2026, Human Rights Watch reported that Israeli forces had used white phosphorus munitions over the southern Lebanese village of Yohmor, striking a residential neighborhood. The organisation noted that Israel had previously used white phosphorus in southern Lebanon between October 2023 and May 2024, which it said put civilians at risk.

== Killing of surrendered people ==
=== Surrendered Palestinians ===
On 10 October, the Israeli Defence Force published a video that appeared to show IDF soldiers shooting four surrendering Palestinians. Footage analysis indicated the men appeared to be surrendering, with three men getting on the ground with their arms raised, one waving a piece of white clothing. None of them appeared to be armed at the time of the shooting, while a subsequent video showed the bodies had been moved, with weapons placed near them on the ground. The analysis concluded the four men were unarmed Palestinians who left Gaza through a breach in the separation wall. An IDF spokesman said he had no comment. Killing surrendered civilians or combatants is a war crime.

In video footage dated 8 December 2023, the Israeli military is seen killing two Palestinians from the West Bank's Far'a refugee camp in what B'Tselem described as "illegal executions". One man holding a canister was shot, and was then gunned down while he laid bleeding on the ground. A second man, who was completely unarmed and hiding under a car, was shot and killed instantly. The Israeli military later said they would investigate the attacks.

Human rights groups documented multiple instances of civilians in Gaza being shot by Israeli soldiers while waving white flags. The Human Rights Watch Israel-Palestine director stated Israel had a "track record of unlawfully firing at unarmed people who pose no threat with impunity – even those waving white flags". (Note: The director stated that in prior cases, "There were statements that they would be investigated but no one was held into account".) In early January, a video surfaced dating to 12 November showing displaced Palestinians evacuating Gaza City, including a woman and her child. Despite the group clearly carrying white flags, the woman was reportedly shot and killed by an Israeli sniper.

On 24 January 2024, British network ITV released footage of an Israeli sniper shooting and killing a man carrying a white flag whom the journalist had interviewed only moments before his death. Both the Norwegian Refugee Council and Amnesty International termed it a possible war crime. An IDF senior commander later stated, "There are mistakes, it is war."

According to a witness interviewed by Al Jazeera, the corpses of 30 people were found on 31 January 2024 inside a schoolyard in northern Gaza, with the bodies reportedly blindfolded, and their legs and hands tied. The Council on American-Islamic Relations said the incident should be probed and added to South Africa's ICJ case against Israel. The Palestinian Ministry of Foreign Affairs called it a "violation of all relevant international norms and laws". The Canadian-Palestinian former peace negotiator Diana Buttu stated the incident was "clearly a war crime". In March 2024, a man in Zeitoun was deliberately run over by an Israeli tank while handcuffed, according to the Euro-Med Human Rights Monitor.

Footage obtained by Al Jazeera English showed two men waving white flags being killed by Israeli forces, then buried by army bulldozers. The IDF confirmed the killing of the two men, stating they had been acting in a "suspicious manner" and didn't respond to warning shots; they said they buried them with bulldozers as they feared they were carrying explosives. The Palestine Red Crescent Society condemned Israel's actions as "extrajudicial killings". The Council on American-Islamic Relations called the killings a "heinous war crime".

On 27 November 2025, footage captured by journalists in Jenin showed two men, 26-year-old Al-Muntasir Mahmoud Qassem Abdullah and 37-year-old Youssef Ali Youssef Asasa, shot to death after surrendering themselves to Israeli forces during a "counterterrorism" operation in the city. According to the Palestinian Islamic Jihad (PIJ), both men were fighters for its armed wing, Al-Quds Brigades. According to Palestinian journalist, Nour Odeh, the men "pulled their shirts up, showing that they were unarmed" before the Israeli military told them to return into the building that they were holed up in. The Palestinian Authority accused Israel of committing a "war crime" and described the killings as "brutal field executions". Husam Zomlot, the Palestinian ambassador to the United Kingdom, stated on X, labelled the incident as "summary executions" and said that it was a "war crime part of a pattern across the occupied territory".

=== Surrendered Israeli hostages ===
On 15 December, the IDF released a statement announcing that they had killed three of their own hostages by friendly fire. According to the Israeli military, they "mistakenly identified three Israeli hostages as a threat" during operations in Shuja'iyya and subsequently fired at them, killing them. According to an Israeli military official on 16 December, the three hostages were shirtless and waving a white flag. The official claimed that one soldier responded to this by "open[ing] fire" and "declar[ing] that they're terrorists"; more Israeli forces fired, killing two hostages "immediately" and wounding the third hostage, who appealed for help in Hebrew. The wounded hostage was pursued into a nearby building by IDF soldiers, where he was killed despite continued pleas for help. Though he claimed that the soldiers were "under pressure" when this happened, Lieutenant General Herzi Halevi also stated that "It is forbidden to shoot at someone who raises a white flag and seeks to surrender", a sentiment echoed by the former head of Mossad, Danny Yatom. Nahum Barnea wrote that the killing of the hostages, unarmed and waving a white flag, was a "war crime" and that "international law is very clear on the issue". A preliminary IDF investigation found the soldiers were told to open fire on all fighting-age men who approached them, after a number of incidents where militants disguised themselves as civilians to approach soldiers.

== Perfidy by the IDF ==
=== Israeli forces disguised as civilians ===
On 30 January 2024, Israeli forces entered the Ibn Sina hospital in Jenin disguised as medics and civilians while carrying concealed rifles. After entering the hospital they drew their weapons and killed three militants — one member of Hamas and two members of Palestinian Islamic Jihad — one of whom was a patient. The International Committee of the Red Cross expressed concern that the raid was a violation of international humanitarian law. Aurel Sari, a professor at the University of Exeter, stated, "By disguising themselves as civilians and as medical personnel, the Israeli forces involved in the operation appear to have resorted to perfidy in violation of the applicable rules." Tom Dannenbaum, a professor of international law, stated, "Someone who is paralyzed is incapacitated in that respect, so an attack on that individual would be prohibited. Violating that prohibition would be a war crime." The Palestinian Ministry of Foreign Affairs called the shootings a crime against humanity. The Independent Commission for Human Rights called the attack "an assault on an institution protected by international law". OHCHR stated it was a "seemingly planned extrajudicial execution."

The IDF initially said the raid had been a "joint IDF, ISA, and Israel Police counterterrorism activity", and later said that none of their soldiers were physically present during the raid. A panel of human rights experts appointed by the UN Human Rights Council stated the raid could constitute a war crime and recommended an investigation.

In June 2024, UN experts condemned Israel's use of perfidy during the Nuseirat refugee camp massacre, stating Israeli forces "entered Nuseirat disguised as displaced persons and aid workers in a humanitarian truck. They violently raided the area, assaulting residents with intense ground and air attacks that spread terror, death and despair."

=== Use of human shields ===
On 17 January 2024, Israeli soldiers were recorded using a Palestinian shop-owner in Dura, Hebron, West Bank, as a human shield. In an interview with Reuters, the shop-owner stated, "He (the first soldier) told me that he will use me as a human shield, that young people shouldn't hurl stones." On 9 February, the Palestinian Red Crescent Society stated that an ambulance crew in Beita, Nablus, West Bank had been detained by Israeli forces and used as human shields. A 21-year-old man from Gaza City stated to Al Jazeera that he had been used as a human shield by Israeli forces. In June 2024, Israeli forces tied a wounded man to the front of their jeep, eliciting condemnation for the IDF's use of Palestinian human shields. In July 2024, footage showed Israeli soldiers apparently using Palestinian human shields to enter buildings.

In August 2024, sources stated that Israeli forces were using Palestinians as human shields when they entered tunnels and buildings in Gaza. An investigation found that Israeli regularly used Palestinian human shields in the Gaza Strip to avoid putting Israeli soldiers in danger.

In February 2025, according to a report by Israeli outlet 'the Hottest Place in Hell', in May 2024, an IDF officer used an 80-year-old Palestinian man as a human shield to inspect in Gaza for booby traps, while threatening to blow off his head by tying an IED command-wire to his neck. Later, the elderly man and his wife were shot dead by Israeli forces.

According to Haaretz, an anonymous senior IDF officer revealed that the Israeli army used Palestinians as human shields at least six times per day and stressed that each brigade has at least 36 human shields.

In August 2026, Palestinian journalist, Younis Tirawi, published an image of two Palestinian men, Nadi and Ali Marouf, were executed by Israeli soldiers from the 92nd Battalion of the Kfir Brigade in November 2024 after they were abducted from Beit Lahia and used as human shields for several days.

== Genocide ==
The Gaza genocide is the ongoing, intentional, and systematic destruction of the Palestinian people in the Gaza Strip carried out by Israel during the Gaza war. It encompasses mass killings, including the targeted killing of children (who account for 30% of those killed), deliberate starvation, infliction of serious bodily and mental harm, and prevention of births. Israel maintains a blockade on the Gaza Strip, restricting Gazans' freedom of movement and access to outside aid. The Israel Defense Forces have destroyed civilian infrastructure, including educational, religious, and cultural sites and healthcare facilities, and killed healthcare workers and aid-seekers. Palestinians in Gaza also face forced mass displacement and sexual violence. The genocide has been recognized, in either a legal or scholarly sense, by a United Nations special committee and commission of inquiry, the International Association of Genocide Scholars, multiple human rights groups, (Note: Amnesty International, Médecins Sans Frontières, B'Tselem, Physicians for Human Rights–Israel, International Federation for Human Rights.) state governments, numerous genocide studies and international law scholars, and other experts.

As of October 2026, at least 74,500 people in Gaza had been killed. The vast majority of the victims were civilians, and around 50% were women and children. Compared to other recent global conflicts, the numbers of known deaths of journalists, humanitarian and health workers, and children are among the highest. Thousands more uncounted bodies are thought to be under the rubble of destroyed buildings. A study in the medical journal The Lancet estimated that traumatic injury deaths were undercounted by June 2024, while noting an even larger potential death toll with indirect deaths included. The number of injured is greater than 174,000. Gaza has the most child amputees per capita in the world; the Gaza war caused more than 21,000 children to be disabled. In July 2025, 18,457 children were listed among the war dead by health authorities in Gaza, excluding indirect deaths and those buried under rubble. Several media critics, including Robin Anderson, accused traditional media of underreporting the killing of children in Gaza; of 1,100 articles studied by Adam Johnson, only two had the word "children" in the headline.

An Israeli blockade heavily contributed to starvation and confirmed famine. In August 2025, about 641,000 people experienced catastrophic levels of food insecurity. Early in the conflict, Israel cut off Gaza's water and electricity. It later partially restored the water. As of October 2025, 94% of Gaza's health centres had been destroyed or damaged. Israel also destroyed numerous cultural heritage sites, including all 12 of Gaza's universities, and 80% of its schools. Over 1.9 million Palestinians—85% of Gaza's population—were forcibly displaced. Israel's bombing has also caused severe environmental devastation across the territory.

In December 2023, the government of South Africa instituted proceedings, South Africa v. Israel, against Israel at the International Court of Justice (ICJ), alleging a violation of the Genocide Convention. In January 2024, the court ordered Israel to take all measures within its power to prevent the commission of acts of genocide, to prevent and punish incitement to genocide, and to allow basic humanitarian service, aid and supplies into Gaza. The court later ordered Israel to increase humanitarian aid into Gaza and to halt its Rafah offensive. Israel did not fully comply with the court's orders. Separately, in November 2024, the International Criminal Court (ICC) issued arrest warrants for Benjamin Netanyahu and Yoav Gallant for war crimes and crimes against humanity. (Note: The charges were the war crimes of starvation of civilians as a weapon of war, willfully causing great suffering or serious injury to body or health, willful killing or murder and intentionally directing attacks against a civilian population, as well as extermination and/or murder, persecution and "other inhumane acts" as crimes against humanity.) In response, the United States imposed sanctions on the ICC in February 2025.

Palestinians have emphasized the relationship between the Gaza genocide and Zionist political violence, describing it as a continuation of the Nakba and its ongoing effects. Israel and its supporters maintain that its actions do not constitute genocide, that they are a response to the October 7 attacks, and that Israel's aim has been to destroy Hamas and free Israeli hostages. (Note: All living captives were released by 13 October 2025. The remains of the last remaining captive were recovered on 26 January 2026.) There is increasing consensus among genocide and international legal scholars on the genocide assessment, although some academics and countries challenge it.

== Arms transfers ==
States transferring weapons to Israel faced charges of violations of international law. In February 2024, a group of more than a dozen United Nations special rapporteurs stated that any export of weapons or munitions to Israel was "likely to violate international humanitarian law." The UN experts stated that parties signed to the Arms Trade Treaty have additional obligations to deny arms exports if the weapons could be used for serious violations of international humanitarian law. The group called for an arms embargo. In a statement, Human Rights Watch stated that the United Kingdom's refusal to suspend arms transfer to Israel put it "at risk of failing to prevent and being complicit in serious violations of international law, including war crimes and crimes against humanity". In March 2024, Nicaragua filed a lawsuit at the International Court of Justice against Germany, stating that its financial and military support to Israel was facilitating genocide in Gaza.

Canadian Foreign Minister Melanie Joly was sued by the Canadian Lawyers for International Human Rights group for authorizing the export of weapons used by Israel to violate international law. Soon after, Joly stated the Canadian government was no longer issuing new weapons export licenses to the Israeli military. The Government of Denmark was sued by Oxfam, Amnesty International, Action Aid, and Al-Haq for their arms transfers to Israel, with the organizations stating, "Denmark violates international rules on arms trade and risks becoming complicit in violations of international humanitarian law – including war crimes – and a plausible genocide." In March 2024, Human Rights Watch and Oxfam stated that Israel was committing violations of international humanitarian law with weapons provided by the United States.

In March 2024, the Conservative Party UK Foreign Office minister Andrew Mitchell stated Israeli compliance with international humanitarian law was under review. UK shadow foreign secretary David Lammy stated arms export licenses should be denied if "there is a clear risk that the items might be used to commit or facilitate a serious violation of international humanitarian law". 600 UK lawyers, including three former justices of the Supreme Court of the United Kingdom, stated the UK's arming of Israel was a breach of international law. Following reports that month that the UK Foreign Office found Israel had violated international humanitarian law, Geoffrey Nice stated, "Countries supplying arms to Israel may now be complicit in criminal warfare."

In May 2024, Amnesty International called on all states to cease weapons transfers to Israel and Palestine while there is "a risk they could be used to commit or facilitate serious violations of international law". In June 2024, a group of thirty UN experts stated arms and ammunitions manufacturers transferring weapons to Israel may be complicit in violations of international law.

== International reactions ==
=== Governments ===
==== Heads of state ====
Numerous heads of state criticized Israel's war crimes. Turkish president Recep Tayyip Erdoğan criticized Western countries for their complicity as Israel committed war crimes. Colombian President Gustavo Petro termed Israel's campaign as a genocide. Egyptian President Abdel Fattah al-Sisi and King Abdullah II of Jordan both condemned the collective punishment of Gaza. Irish President Michael D. Higgins demanded the al-Ahli Arab Hospital explosion be investigated as a war crime. (Note: The perpetrator of this alleged war crime is disputed. While not a definitive conclusion, as of 23 October 2023, independent analysts asserted the explosion was caused by an errant rocket fired from within Gaza.) Chilean President Gabriel Boric condemned Israel's "collective punishment" the Gazan civilian population. South African President Cyril Ramaphosa condemned the collective punishment of Gaza. Brazilian President Luiz Inácio Lula da Silva stated, "It's not a war, it's a genocide."

Belgian deputy Prime Minister Petra De Sutter called for sanctions against Israel and an EU ban on countries responsible for war crimes. On 10 November 2023, Norwegian prime minister Jonas Gahr Støre stated Israel's actions violated international laws of war. Spanish Prime Minister Pedro Sanchez described the Israeli actions in Gaza as "indiscriminate killing" and stated he had "serious doubts" Israel was following international law. Palestinian president Mahmoud Abbas called Israel actions in Gaza a genocide. Irish PM Leo Varadkar stated Israel was committing collective punishment. Qatari prime minister Mohammed bin Abdulrahman bin Jassim Al Thani called for an international investigation into Israeli war crimes. On 12 December 2023, Joe Biden described Israel's attacks as "indiscriminate".

==== Foreign ministers ====
Chinese Foreign Minister Wang Yi stated Israel was collectively punishing Gaza. Indonesian Foreign Minister Retno Marsudi described Israeli actions in Gaza as crimes against humanity. Abdulla Shahid, Foreign Minister of the Maldives, warned the evacuation of northern Gaza could amount to the "war crime of forcible transfer". Iranian Foreign Minister Hossein Amirabdollahian described the events as genocide and a crime against humanity. Russian Foreign Minister Sergei Lavrov criticized Israel's "indiscriminate" force and "flagrant" violations of international humanitarian law, stating the conflict risked creating a crisis that would last "many decades, if not centuries".

In October 2023, Faisal Mekdad, Foreign Minister in Syria’s Assad regime, termed Israeli actions as a genocide. In a joint statement, the Foreign Ministers of nine Arab countries — the United Arab Emirates, Jordan, Bahrain, Saudi Arabia, Oman, Qatar, Kuwait, Egypt and Morocco — described Israeli actions as collective punishment. Oman's Foreign Minister, Sayyid Badr Albusaidi, called for a war crimes investigation into Israeli action in Gaza. Qatari foreign minister, Mohammed bin Abdulrahman bin Jassim Al Thani, stated Israel's Al-Shifa Hospital siege was a "war crime and a blatant violation of international laws". Ayman Safadi, the Jordanian foreign minister, stated Israel's actions fit within the legal definition of genocide. The Egyptian Foreign Ministry stated Israel was engaged in collective punishment through its sieges, indiscriminate targeting of civilians, and starvation.

On 9 January 2024, David Cameron, the British foreign secretary, stated he was "worried" Israel had breached international law in Gaza. On 14 January 2024, Cameron said that "Israel is acting in self-defence" and denied that Israel is committing war crimes in Gaza. On 14 February, Italian foreign minister Antonio Tajani described Israel's attack on Gaza as disproportionate. Pietro Parolin, the Vatican's Secretary of State, described Israel's response as disproportionate. Quoting Giora Eiland, the EU's top diplomat Josep Borrell stated Israel's objective appeared to be to "turn Gaza into a place that is temporarily or permanently impossible to live in". Borrell later suggested the EU should consider sanctions on Israeli ministers Bezalel Smotrich and Itamar Ben-Gvir for "incitement to war crimes". Micheál Martin, the Irish foreign minister, stated the 7 October attacks and Israel's actions in Gaza both "represents the blatant violation of international humanitarian law on a mass scale".

==== Other officials ====
Ione Belarra, the Spanish minister of social rights, accused the EU and the US of "being complicit in Israel's war crimes." Belarra further called for Israel to be denounced before the International Criminal Court for genocide in the Gaza Strip. Brazil’s Workers Party officially classified Israeli actions in Gaza as genocide. The Parliament of Sri Lanka sent a letter to the UN secretary general, stating, Israel's "indiscriminate bombings in hospitals, amounts to a war crime under international law and the Geneva Convention." U.S. officials reported alarm at Israeli claims of the "inevitability" of civilian deaths, after they used the atomic bombings of Hiroshima and Nagasaki as historical examples. On 20 December 2023, HuffPost reported US officials were urging Switzerland against a Geneva Convention conference. Eran Etzion, the former deputy head of Israel's National Security Council, stated, "If a soldier or an officer is expected to commit something that might be suspected as a war crime, they must refuse."

U.S. Senator Chris Van Hollen accused Israel of committing "textbook war crimes". French Senator Guillaume Gontard stated that the Israeli prime minister was "using hunger as a weapon" in Gaza. Australian Senator Mehreen Faruqi stated, "Israel is committing war crime after war crime in broad daylight and is getting away with it."

Vanessa Frazier, the Maltese ambassador to the UN, stated Israel's blocking of humanitarian aid "may amount to a crime against humanity and a war crime". Qatari diplomat Sheikha Alya Ahmed Saif Al-Thani stated the Al-Shifa Hospital siege was a war crime. Nicolas de Rivière, the French ambassador to the United Nations, called for an immediate ceasefire, stating, "It has to stop. What’s happening right now is totally contrary to the Geneva Conventions." In a confidential memo, the Dutch defense attaché stated Israel was violating international law by "deliberately causing massive destruction to the infrastructure and civilian centers" of Gaza to restore deterrence against Iran and Hezbollah.

=== Humanitarian organizations ===
On 6 December, Oxfam stated the international community, and in particular, Israel's allies, were "complicit in the mass death, forcible displacement, starvation and deprivation being inflicted upon more than 2 million people." The International Federation for Human Rights stated Israel's actions in Gaza constituted an unfolding genocide and called for the arrest of Israeli government officials. A group of 31 Palestinian human rights organizations, led by Al-Haq, wrote to UN chief António Guterres stating UN aid agencies were in breach of international law by aiding Israel's war objectives. The Norwegian Refugee Council stated any push of Gazans into Egypt would be a war crime or crime against humanity. The Non-Aligned Movement, a body of 120 countries, issued a statement calling Israel's war on Gaza "illegal".

In February 2024, Amnesty International warned that states arming Israel risked violating international law, stating, "By providing arms to Israel, EU states and the US are violating their responsibility to prevent genocide and contributing to war crimes and crimes against humanity." Agnes Callamard, the head of Amnesty, wrote for Foreign Affairs, stating international law was in its "death throes" due to the "culmination of years of erosion of the international rule of law and global human rights system". The Israel-Palestine director for Human Rights Watch stated that years of no accountability for Israel had led to "this flagrant disregard for the most basic principles" of international law. In March 2024, the Palestinian Centre for Human Rights stated that Europe and the U.S. were allowing Israel to commit crimes "with the absence of mechanisms that would compel it to abide by the rules of international humanitarian law". Physicians for Human Rights–Israel stated it was preparing to take the Israeli military to court for its "indiscriminate" bombing of Gaza, stating Israel was failing to fulfill its "obligation according to international humanitarian law".

In May 2024, the World Council of Churches condemned Israel's "violations of international humanitarian law". The International Committee of the Red Cross urged adherence to the Geneva Conventions in August 2024, stating they were being ignored in Gaza and elsewhere.

=== United Nations ===
Independent United Nations experts (Note: Francesca Albanese, Pedro Arrojo-Agudo, Balakrishnan Rajagopal, Aua Baldé, Gabriella Citroni, Angkhana Neelapaijit, Grażyna Baranowska, Ana Lorena Delgadillo Pérez, Reem Alsalem, Mama Fatima Singhateh, Morris Tidball-Binz, Ian Fry, Javaid Rehman, Siobhán Mullally, Ashwini K. P., Tomoya Obokata, Fernand de Varennes, Michael Fakhri, Irene Khan, Mary Lawlor, Dorothy Estrada-Tanck, Ivana Radačić, Elizabeth Broderick, Meskerem Geset Techane, Melissa Upreti, Farida Shaheed, Mohamed Abdelsalam Babiker, Clément Nyaletsossi Voule, Attiya Waris, Vitit Muntarbhorn, Barbara G. Reynolds, Bina D'Costa, Catherine S. Namakula, Dominique Day, Miriam Ekiudoko, Isha Dyfan, Alexandra Xanthaki, José Francisco Calí Tzay, Richard Bennett, Obiora C. Okafor, David Richard Boyd, Livingstone Sewanyana, Alice Jill Edwards, Muluka-Anne Miti-Drummond, Ravindran Daniel, Sorcha MacLeod, Chris Kwaja, Carlos Salazar Couto, and Surya Deva.) condemned the IDF's actions in Gaza, saying Israel had resorted to "indiscriminate military attacks" and "collective punishment". Israeli authorities said that the airstrikes are intended to degrade the military infrastructure that is frequently constructed in close proximity to residential areas and civilian establishments. They also denounced the "deliberate and widespread killing and hostage-taking of innocent civilians" by Hamas, calling them "heinous violations of international law and international crimes". Israel's forced evacuation of northern Gaza also drew international condemnation. On 13 October 2023, Paula Gaviria Betancur, UN Special Rapporteur on the human rights of internally displaced persons, called it a "crime against humanity". On 14 October, Francesca Albanese, the United Nations Special Rapporteur on the occupied Palestinian territories, characterized it as a "repeat of the 1948 Nakba", noting Israeli public officials' open advocacy for another Nakba. On 16 November, UN experts reported that "grave violations" committed by Israeli forces against the Palestinians of Gaza "point to a genocide in the making" and called on the international community to prevent this unfolding genocide. The OHCHR expressed concern regarding reports of "mass detentions, ill-treatment and enforced disappearances of possibly thousands of Palestinians" in the north of Gaza.

On 23 February 2024, the OHCHR stated that any transfer of weapons to Israel must be halted immediately as their use in Gaza is "likely to violate international humanitarian law". On 27 March, Albanese stated that there are "reasonable grounds" to believe that Israel is committing genocide in Gaza through the use of unlawful weaponry, the destruction of civilian infrastructure and man made starvation, which has been accompanied by "a pervasive anti-Palestinian narrative and dehumanization emanating from the uppermost tiers of Israeli society." In March 2024, Betancur stated the world "must abandon the fiction that Israel will respect the principles of international humanitarian and human rights law in its military operations". Balakrishnan Rajagopal, the UN special rapporteur on the right to adequate housing, stated Israel's destruction of housing and civilian infrastructure amounted to a war crime and crime against humanity. (Note: Rajagopal stated, "If the International Criminal Court does not act very soon, we need a special tribunal for Gaza and action by States".) UN Human Rights chief Volker Türk stated Israel's collective punishment and forcible evacuation of Gazans were both war crimes.

According to UNRWA, its staff faced "torture, ill-treatment, abuse, and sexual exploitation" at the hands of Israeli authorities. The organization also accused Israel of extracting forced confessions from its staff of being involved with Hamas through torture.

A group of UN experts warned of "a genocide in the making" in Gaza. Pedro Arrojo-Agudo, the UN special rapporteur on water and sanitation, stated that under Article 7 of the Rome Statute, cutting off basic supplies, such as water, was a crime against humanity. Martin Griffiths stated the humanitarian crisis in Gaza was intolerable and that "international humanitarian law appears to have been turned on its head". Philippe Lazzarini called Israel's killing of United Nations workers a "blatant disregard of international humanitarian law". The United Nations special rapporteurs on extrajudicial executions and torture signed a joint statement urging a war crimes investigation. The OHCHR stated it had "serious concerns" about Israel's compliance with international law. Tlaleng Mofokeng, the special rapporteur on health, stated Israel had violated special medical protections in an "unrelenting war" on health.

Speaking about Israel's planned Rafah offensive, the UN secretary-general Antonio Guterres stated, "International humanitarian law lies in tatters". A week later, Guterres condemned Israel's blocking of humanitarian aid, stating, "Nothing justifies the collective punishment of the Palestinian people". In September 2024, Guterres stated Israel had committed "very dramatic violations of the international humanitarian law" and described a "total absence of an effective protection of civilians."

On 8 June 2024, the United Nations added Israel, Hamas, and the Palestinian Islamic Jihad to a blacklist of countries and organizations that have committed abuses against children in armed conflict. Regarding Israel being put on the list, President Netanyahu said the United Nations had put itself on the "blacklist of history". Israel-UN Reperesentative Gilad Erdan also condemned the designation, describing it as "simply outrageous and wrong", despite Israel being responsible for overwhelming majority of civilian fatalities in the war, and having killed over 15,500 children by June. Chris Sidoti, a member of the independent United Nations Commission of Inquiry, stated, "The only conclusion you can draw is that the Israeli army is one of the most criminal armies in the world".

== Lawsuits and investigations ==
=== Investigations ===
The UK's Foreign, Commonwealth and Development Office opened an investigation into Israeli violations of international humanitarian law. Court documents cited by Amnesty International indicated the UK office was unable to determine if Israel was in compliance with international law, but concluded there were "serious concerns" about legal breaches. In February 2024, the U.S. State Department announced it was investigating the 31 October 2023 Jabalia refugee camp airstrike and Israel's possible use of white phosphorus in Lebanon. Alice Jill Edwards, the United Nations Special Rapporteur on Torture, stated she was investigating torture and mistreatment of Palestinian detainees by the Israeli army.

Following the release of footage showing airstrikes killing five Palestinian men walking along a dirt road in Gaza, the IDF announced the incident was being investigated by its "fact finding" body for potential crimes by its forces. A US State Department official said, "Israel has an obligation to investigate credible allegations of law of war violations". In April 2024, the U.S. Secretary of State denied it had "double-standards" regarding Israel, stating the U.S. was "looking at" alleged violations of international humanitarian law. In an internal U.S. State Department memo, senior officials stated they did not find Israel's assurances that it's using U.S. weapons in accordance with international humanitarian law "credible or reliable". On 29 April, the United States reported a finding that five Israeli units committed human rights violations before the Gaza war. In May 2024, the U.S. State Department found it was "reasonable to assess" that U.S. made weapons had been used by Israel "in instances inconsistent" with international humanitarian law. In June 2024, Israel's top military lawyer stated 70 possible legal violations were under investigation. The military did not disclose the full list of investigations.

In July 2024, Israeli state prosecutors stated they were seeking a probe into National Security minister Itamar Ben-Gvir, as a measure to show the International Court of Justice it was complying with its orders to investigate individuals responsible for inciting genocide. In September 2024, Behadrei Haredim, an Israeli Orthodox news site, reported that Israeli officials had shared its investigatory findings related to 7 October with the United States, except for evidence collected from IDF soldiers, fearing the evidence could be used in The Hague. In October 2024, Belgium opened an investigation of one of its dual citizens suspected of committing war crimes in the Gaza Strip.

According to five former US officials on November 7, 2025, last year, Israeli military lawyers reported that evidence might be sufficient to support Israeli's accusations of war crimes. US decided that its support for Israel was still legal because the US had not collected its own evidence of this kind.

=== Lawsuits ===
==== ICC lawsuits ====
On 9 November 2023, three Palestinian civil rights groups filed a lawsuit against Israel with the International Criminal Court. The groups charged Israel with war crimes, apartheid, and genocide, calling for the ICC to issue arrest warrants for top Israeli officials. On 10 November, President Gustavo Petro announced Colombia was cosponsoring an Algerian ICC suit charging Israel with war crimes. On 14 November, Human Rights Watch called on the ICC to investigate Israeli attacks on hospitals and ambulances. A group of lawyers representing victims of Israeli attacks filed a suit in the ICC, charging Israel with genocide. South African foreign minister Naledi Pandor called on the ICC to speed up its investigation of Israeli war crimes, crimes against humanity, and genocide, and stated warrants of arrest should be issued for Benjamin Netanyahu. On 16 November, South African president Cyril Ramaphosa stated South Africa had referred Israel to the ICC for war crimes. On 17 November, Karim Ahmad Khan stated the ICC had received a joint request by South Africa, Bangladesh, Bolivia, Comoros, and Djibouti to investigate alleged Israeli war crimes. On 28 November, Turkish President Recep Tayyip Erdogan stated Israeli officials should stand trial in international courts for war crimes. On 20 December, DAWN provided the ICC prosecutor with a list of 40 Israeli commanding officers to be charged with war crimes.

On 22 December 2023, Reporters Without Borders filed an ICC complaint against Israel for "probable war crimes". On 6 January, a group of 100 Chilean lawyers filed a complaint at the ICC accusing Netanyahu of committing war crimes. On 18 January, the foreign ministries of Mexico and Chile referred Israel to the ICC for potential war crimes. (Note: Both countries representatives stated the referral was in part due to the increased violence and previous numerous reports from the United Nations.) In October 2024, a Dutch lawyer submitted the names of 1,000 IDF soldiers to the ICC, stating they had participated in war crimes.

In April 2024, the government of Israel indicated concern that the ICC might soon issue arrest warrants for senior Israeli officials for alleged violations of international humanitarian law in Gaza. In May 2024, prosecutors from the ICC reportedly interviewed two medics from Al-Shifa Hospital and Nasser Hospital about possible crimes committed in Gaza. Later the same month, Reporters Without Borders filed its third Gaza complaint at the ICC. The ICC chief prosecutor requested arrest warrants for Israeli prime minister Benjamin Netanyahu and defense minister Yoav Gallant in May 2024; however, the court accepted amicus curiae observations on jurisdictional issues. In November 2024, it was announced that the ICC had issued arrest warrants for Netanyahu, Gallant, and a senior Hamas official, accusing them of war crimes during and after the October 7 attacks.

==== ICJ lawsuit ====
Stances of states on South Africa v. Israel: South Africa Countries that have supported South Africa's case Countries that have opposed South Africa's case Israel

In December 2023, South Africa instituted proceedings at the International Court of Justice pursuant to the Genocide Convention, accusing Israel of committing genocide, war crimes, and crimes against humanity against Palestinians in Gaza. South African president Cyril Ramaphosa compared Israel's actions to apartheid. Several international organisations and other nations supported South Africa's suit.

In its application, South Africa argued that Israel's actions "are genocidal in character because they are intended to bring about the destruction of a substantial part of the Palestinian national, racial and ethnical group". South Africa requested that the ICJ issue an interim order requiring Israel to "immediately suspend its military operations in and against Gaza".

On 26 January 2024, the ICJ issued a preliminary ruling finding that the rights asserted in South Africa's filing were "plausible" and issued an order requiring that Israel take all measures in its power to prevent acts of genocide, prevent and punish incitement to genocide, and allow basic humanitarian services into Gaza. Later that year, South Africa asked the ICJ to order additional measures against Israel, and in May, the court issued what some experts considered to be an ambiguous order but which was widely understood as requiring Israel to immediately halt its offensive in Rafah. Israel rejected this interpretation and continued its offensive.

The Israeli government spokesman Eylon Levy rejected the allegations "with disgust" and accused South Africa of cooperating with Hamas, calling South Africa's claims "blood libel". On 2 January 2024, Israel decided to appear before the ICJ in response to South Africa's case, despite a history of ignoring international tribunals. On 13 January, Netanyahu said, "No one will stop us. Not The Hague, not the Axis of Evil, no one." Israeli officials accused the court of antisemitic bias. Israel asserted that it had taken all possible measures to safeguard civilians during its military campaign in Gaza. Some left-wing Israeli politicians, including Ofer Cassif, supported South Africa's case.

International Court of Justice Vice President Julia Sebutinde was one of the 17 judges ruling on provisional measures in South Africa's genocide case against Israel. She voted against all the provisional measures, and was the only permanent judge to vote against any of the measures. In her dissenting opinion, Sebutinde wrote, "multiple concrete actions were taken by Israel to facilitate the provision of humanitarian aid for the civilian population of Gaza." She was accused of plagiarizing large parts of her dissenting opinion from pro-Israel sources, Wikipedia, and the BBC. According to political scientist Norman Finkelstein, "at least 32 percent of Sebutinde's dissent was plagiarised", including from writings by Douglas Feith.

In May 2024, the ICJ ordered Israel to avoid any attack on Rafah which threatened the people of Gaza in whole or in part. After Israel continued with its offensive on Rafah, Norway’s Foreign Minister Espen Barth Eide stated it was in "material breach" of the ICJ ruling and international humanitarian law.

==== CCR lawsuit against Joe Biden ====
On 13 November 2023, the New York-based Center for Constitutional Rights (CCR) sued Joe Biden for allegedly failing in his duties, defined under national and international laws, to prevent Israel committing genocide in Gaza. The complaint, filed on behalf of Palestinians in Gaza and the US, alleged that Israel's "mass killings", targeting of civilian infrastructure and forced expulsions amounted to genocide. The CCR said that the US and other countries had a duty to do all they could to stop the killing. "As Israel's closest ally and strongest supporter, being its biggest provider of military assistance by a large margin and with Israel being the largest cumulative recipient of US foreign assistance since World War II, the United States has the means available to have a deterrent effect on Israeli officials now pursuing genocidal acts against the Palestinian people in Gaza," the complaint argued.

The suit, filed in federal court in California, asked the court to bar the US from providing weapons, money and diplomatic support to Israel. It also sought a declaration that the president, the secretary of state, Antony Blinken, and the defense secretary, Lloyd Austin, were required "to take all measures within their power to prevent Israel's commission of genocidal acts against the Palestinian people of Gaza." Genocide scholar William Schabas said in a declaration in the lawsuit that in his view there was a "serious risk of genocide" and that the US was "in breach of its obligation" under the 1948 Genocide Convention and international law.

On 31 January 2024, the case was dismissed. The judge said that the US Constitution limited his actions, that he would have preferred to have issued the injunction and urged President Biden to rethink U.S. policy, writing "it is plausible that Israel's conduct amounts to genocide."

==== Hague lawsuit ====
On 4 December 2023, Human rights organisations Oxfam Novib, PAX Nederland, and The Rights Forum had taken the Dutch State to court to stop the export of parts for F-35 fighter jets arguing that they contribute to violations of international law in Gaza. Oxfam argued that the export "made the Netherlands complicit in violations of the laws of war and the collective punishment of the civilian population of Gaza". On 15 December 2023, The Hague ruled that the state could keep exporting arms to Israel. On 12 February 2024, the court of appeal in The Hague ruled that "There is a clear risk that Israel's F-35 fighter jets might be used in the commission of serious violations of international humanitarian law." The judges wrote, "Israel does not take sufficient account of the consequences of its attacks for the civilian population. Israel's attacks on Gaza have resulted in a disproportionate number of civilian casualties, including thousands of children" and that, " The Netherlands is a party to several international regulations which stipulate that if a clear risk of serious violations of international humanitarian law exists, the Netherlands has the obligation to prevent the export of military equipment." The court ordered that deliveries must stop within seven days.

==== High Court lawsuit ====
On 6 December 2023, Palestinian human rights organisation Al-Haq and UK-based Global Legal Action Network (GLAN) have commenced legal proceedings against the UK after written requests to suspend arms sales to Israel, citing alleged breaches of international law and UK rules, were repeatedly ignored. The filed papers detail allegations of indiscriminate attacks on civilians, starvation, forced displacement, and the serious risk of genocide, including statements from members of the Knesset and military leaders. The action is supported by the International Centre of Justice for Palestinians (ICJP) and a press briefing was held with GLAN, Al-Haq and ICJP and with Campaign Against Arms Trade (CAAT) and a member from Oxfam. The NGOs' lawyers submitted more than 100 pages of witness statements to the High Court in August 2024.

==== Federal Court of Australia lawsuit ====
On 5 December 2023, Palestinian human rights groups, Al-Haq, Al Mezan Center for Human Rights and the Palestinian Centre for Human Rights (PCHR) have launched legal action in the Federal Court of Australia. The human rights groups seek access to all permits allowing the export of arms and weapons to Israel that have been granted by the Minister for Defence since 7 October 2023. The application is supported by the Australian Centre for International Justice (ACIJ).

==== Canadian Global Affairs Ministry lawsuit ====
On 5 March 2024, Canadian Lawyers for International Human Rights (CLIHR), Al-Haq and a group of Palestinian-Canadians, have sued the Global Affairs Ministry for exporting military goods and technology to Israel during the Gaza conflict. They argue that the exports could be used in alleged human rights violations against Palestinians. The legal action accuses Canada's Foreign Minister Mélanie Joly of authorising the export of military goods and technology to Israel, amounting to at least at least C$28.5m ($21m), that could be used to commit violations of international law.

==== Other ====
In June 2024, a group of South Korean civil society organizations sued top Israeli government officials for genocide, crimes against humanity, and war crimes.

The Hind Rajab Foundation has brought legal action in several countries against Israeli soldiers allegedly responsible for war crimes.

== See also ==
- Outline of the Gaza war
- Risk factors for genocide
- Social cleansing
- War and genocide

== Sources ==
- Abodahab, Ahmad Mokhtar; Elsergany, AbdelAzim Nagdy (April 2025). "Children Disabilities, The Current and Upcoming Medical & Humanity Catastrophe in Gaza: Review Article". The Egyptian Journal of Hospital Medicine. 99: 1705–1710. doi:10.21608/ejhm.2025.423789.
- Aftab, Shiza; Yaqoob, Eesha; Khan, Shahzad Ali; Javed, Saad (April 2025). "Addressing emergency trauma care needs in the Gaza Strip". Eastern Mediterranean Health Journal. 31 (4): 226–227. doi:10.26719/2025.31.4.226. PMID 40448484. Archived from the original on 19 September 2025.
- Investigating war crimes in Gaza (YouTube). Al Jazeera Investigations. 3 October 2024.
- Albanese, Francesca (25 March 2024). Anatomy of a Genocide: Report of the Special Rapporteur on the situation of human rights in the Palestinian territories occupied since 1967, Francesca Albanese (PDF) (Report). United Nations Special Rapporteur on the occupied Palestinian territories. Archived (PDF) from the original on 28 January 2025.
- Amnesty International (2024). 'You Feel Like You Are Subhuman': Israel's Genocide Against Palestinians In Gaza (PDF) (Report). Archived (PDF) from the original on 5 December 2024.
- Bouranova, Alene (6 June 2024). "Is Israel Committing Genocide in Gaza? New Report from BU School of Law's International Human Rights Clinic Lays Out Case". Boston University. Archived from the original on 5 June 2024.
- B'Tselem (July 2025). Our Genocide (PDF) (Report). Archived (PDF) from the original on 30 July 2025.
- Burga, Solcyré (13 November 2023). "Is What's Happening in Gaza a Genocide? Experts Weigh In". Time. Archived from the original on 25 November 2023.
- Buschek, Christo; Christoph, Maria; Kalisch, Muriel; Kollig, Dajana; Obermaier, Frederik; Retter, Maria (25 June 2024). "(S+) The Gaza Project: Sie berichten aus der Todeszone – viele kostet das ihr Leben" [(S+) The Gaza Project: They report from the death zone – many lose their lives]. Der Spiegel (in German). ISSN 2195-1349. Archived from the original on 26 July 2024.
- Casciani, Dominic (16 May 2024). "Israel-Gaza: What did the ICJ ruling really say?". BBC.
- Casciani, Dominic (28 May 2024). "Israel-Gaza: What does ICJ ruling on Israel's Rafah offensive mean?". BBC News. Archived from the original on 29 May 2024.
- Clayton, Freddie (27 May 2024). "Isolated Israel argues U.N. court ruling leaves door open to Rafah offensive". NBC News. Archived from the original on 27 November 2024.
- Conley, Julia (3 January 2024). "100+ Global Rights Groups Urge Support for South Africa's Genocide Case Against Israel at ICJ". Common Dreams. Archived from the original on 6 January 2024.
- Corder, Mike (2 January 2024). "South Africa's genocide case against Israel sets up a high-stakes legal battle at the UN's top court". ABC News. Archived from the original on 7 January 2024.
- De Vogli, Roberto; Montomoli, Jonathan; Abu-Sittah, Ghassan; Pappé, Ilan (August 2025). "Break the selective silence on the genocide in Gaza". The Lancet. 406 (10504): 688–689. doi:10.1016/S0140-6736(25)01541-7. PMID 40752501.
- Donoghue, Joan (25 April 2024). "Joan Donoghue – Former President of the International Court of Justice". HARDtalk (Interview). Interviewed by Stephen Sackur. BBC.
- Dumper, Michael; Badran, Amneh (2024). "Introduction". In Dumper, Michael; Badran, Amneh (eds.). Routledge Handbook on Palestine (1st ed.). Routledge. doi:10.4324/9781003031994. ISBN 9781003031994.
- El Chamaa, Mohamad (1 December 2023). "Gazans mourn loss of their libraries: Cultural beacons and communal spaces". The Washington Post.
- Fayyad, Huthifa (17 September 2024). "Nearly 1,000 Palestinian health workers killed by Israeli forces in Gaza named". Middle East Eye. Archived from the original on 16 January 2025.
- Gessen, Masha (7 February 2024). "The Limits of Accusing Israel of Genocide". The New Yorker. Archived from the original on 7 February 2024.
- Gómez-Ugarte, Ana C.; Chen, Irena; Acosta, Enrique; Basellini, Ugofilippo; Alburez-Gutierrez, Diego (13 October 2025). "Accounting for uncertainty in conflict mortality estimation: an application to the Gaza War in 2023-2024". Population Health Metrics. 23 55: 1–15. doi:10.1186/s12963-025-00422-9. PMID 41084007.
- Graham-Harrison, Emma (25 February 2024). "Gaza death toll set to pass 30,000, as Israel prepares assault on Rafah". The Guardian. Archived from the original on 27 February 2024.
- Haque, Adil Ahmad (24 May 2024). "Halt: The International Court of Justice and the Rafah Offensive". Just Security. Archived from the original on 17 November 2024.
- Harghandiwal, Beheshta (22 April 2025). "Impact of the humanitarian crisis in Gaza on children's health: Evidence and recommendations for mitigation". Global Public Health. 20 (1) ((2495326)). doi:10.1080/17441692.2025.2495326. PMID 40260702.
- "One year of denouncing the genocide of Palestinians in Gaza". International Federation for Human Rights. 12 December 2024.
- IPC global initiative (22 August 2025). "GAZA STRIP: Famine confirmed in Gaza Governorate, projected to expand | 1 July – 30 September 2025" (PDF). Integrated Food Security Phase Classification.
- Jamaluddine, Zeina; Abukmail, Hanan; Aly, Sarah; Campbell, Oona M. R.; Checchi, Francesco (9 January 2025). "Traumatic injury mortality in the Gaza Strip from Oct 7, 2023, to June 30, 2024: a capture–recapture analysis". The Lancet. 405 (10477). Elsevier: 469–477. doi:10.1016/S0140-6736(24)02678-3.
- Jimoh, Abdullahi (4 January 2024). "Over 100 Global Organisations Rally for South Africa's Genocide Case Against Israel at ICJ". News Central TV. Archived from the original on 6 January 2024.
- Lawless, Jill (12 July 2024). "Senior UK jurists have joined calls to stop arms sales to Israel. Other allies face similar pressure". Associated Press. Archived from the original on 26 July 2024.
- ——— (19 September 2025). "A Not So Textbook Case of Genocide". Journal of Genocide Research (Roundtable: Gaza and Genocide Studies): 1–12. doi:10.1080/14623528.2025.2556550.
- McDoom, Omar Shahabudin (25 April 2024). "Expert Commentary, the Israeli-Palestinian Conflict, and the Question of Genocide: Prosemitic Bias within a Scholarly Community?". Journal of Genocide Research (Forum: Israel–Palestine: Atrocity Crimes and the Crisis of Holocaust and Genocide Studies): 1–9. doi:10.1080/14623528.2024.2346403.
- Marsi, Federica; Siddiqui, Usaid; Motamedi, Maziar (28 March 2024). "ICJ orders Israel to stop preventing 'delivery of urgently needed' aid". Al Jazeera. Archived from the original on 2 April 2024.
- Massoud, Bassam; Fick, Maggie (23 December 2023). "Gaza death toll: why counting the dead has become a daily struggle". Reuters. Archived from the original on 14 January 2024.
- "Gaza genocide". Médecins Sans Frontières. 10 July 2025. Archived from the original on 10 July 2025.
- Moor, Ahmed (27 March 2025). "There are more child amputees in Gaza than anywhere else in the world. What can the future hold for them?". The Guardian. Archived from the original on 16 August 2025.
- Mohyeldin, Ayman; Hamdan, Basel (10 December 2024). "Why Amnesty International and other experts say Israel is committing genocide in Gaza". MSNBC. Archived from the original on 3 July 2025.
- Moses, A. Dirk (19 September 2025). "Introduction: Gaza and the Problems of Genocide Studies". Journal of Genocide Research (Roundtable: Gaza and Genocide Studies): 1–14. doi:10.1080/14623528.2025.2558401.
- Moutafa, Laila Hussein (12 December 2023). "Opinion: When libraries like Gaza's are destroyed, what's lost is far more than books". Los Angeles Times. Archived from the original on 8 August 2024.
- Muthumani, Abirami (January 2024). "Safeguarding children through pediatric surgical care in war and humanitarian settings: a call to action for pediatric patients in Gaza". World Journal of Pediatric Surgery. 7 (1): ((e000719)). doi:10.1136/wjps-2023-000719. PMC 10910480. PMID 38440223.
- Narea, Nicole (25 October 2024). "Is Israel committing genocide? Reexamining the question, a year later". Vox.
- Neuman, Scott; Baba, Anas; Wood, Daniel (1 June 2024). "In Gaza, months of war have left Palestinians with barely the necessities to survive". NPR. Archived from the original on 22 August 2024.
- Quigley, John (3 July 2024). "The Lancet and Genocide By "Slow Death" in Gaza". Arab Center Washington DC. Archived from the original on 13 July 2024.
- Rifai, Sulaiman Lebbe (24 January 2024). "The Genocide in Gaza and the Contempt of International Law: Some Reflections". doi:10.2139/ssrn.4704652. S2CID 267982579. Archived from the original on 22 March 2024.
- Roelf, Wendell; Sterling, Toby (29 December 2023). "South Africa files genocide case against Israel at World Court". Reuters. Archived from the original on 31 December 2023.
- Saber, Indlieb Farazi (14 January 2024). "A 'cultural genocide': Which of Gaza's heritage sites have been destroyed?". Al Jazeera. Archived from the original on 13 August 2024.
- Salzenstein, Léopold (21 March 2024). "Behind the numbers: Gaza's unprecedented aid worker death toll". The New Humanitarian. Archived from the original on 19 December 2024.
- Schwarz, Franziska (16 August 2024). ""Düsterer Meilenstein": UN benennt Zahl der täglichen Toten im Gazastreifen" ["Gloomy milestone": UN names number of daily deaths in the Gaza Strip]. Frankfurter Rundschau (in German). Archived from the original on 23 August 2024.
- Shamim, Sarah (11 January 2024). "Which countries back South Africa's genocide case against Israel at ICJ?". Al Jazeera. Archived from the original on 26 January 2024.
- Shatali, Ala; Rashid, Fatima; Lubbad, Ilham; Potterton, Joanne; Geilen, Bart; Ali, Sanah; Sidhanee, Abu (April 2025). "Meeting the rehabilitation needs of children with debilitating injuries and disability in Gaza". Eastern Mediterranean Health Journal. 31 (4): 219–225. doi:10.26719/2025.31.4.219. PMID 40448483. Archived from the original on 19 September 2025.
- ——— (19 September 2025). "The Genocide that Changed the World". Journal of Genocide Research (Roundtable: Gaza and Genocide Studies): 1–15. doi:10.1080/14623528.2025.2556575. hdl:10230/71505.
- Sherwani, Maryam; Stewart, Richard; Samad, Lubna (10 March 2025). "The Disproportionate Surgical Burden Borne by Children in Regions of Armed Conflict". World Journal of Surgery. 49 (7): 1840–1845. doi:10.1002/wjs.12560. PMID 40133763.
- Speri, Alice (20 December 2024). "Defining genocide: how a rift over Gaza sparked a crisis among scholars". The Guardian. Archived from the original on 21 December 2024.
- Stack, Liam; Shbair, Bilal (6 May 2024). "With Schools in Ruins, Education in Gaza Will Be Hobbled for Years". New York Times. Archived from the original on 15 July 2024.
- Sultany, Nimer (9 May 2024). "A Threshold Crossed: On Genocidal Intent and the Duty to Prevent Genocide in Palestine". Journal of Genocide Research (Forum: Gaza: International Humanitarian Law and Genocide): 1–26. doi:10.1080/14623528.2024.2351261.
- Swart, Mia (5 August 2025). "South Africa v Israel: South Africa's case at the International Court of Justice". The Round Table: The Commonwealth Journal of International Affairs and Policy Studies. 114 (5): 687–689. doi:10.1080/00358533.2025.2542794.
- Tantesh, Malak A.; Graham-Harrison, Emma (15 August 2024). "Gaza rubble likely to conceal untold horrors to swell 40,000 death toll". The Guardian. Archived from the original on 22 August 2024.
- Taub, Amanda (30 May 2024). "What the I.C.J. Ruling Actually Means for Israel's Offensive in Rafah". The New York Times. ISSN 0362-4331. Archived from the original on 19 December 2024.
- Tharoor, Ishaan (30 July 2025). "Leading genocide scholars see a genocide happening in Gaza". The Washington Post. Archived from the original on 11 August 2025.
- United Nations Independent International Commission of Inquiry on the Occupied Palestinian Territory and Israel (16 September 2025). Legal analysis of the conduct of Israel in Gaza pursuant to the Convention on the Prevention and Punishment of the Crime of Genocide (PDF). OHCHR (Report). Archived (PDF) from the original on 16 September 2025.
- van Laarhoven, Kasper; Peek, Eva; Walters, Derk (14 May 2025). "Zeven gerenommeerde wetenschappers vrijwel eensgezind: Israël pleegt in Gaza genocide". NRC (in Dutch). Archived from the original on 15 May 2025.
- Wintour, Patrick (29 May 2024). "How a single comma is allowing Israel to question ICJ Rafah ruling". The Guardian. Archived from the original on 13 November 2024.
