= Pedro Arrojo-Agudo =

Spanish physicist, economist, environmentalist, and professor

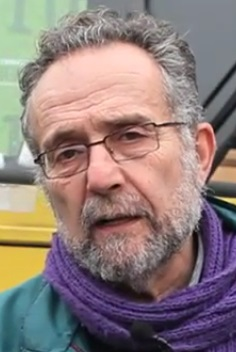
- Pedro Arrojo in March 2012
- Occupations: Physicist and economist
- Employer: University of Zaragoza
- Awards: Goldman Environmental Prize (2003)

Pedro Arrojo-Agudo (Madrid, 13 April 1951) is a Spanish physicist, economist, environmentalist, and a professor at the University of Zaragoza. He was awarded the Goldman Environmental Prize in 2003, for his contributions to conservation of water. He was made the United Nations Special Rapporteur on the human rights to safe drinking water and sanitation in October 2020.

== Biography ==
Born in Madrid, Arrojo-Agudo grew up in Granada before moving to Zaragoza in 1969 to study physics, graduating in 1973. He earned his doctorate in physics from the University of Zaragoza with a thesis on fluid mechanics. He became the first Spaniard to receive the Goldman Environmental Prize for the European region based on his opposition to the proposed National Hydrological Plan of 2001.

In the 2015 general election, he led the deputies list from Podemos in Zaragoza, winning his seat. He was later elected as deputy from Unidos Podemos por Zaragoza in the 2016 general election and served as spokesman of the Committee on Agriculture, Food and Environment.
