= Guidelines for the Registration of Organizations =

Israeli guidelines of registration for NGOs

Guidelines for the Registration of Organizations is a rule by Israel requiring "registration" of international NGOs. Israel said it would block 37 organizations in 2026.

== Grounds for denial or revocation ==
Grounds for denial or revocation of registration includes the organization:

1. "denies the existence of the State of Israel as a Jewish and democratic state;"
2. "incites to racism"
3. "supports an armed struggle by an enemy state or a terrorist organization against the State of Israel; the organization has been designated as a terrorist organization by the Minister of Defense pursuant to the Combating Terrorism Law, 5776-2016; a member, officeholder, partner, board member, or founder of the organization has been designated by the Minister of Defense as a terrorist operative pursuant to the Combating Terrorism Law (hereinafter: “Designated Terrorist Organization” and “Designated Terrorist Operative”); or the organization maintains or has maintained ties with a Designated Terrorist Organization or a Designated Terrorist Operative, including providing financial support to a Designated Terrorist Organization"
4. "involvement in criminal activity poses a risk to public safety and security"
5. "declared purpose and/or actual activities of the organization serve as a cover for illegal activities under the laws of Israel or Judea and Samaria (West Bank)"
6. "registration application was based on false information, or, contrary to what was stated therein, the organization’s primary activities are not directed toward Palestinian residents for the purpose of promoting their welfare, or the organization has violated a condition of its registration"
7. "including any officeholder, partner, board member, or founder, has, knowingly and publicly, within the seven years preceding the date of the registration application, called for a boycott of the State of Israel, as defined in the Law for Prevention of Damage to State of Israel through Boycott, 5771-2011, or has committed to participating in such a boycott"
8. "actively promotes delegitimization campaigns against the State of Israel, as stipulated in Decision No. B/188 of the Ministerial Committee for National Security Affairs dated 8.3.2017"
9. "has, in writing or orally, published statements denying the Holocaust, as defined in the Denial of Holocaust (Prohibition) Law, 5746-1986"
10. "has, in writing or orally, published statements denying the massacre of October 7, 2023 (the Shemini Atzeret Massacre), as defined in the Prohibition of Denial of Massacre Incidents of October 7, 2023 (the Shemini Atzeret Massacre) Law 5785-2025"
11. "has, in writing or orally, expressed support for legal proceedings against Israeli citizens in a foreign country or before an international tribunal, for actions carried out in the course of their duties in the Israel Defense Forces or in any security agency of the State of Israel"
12. "has failed to comply with its reporting obligations as required under Section 11 of these Guidelines"
13. "is a law-violating entity"

== Organizations banned in 2026 ==
1. Action Against Hunger
2. ActionAid
3. Alianza por la Solidaridad
4. CARE International
5. Campaign for the Children of Palestine
6. DanChurchAid
7. Danish Refugee Council
8. Humanity & Inclusion
9. Japan International Volunteer Center
10. Médecins du Monde France
11. Médecins du Monde Switzerland
12. Médecins Sans Frontières Belgium
13. Médecins Sans Frontières France
14. Médecins Sans Frontières Nederland
15. Médicos del Mundo
16. Mercy Corps
17. Médecins Sans Frontières Spain
18. Norwegian Refugee Council
19. Oxfam Novib
20. Première Urgence International
21. Terre des hommes Lausanne
22. International Rescue Committee
23. WeWorld
24. World Vision International
25. Relief International
26. AVSI
27. Movement for Peace-MPDL
28. American Friends Service Committee
29. Medico International
30. Palestine Solidarity Association in Sweden
31. Defense for Children International
32. Medical Aid for Palestinians UK
33. Caritas Internationalis
34. Caritas Jerusalem
35. Near East Council of Churches
36. Oxfam Quebec
37. War Child Holland

== Opposition ==
A "majority of basic needs are covered by international organisations". The US and Israel had attempted to directly run an organization, the Gaza Humanitarian Foundation (which existed for less than a year), where aid seekers had been killed.

Organizations have raised concerns of the impact on "exhausted local staff". Concerns were also raised because of EU data protection laws and concerns that aid workers would be targeted by Israel. Israel has "failed to confirm" data collected would not be used for targeting aid workers. The rule has been alleged to violate humanitarian principles "specifically neutrality and independence".

A joint statement from the foreign ministers of Canada, Denmark, Finland, France, Iceland, Japan, Norway, Sweden, Switzerland and the United Kingdom expressed:

Firstly, ensure that international NGOs are able to operate in Gaza in a sustained and predictable way. As 31 December approaches, many established international NGO partners are at risk of being deregistered because of the Government of Israel’s restrictive new requirements. Deregistration could result in the forced closure of INGO operations within 60 days in Gaza and the West Bank. This would have a severe impact on access to essential services including healthcare. 1 in 3 healthcare facilities in Gaza will close if INGOs operations are stopped. INGOs are integral to the humanitarian response and - working with the UN and Palestinian organisations - collectively deliver approximately $1 billion in aid across Palestine each year. Any attempt to stem their ability to operate is unacceptable. Without them, it will be impossible to meet all urgent needs at the scale required.

The statement also called for lifting restrictions on items that are dual use including generators and tent poles.

UN "experts" including George Katrougalos, Ashwini K.P., Paula Gaviria Betancur, Elisa Morgera, Irene Khan, Tlaleng Mofokeng, Farida Shaheed, Michael Fakhri, Heba Hagrass, Gina Romero, Francesca Albanese, Siobhán Mullally, Reem Alsalem, Bina D'Costa, Ana Brian Nougreres, Astrid Puentes Riaño, and Attiya Waris said "The ban is not an isolated act, but part of a systematic assault on humanitarian operations in the occupied Palestinian territory and another step in the deliberate dismantling of Gaza’s lifeline (...) These measures must be seen in legal and factual context: as a strategy to create conditions in Gaza that force Palestinians into chronic deprivation, threatening their survival as a group and further violating the Genocide Convention (...) It is unacceptable for a State accused of international crimes and maintaining an unlawful occupation to block access to life-saving aid in occupied territory."

Médecins Sans Frontières said is a statement that Israel's actions are "a cynical and calculated attempt to prevent organisations from providing services in Gaza and the West Bank, Palestine, in breach of Israel's obligations under international humanitarian law."

== Related actions ==
Israel has considered a 80% tax on foreign NGOs to prevent "foreign interference" and preventing foreign NGOs from Israeli courts.

== See also ==
- Humanitarian aid during the Gaza war
- International aid to Palestinians
- UNRWA and Israel
