= Malaysia–Myanmar relations =

- Malaysia: Myanmar

Malaysia–Myanmar relations are foreign relations between Malaysia and Myanmar. Both are members of ASEAN and enjoy good relations.⁣ Although the relations became strained in late 2016 due to the Rohingya people issues, the relations remained stable after the meeting between both countries' armed forces chiefs to play down the issues.⁣ Myanmar currently has an embassy in Kuala Lumpur. and Malaysia has an embassy in Yangon.⁣

== History ==
Formal relations between the two countries were established on 1 March 1957, and the first Burma mission at the legation level was set up in Kuala Lumpur in June 1959 and later raised to the embassy level. Prior to 1988, Malaysia–Myanmar relations were friendly and were further consolidated during the administration of Tun Razak, largely due to the latter's personal dealings with Myanmar's stalwart, General Ne Win. However, the passing of Tun Razak marks a change in the closeness of the relationship.

One of the reasons is that Malaysia has placed greater emphasis on ASEAN and its relations with ASEAN member states. Myanmar's policy of self-imposed isolation, its shift to socialism after 1974, and the establishment of close relations with socialist countries may have been another reason why Malaysia began to "distance" itself from Myanmar. Relations between Malaysia and Myanmar were at their lowest point in the late 1970s and most of the 1980s. In the late 1980s and early 1990s, Myanmar ended its policy of self-imposed isolation, declared the end of the socialist system, and began an open-door policy in 1989, opening up its long-closed economy to foreign business. As a result, most countries, including Malaysia, began to look for economic opportunities in Myanmar. In this context, Malaysia re-emphasised its relationship with Myanmar during Mahathir's tenure, and the two countries re-established close ties after almost a decade of diminished contact. Moreover, Myanmar has much to learn from Malaysia in terms of economic development after almost three decades of economic closure. Former Malaysian Prime Minister Tun Mahathir has made several visits to Myanmar, actively promoted Myanmar's accession to ASEAN in 1997, and has been involved in the country's economy in terms of trade, investment, and national oil considerations.

Since 2003, with the deteriorating human rights situation and slow pace of political change in the country, Malaysia has distanced itself from the military government and has gradually made a number of criticisms of the country and publicly expressed its dissatisfaction with the failure of the military government to promote political change in the country. In terms of foreign investment, however, Malaysia remains the fourth largest investor in Myanmar, with investments concentrated in the oil and gas and real estate sectors.

== Economic relations ==
From 2011 to 2012, the total of Myanmar exports to Malaysia was worth over US$152.038 million, while the imports from Malaysia during the same year were worth over US$303.410 million, and the total trade reached US$455.448 million. Myanmar's ten main export items to Malaysia were rubber, fish, prawns, sesame, clothes, timber, tamarind, green gram, pigeon peas, and corn, while its ten main import items from Malaysia were oil, raw plastic ware, petroleum and chemical products, metal construction appliances, wires, medical products, electrical and electronic machinery, mechanical appliances, and crop oil. Besides that, Myanmar needs more investment from other countries, such as Malaysia, to develop the country's economy. In 2017, a memorandum of understanding (MoU) in a healthcare deal was signed by the Malaysia Healthcare Travel Council (MHTC) to promote healthcare services to Myanmar citizens in Malaysia, which will also encourage knowledge and skill transfer between doctors of the two countries.⁣

== Rohingya refugee issues ==
Following the Rakhine State riots since 2012, thousands of Rohingya people have been in exodus from Myanmar, and this sparked the Rohingya refugee crisis in 2015 to Myanmar's neighbouring countries.

=== Malaysia protest to Myanmar ===
Due to the unstoppable human exodus from Myanmar until 2016, which has also since affected Malaysia, Prime Minister Najib Razak decided to join a rally to the Myanmar embassy with the protestors gathered in Titiwangsa Stadium of Kuala Lumpur. The event was organised by Malay Muslim groups, political parties, and non-governmental organisations (NGOs) on 4 December to urge Myanmar to stop what has been labelled by Malaysia as a "genocide of Muslims as well as its minority people" and to call on the international community to put pressure on Myanmar. During the rally, Prime Minister Najib Razak said:

What do they want me to do as head of government of 31 million people? Want me to close my eyes? Keep my mouth shut? I will not. We must defend them (Rohingyas), not just because they are of the same faith, but they are humans, their lives have value. This Rohingya issue is an insult to Islam. Our patience is being challenged. I would call on Indonesian president Joko Widodo to also lead the world's largest Muslim country in protest against the treatment of the Rohingya.

Prime Minister Najib Razak mocked the Myanmar winner Aung San Suu Kyi for her inaction over the issues, as well as issuing a response via Twitter in which he stated that "it was not my intention to interfere in Myanmar's internal affairs, but the cruelty against Rohingya had gone too far".

The Malaysian side also cancelled two friendly football matches of their U-22 team with Myanmar U-23 as well as previously threatening to pull out their team from the 2016 AFF Championship to protest Myanmar as a Group B host, where Malaysia was placed in the same group after persistent calls from the country's Muslim individuals, groups, and political parties to boycott Myanmar for their alleged persecution of the Rohingya people.

Despite various questions and conspiracies arising from the Malaysian public, the Malaysian Foreign Affairs Ministry views the recent rally joined by the Malaysian Prime Minister as legal due to the spillover effects, which became a security concern for Malaysia with the continuous arrival of Rohingya refugees from Myanmar, and explained that the matter is "not just about religious issues but humanitarian concerns".

The Federation of Malaysian Manufacturers (FMM) said earlier, following the decision of the Myanmar government to halt its workers prior to the ongoing issues, the move will affect Malaysian industry. However, this was denied by the Malaysian deputy human resources minister, as they can look up other sources of labour from other countries.

=== Myanmar reactions to the protest ===
As a reaction, Myanmar nationalists, led by activist and monk Sayadaw Pamaukkha, began to protest against the Malaysian Prime Minister's decision to join the rally. They suggested that Malaysia should "take all Rohingya people in their country and integrate them into the Malaysian society if they (the Malaysians) love the Rohingya so much, as we, the Myanmar people, don't want our race, religion, and nation to disappear due to the fast growth of the Rohingya population" (with Myanmar's previous junta administration labelling the Rohingya as immigrants from Bangladesh, especially during Operation King Dragon, with many claimed to be insurgents and illegal immigrants who fled from the Bangladesh Liberation War). The group also reminded Myanmar citizens in Malaysia to be careful, as some extreme groups and NGOs in the country have been inciting hatred of Malaysians to hate Myanmar people, adding that "they would organise a similar protest in their country to condemn the Malaysian action but not burn the Malaysian flag as had been done by some of the Malaysian protesters to the Myanmar flag in a recent rally." Earlier, before the Malaysian prime minister joined the rally, Myanmar President's Office Deputy Director and Spokesman for Myanmar President Htin Kyaw, Zaw Htay, urged Malaysia to "respect their sovereign affairs and to stop interfering in their country's affairs".

Zaw Htay has announced that the Government of Myanmar would issue an official response objecting to the Malaysian prime minister's participation in the rally and said, "Our new government is working on a solution to the Rohingya issues, and I want to say again that the Malaysian government should respect the ASEAN charter". Adding that the rally that was supported by the Malaysian leader "could stoke religious extremism and amounted to vote-seeking ahead of a Malaysian election expected soon", as well as criticising Malaysian media for giving a biased report and playing up the Rohingya issues. The Malaysian ambassador to Myanmar was summoned previously since the Malaysian government raised their concern on the issues, although Myanmar did not yet issue any instructions on a change to diplomatic posture with Malaysia. As a condemnation of the Malaysian prime minister's action, Myanmar protesters gather in Mahabandoola Park of Yangon on 5 December. The Myanmar National Monk Union also released a statement that:

We will do everything we can, either protesting or sending out signed requests, because we do not want to give even an inch of our country and we cannot accept the fact that they (the Rohingya) insult our nationality, so even if we need to take up arms, we might do so.

With other monk members issuing a letter:

The unfair fact is Muslim countries are using a lot of money and unfair techniques and bullying the country of Myanmar to make the world become a Muslim world.

And another Myanmar protest leader rejecting international pressure on Myanmar as suggested by the Malaysian prime minister. In a statement, he said:

The Malaysian prime minister is pressuring the Myanmar government. I would like to tell the Malaysian prime minister, don't stand for terrorists. You must know the correct history of Myanmar. I would like to announce to the world that there are 135 Myanmar ethnic groups and there is no Rohingya.

Advisor to former president Thein Sein, Ko Ko Hlaing accused the Malaysian prime minister of exploiting the issue to divert public attention away from corruption allegations levelled against him.

While the Myanmar Committee for the Protection of Race and Religion of Ma Ba Tha slammed the Malaysian prime minister's action for meddling and "insulting Myanmar and Aung San Suu Kyi's handling of the affairs", the group leaders said a letter will be translated and delivered to the Malaysian embassy in Yangon. A Myanmar journalist also explained that Suu Kyi is not ignoring the Rohingya plight, as has been accused by Najib, but the new administration, especially with her limited powers, as well as many other Myanmar internal issues, has hardened the process much more when Rakhine State politicians continue to disapprove of the attempts of the State Counsellor (headed by Suu Kyi) to the situation.

Prior to the ongoing issues with Malaysia, especially due to the demonstrations against Myanmar, the Myanmar Labour Department indefinitely suspended sending migrant workers to the country beginning on 7 December. Until 5 May 2017, there was still no green light from the Myanmar side to allow their workers to go to Malaysia, as there are many reported cases where Myanmar workers have been killed in Malaysia.⁣ although traffickers continue to smuggle Myanmar workers to the country.

=== Views from other Malaysian public, experts and United Nations rapporteur on the issues ===
Earlier in October 2016, the Malaysian Malay newspaper Harian Metro reported on the behaviour of Rohingya in Malaysia who had been using government land without permission, operating businesses without licenses, and using public parking spaces like their own land for their business storage, with the activities having been ongoing for more than 10 years without any action from the Malaysian local administration government. The behaviour of Rohingya immigrants and asylum seekers was heavily criticised by many of the Malaysians public especially from the majority Malays with some commenting the news release in Facebook as "no wonder they been discriminated in Myanmar with this kind of behaviour", with other chided the situation as "a result from religious organisations inside the country who like to urged the government to take every Muslim refugees from war-torn countries just because of the same religion and under the excuse of humanity without checking the background of those refugees first" as well some said that "this country will soon be overtaken by these refugees and we will become a minority in our own land although they have the same religion with us". Thailand-based expert on ASEAN affairs, Kavi Chongkittavorn, describes the Malaysian prime minister's actions "as an attempt to gain support from his country's Muslim community and that his concern could be more effectively registered through discreet diplomacy than openly be made, as the Myanmar government will be held to consequences for what is happening after the accusations by the Malaysian leader, as the issue is an internal problem that has regional implications". United Nations Special Rapporteur on the rights to freedom of peaceful assembly and of association from Kenya, Maina Kiai, lauded the Malaysian government's efforts to fight for the marginalised Rohingya community but reminded the government to look to their own minority groups first, who have been discriminated against in the country, before trying to look up to other countries issues.

The Malaysian government's sincerity is also being questioned by reporters in their own country for their sudden help, as previously Malaysian authorities were seen rejecting the Rohingya from setting foot on Malaysian soil while their boat was drifting in the sea after escaping from Myanmar. In addition, the poor condition of the already available Rohingya in Malaysia, with most of them unable to study or send their children to school, no access to healthcare, and their new children who were born in the country being unregistered, unable to work legally, and vulnerable to exploitation by unscrupulous employers, as Malaysia is not a signatory to the 1951 Refugee Convention, has mostly been criticised by journalists and non-governmental organisations in the country. The government has also been alleged to be biased, as they are "only selecting discriminated people who are Muslims, as if they are not Muslims the government will not care about them at all. This has been exemplified by the Vietnamese boat people incident, where they were only put on Bidong Island and shooed away, as the Vietnamese looked more like Chinese and not Muslim. The Malaysian deputy prime minister at the time, Mahathir Mohamad, threatened to use force to shoot them if they continuously reached Malaysian shores, as Mahathir worried the increase of the non-Muslim population in Malaysia would threaten the majority Malay and Muslim population. The Malaysian government has also been alleged to be trying to make the Rohingya part of Malaysian citizens to use them to vote for the ruling party for the next Malaysian general election. This has been exemplified by the Moro Muslim refugees in the state of Sabah, who fled the political uncertainty in the Philippines in the 1970s when they were registered as citizens and used as voters to topple the state government, which was Christian at the time, and to maintain the ruling Muslim party to administer the state.

The issues of Rohingya refugees test Malaysia's chairmanship of ASEAN, as previously Malaysia, together with Indonesia and Thailand, rejected boats carrying Rohingya asylum seekers from reaching their shores, mainly due to domestic concerns about illegal immigrants. But with the criticism from United Nations human rights chief Zeid Ra'ad al-Hussein to the three countries for turning away the asylum seekers, the Malaysian and Indonesian leaders decide to hold a meeting where the two finally agreed to provide temporary shelter for the Rohingya under "humanitarian concerns" under a term that the international community should assist to repatriate and resettle these refugees to other third world countries soon as Malaysia is not a signatory to the 1951 Refugee Convention with the United Nations been told not to use Malaysia's compassion to allowing more refugees to seek shelter in the country as it is also against the long-term solution for Malaysia to repatriate illegal immigrants in the country. Furthermore, the ethnic conflicts and violence between Myanmar ethnic groups brought by the asylum seekers have threatened the safety of Malaysian citizens in their own homeland. The continuous acceptance of Muslim refugees from unstable countries under the excuse of "humanitarian concerns and religious sympathy", especially during the Mahathir administration of strong Islamic foreign policy that was continued until this day by Najib, received backlash from the Malaysian general public, as this has been perceived as the government putting more priority on foreigners than on its own suffering citizens, especially with the rampant crimes and social problems committed by the asylum seekers in Malaysia.

=== Attempts to play down the issues ===
The Malaysian government then sent the Malaysian Armed Forces chief to meet the Myanmar Tatmadaw chief and Myanmar president to repair the already "fraught relations between the two countries as a result of the Rohingya issues", with the Myanmar President's Office describing the strained relations as a result of "false news". In response to the ongoing disagreement between both countries, a group of Muslim organisations in Myanmar sent an open letter to the Malaysian government expressing their disapproval of the country's response, stating, "That is doing more harm than good for Muslim people in Myanmar". The letter reads:

We affirm that the unfortunate situation facing Myanmar needs not, and should not, be exploited for self-interest and political purpose.

Malaysia's Foreign Minister Anifah Aman has prepared to meet Myanmar's State Counsellor Aung San Suu Kyi to determine how it can assist to help Myanmar to stop the continuous violence, as Myanmar previously has called on other ASEAN countries to participate in the recent developments in their country, including Rakhine State, where the Rohingya are located, following Myanmar's participation in the ASEAN foreign ministers meeting led by Malaysia. Earlier, Malaysia's Foreign Ministry propose to hold an emergency meeting relating about the Rohingya in Laos but were rejected by the country. The Malaysian Foreign Deputy Minister also clarified that despite the issues, the relations between the two countries are still normal.

== Myanmar civil war ==
Since 1948, Myanmar has been experiencing a civil war. The conflict escalated significantly following the military coup in February 2021. The military government has been facing resistance from a broad coalition of armed groups, including ethnic minority militias and anti-coup forces.

The conflict has resulted in widespread violence, displacement of civilians, and human rights abuses. The situation remains volatile, with fighting occurring in various parts of the country.

=== Refugee influx ===
Malaysia has experienced a significant influx of Rohingya refugees fleeing the violence in Myanmar. This has placed a strain on the country's resources and social services, as the government has had to provide shelter, food, and healthcare to these refugees.

=== Security concerns ===
The conflict in Myanmar has raised security concerns for Malaysia, as there is a risk of cross-border violence and increased criminal activity. The presence of refugees and the potential for radicalisation have also been areas of concern.

=== Economic impact ===
The instability in Myanmar has affected Malaysia's economic interests. Trade and investment with Myanmar have been disrupted, and the conflict has created uncertainty for businesses operating in the region.

=== Diplomatic challenges ===
Malaysia has faced diplomatic challenges in dealing with the crisis in Myanmar. The country has sought to balance its humanitarian concerns with its diplomatic relations with Myanmar and other ASEAN members.

=== Social and cultural impacts ===
The influx of refugees has had social and cultural impacts on Malaysia. The presence of a large refugee population has raised issues of integration and cultural diversity.⁣

Overall, the civil war in Myanmar has had a significant impact on Malaysia, both in terms of humanitarian, security, economic, and diplomatic challenges. The conflict has highlighted the interconnectedness of the countries in the region and the importance of regional cooperation in addressing such crises.

== See also ==
- Burmese in Malaysia
- Burmese Malays
