= Disability in France =

Approximately 12 million French citizens are affected by disability. The history of disability activism in France dates back to the French Revolution when the national obligation to help disabled citizens was recognized, but it was "unclear whether or not such assistance should be public or private." Disabled civilians began to form the first associations to demand equal rights and integration in the workforce after the First World War. Between 1940 and 1945, 45,000 people with intellectual disabilities died from neglect in French psychiatric asylums. After the Second World War, parents of disabled children and charities created specialized institutions for disabled children for whom school was not accessible. In 2018, the French Government began to roll out a disability policy which aimed to increase the allowance for disabled adults to €900 per month, improve the digital accessibility of public services, and develop easy-to-read and understand language among other goals.

Édouard Manet, "The Rue Mosnier with Flags" (1878); a street scene with multiple French flags; a disabled figure (an amputee using crutches) is featured prominently.

== Demographics ==
According to the Institut national de la statistique et des études économiques (National Institute of Statistics and Economic Studies), in 2007 there were 9.6 million disabled people living in France. In 2023, 140,000 people with disabilities aged 16 and older are living in specialized institutions.

== Definition ==
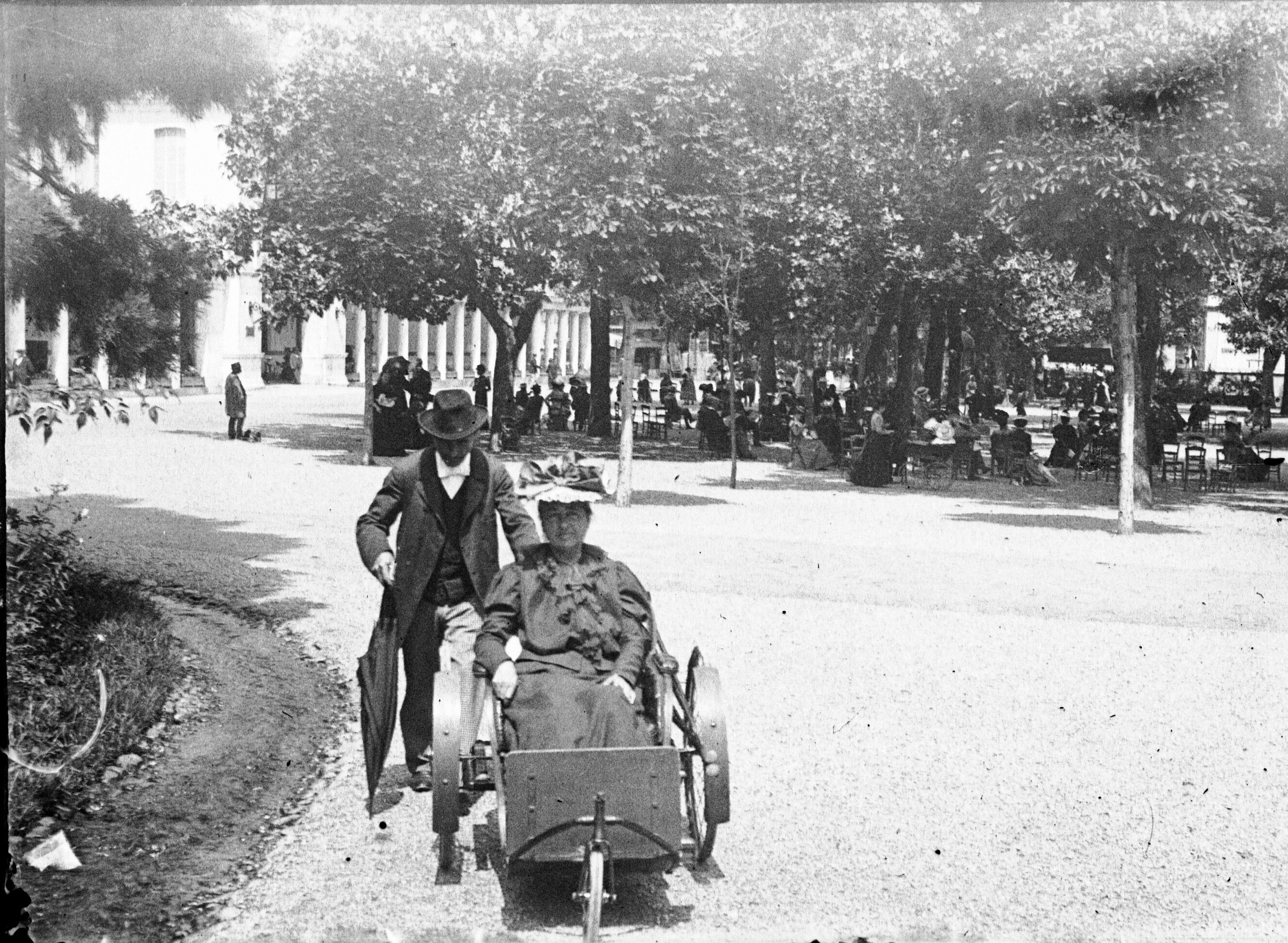
"Mme Gardriol en chaise, Luchon" (9 juillet 1899), from the Bibliothèque de Toulouse; French spa towns like Bagnères-de-Luchon have a long history of accommodating people with some disabilities.

Disability is defined in article 114 of the Disability Law 2005 as "any limitations in participating in society because of a substantial, permanent condition affecting a person's physical, sensory or mental functioning, which includes cognitive and psychiatric disorders and disabling chronic illnesses". The United Nations (UN) has requested that France updates its legal definition of disability as it does not take into account society's limitations through the human rights-based approach to disability.

== Policy and legislation ==
France ratified the Convention on the Rights of Persons with Disabilities (CRPD) in 2010.

When he was elected in May 2017, the President of France, Emmanuel Macron, declared that disability would be a priority of his five-year term of office.

=== United Nations reports on France ===
France has been the subject of much criticism for its use of the medical approach to disability rather than the human rights-based approach as set out in the CRPD., and the persistent use of psychoanalysis in the treatment of autism.

The United Nations (UN) condemned France in 2015 for placing a 16-year-old autistic boy in a psychiatric hospital without his or his mother's consent. This type of institutionalization, which took place a few days after the teenager was sent to an institut médicoéducatif (IME), is considered a deprivation of freedom and a violation of his security under international law. On 4 February 2016, the UN further expressed its concern regarding cases of ill-treatment of children with disabilities in institutions and the lack of independent monitoring of such institutions. It was also concerned that the "packing" technique (wrapping a child in cold, wet sheets), which amounts to ill‑treatment, has not been legally prohibited in France, even though it was banned by the health authorities, and was reportedly still being practiced on some children with autistic spectrum disorders.

In 2017, the UN special rapporteur, Catalina Devandas Aguilar, visited France from 3 to 17 October. She observed that France's legislation, particularly the 2005 disability law as well as the law on mental health, were not in alignment with the CRPD, notably Article 12 (legal capacity). She called for legislative authorities to undertake a comprehensive review of the entire legal framework in order to complete the process of legal harmonization, in accordance with Article 4 (general obligations) of the convention. Ms. Devandas noted that France had failed to implement and take into account the change of paradigm required by the convention, and the majority of officials she had met with during her trip to France had not been aware of the changes brought about by the CRPD, solely referring to the local 2005 law. She was also concerned with France's approach to institutionalization which runs contrary to the CRPD and the goal of social inclusion. The Committee noted in their report that children with disabilities enrolled in mainstream schools "face multiple barriers to access education on an equal basis with others. This is not only due to the lack of accessible infrastructure, but also because there is no specialized training for regular teachers and school assistants, and no curricular adaptations and accommodation in the classrooms, which affects the quality of education." She expressed "grave concern" about the situation of around 81,000 children placed in segregated medico-educative institutions, recommending that France shut them down and transform them into non-residential resource centers. "Even more worrisome, according to unofficial estimates, there are reportedly some 12,000 so-called 'children without a solution' in France, and up to 40,000 autistic students, who receive no education at all."

In 2021, the UN visited France again, and Jonas Ruskus, UN special rapporteur for disability rights, raised the same concerns about France's medical approach to disability, issues related to consent, and the education of children with disabilities. The crux of the problem remained the 2005 law on disability which was still not harmonized with the CRPD and which sets out the medical model, particularly Article 1 of the 2005 law, which creates confusion between medical associations and organizations of persons with disabilities. This leads to systemic discrimination against persons with disabilities and to a conflict of interest since these medical associations also run and manage institutions. Mr Ruskus stated that he was disappointed to see such high levels of structural discrimination in France regarding people with disabilities "expressing doubt that the French motto of Liberté, Égalité, Fraternité was really applied to people with disabilities."

In 2022, the UN wrote a letter to France expressing its concern of threats of intimidation towards a special educator in an institut médicoéducatif (institution for children with intellectual disabilities), Olivier Paolini. He stated that the institution did not adhere to the minimum requirements of schooling as it did not deem it important. As no official reply was provided by the French government, the UN made the letter public.

During its examination of the rights of children in France, in April 2023, the UN reminded France of the "very large" work it needed to do to ensure the rights of disabled children. Those children "without a solution" were of particular concern as well as those living in Belgium, many kilometers away from their families. It remains concerned at the high levels of children institutionalized and the discrimination children with disabilities face in mainstream schools. The committee also deplored the fact that the average autism diagnosis in the country is too late, on average at 7 years old.

=== Council of Europe decision ===
On 17 April 2023, the Council of Europe unanimously ruled that France had violated four articles (11.1, 15.1, 15.3, and 16) of the European Committee of Social Rights (ECSR) charter on disabled people. Inaccessibility, lack of education opportunities and lack of access to healthcare were the main areas of concern. The Council noted that many people with disabilities and their families live in precarious financial situations due to the barriers they face.

=== Social Security Law ===
Allocation d'éducation de l'enfant handicapé (disabled children's education allowance) is paid to the parents or guardians of some children with disabilities. To be eligible, the child must be under the age of 20 and:

- Assessed as being as at least 80% disabled or
- Assessed as being between 50 and 79% disabled and require specialist equipment or support at school
- Not resides at a medico-social institution where the cost is covered by the state or health insurance

== Education ==
=== Mainstream education ===
In 2022, over 430,000 children with disabilities attended mainstream schools, with or without one-on-one or mutualized aid, and/or with technical or other adaptations. Some of these students may be a part of Unités localisées pour l'inclusion scolaire (ULIS) of which there were 10,272 in 2022. Both mainstream classes and ULIS are run by the Education Ministry.

==== Mainstream classroom ====
The conditions to attend a mainstream class, in both primary and secondary education, depend on the seriousness of the disability.

==== Localized Units for School Inclusion (ULIS) ====
The ULIS program allows children with disabilities to learn at their own pace and with an adapted curriculum in a group of around 12 students. The amount of classes or activities that are to be attended in the mainstream classroom depends on the student's personalized plan.

=== Medical-social institutions ===
If a child or young adult cannot attend a mainstream school, they will be redirected toward a medical-social institution, such as an institut médicoéducatif for children with intellectual disabilities aged 3 to 20 years old, where they can also get different types of therapy based on their disability. Medical-social institutions are run by the Health Ministry, financed by French Social Security and managed by private parent associations or charities, such as the French Red Cross.

==== Cooperation with mainstream schools ====
During the 2022–2023 school year, there were around 203 teams from the medical-social sector that can be mobilized to support children with disabilities in mainstream schools.

Since 2018, the national strategy for autism has created 180 nursery school autism classes and 90 primary school autism classes within mainstream schools. These classes are contained and are part of the medical-social sector.

== Employment ==
The three leading pieces of legislation for disabled workers in France are; The French Labour Law ("Code du Travail"), the 1987 Disability Employment Act ("Loi n° 87-517 du 10 juillet 1987 en faveur de l'emploi des travailleurs handicapés") and The 2005 Disability Act ("Loi numero 2005-102 du 11 février 2005 pour l'égalité des droits et des chances, la participation et la citoyenneté des personnes handicapées"). The Employment of Disabled Workers Act 1987 outlined a quota system for the employment of disabled persons. It stipulated that any company with a workforce of more than 20 employees must ensure that at least 6% of their personnel are disabled workers.

Quota objectives are achieved by a combination of sanction and incentive: employers evade paying the penalty as far as possible and are encouraged to recruit and retain people with disabilities through the prospect of financial support. Evidence suggests that many employers prefer to pay the contribution rather than consider employing a person with a disability. EU SILC data for 2009, compiled by ANED, illustrated that the employment rate for disabled people (aged 20–64) in France was 49.8%, in comparison to 72.1% for non-disabled people (51.5% for disabled men and 48.4% for disabled women)

=== Sheltered workshops ===
Sheltered workshops (Établissement(s) et service(s) d'accompagnement par le travail - ESAT) are run by the Health Ministry. According to a report by the French Senate in 2023, sheltered workshops act as a safety net allowing people with disabilities to "have both a professional and social life". Only 3,1% of the private sector in France hires people with disabilities. Public policy for disability was late to arrive in France which meant that before the 1970s, it was up to private individuals in the form of associations and charities to organize themselves. The current structure of sheltered workshops falls under the Disability Law of 2005. Sheltered workshops in France fall under the medical-social sector and employment law does not apply (as of 2023).

=== Adapted enterprises ===
Adapted enterprises (entreprises adaptées) are companies in the private sector which hire up to 55% of disabled people to help with their production. In order to become an adapted enterprise, an agreement must be made with local authorities. These companies can receive several types of financial aids per disabled person employed. Employees of adapted enterprises fall under employment law and have temporary contracts.

== Disability culture ==
=== Arts ===
There are a few regular disability arts events in France.

- Art et Décirure (French: Art et Déchirure) is a multi-arts festival featuring artists and performers with mental illness. It is held annually since 1988 in Rouen, Normandy.
- Clin d'œil is biannual sign language arts festival hosted in Reims since 2003.

=== Sport ===
France participated in the inaugural Paralympic Games in 1960 in Rome, and has taken part in every edition of the Summer and Winter Paralympics since then. France was the host country of the 1992 Winter Paralympics.

Eugène Rubens-Alcais introduced the Deaflympics in 1924 in Paris. France has competed in every Deaflympics.

== Autism ==
According to French parent groups and associations, France is "50 years behind" when it comes to the treatment of autism. A long-held belief in autism being a psychosis and the reliance on Freudian psychoanalysis as an adequate form of treatment has meant that many autistic children go undiagnosed or are placed in psychiatric hospitals; some are even taken away from their parents.

In 2011, Le Mur (in English, The Wall), a documentary film by Sophie Robert about the use of psychoanalysis to treat autism in France, was the subject of a court case. The film argues that while the rest of the world considered autism as a neuro-developmental disorder, in France the sector remained dominated by psychoanalysis, which sees autism as a psychosis caused by difficulties in relationships and ultimately caused by the actions of the mother (see: Refrigerator Mother Theory). Therapy often consists of mother-child psychotherapy sessions with the goal of fixing said relationship. Three of the psychoanalysts featured in the film sued Ms Robert and won their case; the film was banned. The following year, in 2012, the court of appeal overturned the ruling.

In 2012, the French High Health Authority (Haute autorité de santé) publicly stated that psychoanalysis and the use of institutional psychotherapy are not consensual forms of treatment of autism. The same year, an article was published by Le Monde newspaper by Yehezkel Ben-Ari, a neurobiologist, Nouchine Hadjikhani, a neuroscientist and Eric Lemonnier, a child psychiatrist, denouncing the use of psychoanalysis in the treatment of autism due to the lack of scientific evidence of its efficacy.

The United Nations got involved in the case of a 16-year-old boy, Timothée D., who has autism. In 2016, they condemned his placement in a psychiatric hospital where his mother was prohibited from seeing him (after a few days spent in an institut médicoéducatif where he was redirected after having spent his entire schooling in mainstream school, and after a European arrest warrant was filed after the family had fled to Ireland). The special rapporteur for the rights of people with disabilities, Catalina Devandas-Alguilar, stated: "The institutionalization of Timothée D. in a psychiatric unit is a serious violation of the right of freedom and security, and with respect to his physical and mental health." The rapporteur on the right to health, Dainius Pûras, reiterated the statement.

The same year, the UN stated in its report of France that autistic children "continue to be subjected to widespread violations of their rights". They condemned the use of "packing" (wrapping cold, wet sheets around an individual during a psychotic episode) which is considered as ill-treatment. Although packing has been banned since 2012 in France, it is still used to treat psychosis, with some studies on packing continuing.

In 2017, the 'Rachel Case' was a high-profile court battle of an autistic mother whose children who also have autism were removed from her and placed in foster homes. Several associations launched petitions who claim the lack of understanding of autism by authorities is to blame.

The University of Cambridge argued in an article entitled "Psychoanalysis in the treatment of autism: Why is France a cultural outlier?" from December 2020, that French supporters of psychoanalysis say it is a matter of cultural preference. However, the authors of the article state that psychoanalysis in France is protected from criticism by powerful educational and political networks.

If autism is suspected, it is recommended to get a diagnosis from a regional Autism Resource Centre (Centre ressource autisme) which were created in 2005. In 2022, 44,000 students with autism were enrolled in mainstream schools.

== See also ==
- Autism in France
- Eugenics in France
