= Sustainable Tourism CRC =

Australian Cooperative Research Centre

Sustainable Tourism Cooperative Research Centre
- Type: Not for profit cooperative research centre
- Industry: Sustainable tourism Ecotourism
- Headquarters: Gold Coast, Queensland, Australia
- Products: Decipher, Earthcheck, IPAT and Green Globe
- Website: Sustainable Tourism CRC

Sustainable Tourism Cooperative Research Centre (STCRC), was an Australian Cooperative Research Centre, headquartered in Gold Coast, Queensland, established by the Australian Government's Cooperative Research Centers Program to establish a competitive and dynamic sustainable tourism industry in Australia. It ceased to operate on 30 June 2010.

STCRC is a not-for-profit company owned by its industry, government and university partners. STCRC stands as the world’s largest travel and tourism research center.

== History ==
STCRC was established under the Australian Government's Cooperative Research Centres Program to underpin the development of a dynamic, internationally competitive, and sustainable tourism industry. Since its inception the STCRC has supported over 170 PhD scholars through a suite of scholarships and the provision of a Career Development Program. STCRC currently supports over 90 postgraduate students. All are of exceptional academic standard. Most hold a first class honours degree and many have also received university awards for excellence. All supplementary scholarship holders also hold an APA or university-equivalent scholarship.

== Organisational Aims ==
The STCRC's aimed to develop and manage intellectual property (IP). They claimed to deliver innovation to business, community, and government enhancing environmental, economic and social sustainability of the tourism industry.

STCRC's self-proclaimed goal was to develop Australia's long-term tourism research capacities through a postgraduate research education programme.

== Commercialisation Unit ==
The Commercialisation of STCRC research, sustainability oriented technologies and certification programs is done through EC3 Global (now called EarthCheck) which is wholly owned by the STCRC. EarthCheck provides an array of programs and services for companies, communities and other interest groups to set and achieve sustainability targets. With origins leading back to 1987, EarthCheck's research encompasses 250 tourism and environmental sustainability leaders in 16 universities. EarthCheck's influence has grown to encompass hundreds of projects, creating a strong market presence in over 50 countries.

== University Partners ==
There are currently 16 Australian universities who are partners with the STCRC, these are listed below.

- Charles Darwin University

Charles Darwin University was formed in 2003, with over 50 years' history delivering tertiary education to the Northern Territory. Charles Darwin's Main Campus is located in Darwin, Australia and is named after Charles Darwin, the English naturalist.

It was formed in 2003 through a merger between the Northern Territory University, Alice Springs-based Central College, NT Rural College in Katherine and the Menzies School of Health Research. Charles Darwin University is the largest university in the Northern Territory.

- Curtin University of Technology

Curtin University of Technology, formed in 1986, is Western Australia's largest university, with over 40,000 students presently. Curtin University has a strong emphasis on innovation and technology, the main themes of the university.

Curtin University has an important research and development history, with an annual income from research of around $12 million Australian.

- Edith Cowan University

Edith Cowan University is the second largest university in Western Australia and has approximately 23,000 students, of whom over 3,000 originate from countries outside Australia. It was established in 1991, and is the only Australian university named after a woman, Edith Dircksey Cowan.

The university specializes in the service professions, and the teaching of education is a key focus. Joint research and study with other universities and international consultancies remain an important area for the university.

- Griffith University

Griffith University is an Australian public university with five campuses in Queensland between Brisbane and the Gold Coast. As of 2008, there were more than 37,000 enrolled students and 3,500 staff. Griffith stands as one of Queensland's largest universities and holds Queensland's oldest academy.

Griffith has diverse multidisciplinary teaching and research fields, and has students and academic staff from over 120 countries throughout the world.

- James Cook University

James Cook University is a public university based in Townsville, Queensland, Australia and was proclaimed on 20 April 1970 in Townsville. It is the second oldest university in Queensland. James Cook University is listed as one of the best universities in Queensland and is one of only 17 in Australia that were listed in the ARWU top 500 academic world universities in 2007.

The main fields of research include marine sciences, biodiversity, sustainable management of tropical ecosystems, tropical health care and tourism. James Cook University receives over $23 million in research funding annually, highlighting the importance of its ongoing research projects.

- La Trobe University

La Trobe University is a multi-campus university in Victoria. La Trobe is generally considered to be ranked amongst the top ten universities in Australia and in 2005 was ranked in the top 100 universities in the world.
Presently La Trobe University has over 28,000 enrolled students and has become a well established centre for teaching, training, scholarship and research.

- Monash University

Monash University is a public university with campuses located in Australia, Malaysia and South Africa. It is Australia's largest university, with about 55,000 students.

It has a total of eight campuses, and also a centre in Prato, Italy.

- Murdoch University

Murdoch University is located in Perth, Western Australia and has three campuses at Murdoch, Rockingham and Peel. It currently has a student population of over 15,000 students including 3,000 international students.

- Southern Cross University

Southern Cross University (SCU) is based on the Mid North and North coast of New South Wales, Australia. It is a regional university with more than 14,000 students. It is the country's seventh largest provider of distance education. It also has international students from more than 50 countries. More than 700 students are enrolled on-campus and with on-shore partners in Australia, with a further 1300 enrolled in overseas programs.

- University of Canberra

The University of Canberra is the second largest university in Canberra, the capital of Australia. It was one of nine Australian universities recognized by the Australian government in 2006 for high achievement in learning and teaching. Presently it has over 10,000 students from over 80 countries, and more than 1,000 staff.

- University of New South Wales

University of New South Wales (UNSW) is one of Australia's largest research institutions.

It is a member of Australia's "Group of Eight" lobby group, and a founding member of Universitas 21, an international network of leading research-intensive universities. UNSW ranks third for both total funds allocated and the number of grants from the Australian Research Council among Australian universities following University of Sydney and Australian National University, by securing more than $26 million in Discovery Project grants. It gains the highest number of Linkage Project grants of any university.

- University of Queensland

The University of Queensland is Queensland's first university, being founded in 1909. Presently it has over 37,000 enrolled students. It is a founding member of the Group of Eight, an alliance of research-strong "sandstone" universities in Australia.

- University of South Australia

The University of South Australia is a public university in the state of South Australia. It was formed in 1991 with the merger of the South Australian Institute of Technology and Colleges of Advanced Education. It is a leading expert in technical education and applied research, as well being a founding member of the Australian Technology Network.
The university has nearly 32,000 enrolled students as of 2008.

- University of Tasmania

The University of Tasmania has three campuses in Tasmania. A 'sandstone university', it is the fourth-oldest university in Australia. It was founded on 1 January 1890, and is a member of the international Association of Commonwealth Universities.

- University of Technology, Sydney

The University of Technology, Sydney (UTS) is part of the Australian Technology Network of universities, and is the third largest university in Sydney in terms of enrolment. Founded in its current form in 1988, it is also the only university with its main campuses within the Sydney CBD.

- Victoria University

The Victoria University in Melbourne offers higher education and technical and further education (TAFE) courses. Presently there are over 45,000 enrolled students, including over 8,500 international students. Founded in 1916, it is one of Australia's older universities.

== See also ==
- EarthCheck Assessed
- Green Globe Lite
