= Elisa Morgera =

Italian professor in Scotland

- Born: 4 March 1977 (age 49); Trieste, Italy
- Education: University of Trieste, University College London and the Italian European University Institute
- Occupation: Academic
- Known for: UN Special Rapporteur on human rights and climate change
- Predecessor: Ian Fry of Tuvalu

Elisa Morgera (born 4 March 1977) is an Italian professor, working in Scotland (in 2023), who became the United Nations Special Rapporteur on human rights and climate change in 2024.

== Life ==
Morgera was born in Trieste and she graduated from her local university in law. She was unsure of her future career until she discovered environmental law while studying in Belgium as part of her first degree. This was a revelation as she thought she had chosen to ignore the environment to study law. She decided to move to environmental law and she obtained her master's degree in that subject at University College London before working for the United Nations. Her doctorate in International Law was gained at the European University Institute in Italy and she again worked for the UN.

In 2009 she joined Edinburgh University where she became the Professor of Global Environmental Law. From 2013 to 2016, she led an £800K research programme (BENELEX) to see how international law could be used to ensure that the benefits of moving to a green economy could be shared fairly. In 2015 she joined the University of Eastern Finland as an adjunct Professor of International and European Environmental Law.

Morgera has used a Transformative research model at the One Ocean Hub which was one of twelve research units funded by UK Research and Innovation. She led this group from 2019 and it involved about 100 researchers in different countries. It initially had a ten-year model from its creation in c.2018 but it was drawn to a close after its first five years. Morgera has argued that human rights can be the key to her work. In March 2024 she was chosen from 50 applicants to succeed Ian Fry as the Special Rapporteur on the promotion and protection of human rights in the context of climate change. She was chosen on the same day as several other rapporteurs including Astrid Puentes Riaño who looks at human rights and the environment and the Colombian Gina Romero who is an expert on the human rights of free association.

Morgera became a fellow of the Royal Society of Edinburgh in 2023.

In June 2025, The Guardian covered a report by Morgera in her role as UN Special Rapporteur on the promotion and protection of human rights in the context of climate change. Her report is to be considered by the UN Human Rights Council during 16 June–11 July 2025. The Guardian wrote:

[The report] argues that the US, UK, Canada, Australia and other wealthy fossil fuel nations are legally obliged under international law to fully phase out oil, gas and coal by 2030 — and compensate communities for harms caused.

== Publications include ==
- Environmental Integration in the EU's External Relations: Beyond Multilateral Dimensions, 2012 (with Gracia Marin Durán)
- Benefit-sharing for an equitable transition to the green economy - the role of Law (BENELEX), c. 2016, (Morgera et al)
- Corporate Environmental Accountability in International Law , 2020
- Fair and Equitable Benefit-sharing in International Law, 2024
