= Annalisa Ciampi =

Italian law professor and public official

United Nations Special Rapporteur on the Rights to Freedom of Peaceful Assembly and of Association
- In office 1 May 2017 – 30 November 2017
- Secretary-General: António Guterres
- Preceded by: Maina Kiai
- Succeeded by: Clément Nyaletsossi Voule

Personal details
- Born: Italy
- Education: University of Florence (J.D.); Harvard Law School (LLM); Sapienza University of Rome (Ph.D)
- Profession: Legal scholar

Annalisa Ciampi is an Italian law professor and public official. In 2017, Ciampi served as United Nations Special Rapporteur on the Rights to Freedom of Peaceful Assembly and of Association.

== Education ==
Ciampi received her Juris Doctor degree from the University of Florence and her Master of Laws (LLM) from Harvard Law School. Ciampi went on to receive a PhD in international law from the Sapienza University of Rome. Additionally, Ciampi was a Brendan Fellow at the Lautherpacht Centre for International Law in at the University of Cambridge.

== Career ==
Ciampi was a professor of international law at the University of Verona prior to her United Nations appointment. While at the University of Verona, Ciampi published an article on the impeachment proceedings against Sudanese president Omar al-Bashir in the Journal of International Criminal Justice. She was also a visiting professor of European human rights law at the Monash University Prato Centre.

On 1 May 2017, Ciampi replaced Maina Kiai as United Nations Special Rapporteur on the Rights to Freedom of Peaceful Assembly and of Association, serving until 30 November 2017. This appointment made her the first Italian to serve as a special rapporteur since Maria Grazia Giammarinaro. She was succeeded in this position in 2018 by Clément Nyaletsossi Voule.
