= Clément Nyaletsossi Voule =

Togolese diplomat & jurist

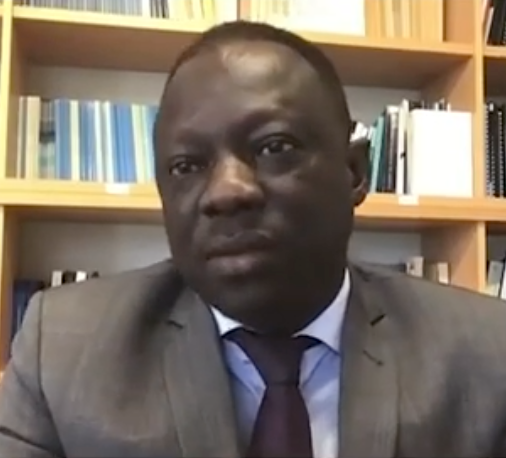
- In a UNOHCHR video in 2022

United Nations Special Rapporteur on the Rights to Freedom of Peaceful Assembly and of Association
- Incumbent
- Assumed office April 2018
- Secretary-General: António Guterres
- Preceded by: Annalisa Ciampi
- Succeeded by: Gina Romero

Personal details
- Born: Togo
- Education: Nantes University; Graduate Institute of International and Development Studies
- Profession: Diplomat, jurist

Clément Nyaletsossi Voule is a Togolese diplomat and jurist. Voule served as the United Nations Special Rapporteur on the Rights to Freedom of Peaceful Assembly and of Association from 2018 to 2024. Prior to this, Voule served as African Advocacy Director International Service for Human Rights (ISHR).

== Early life and education ==
Born and raised in Togo, Voule received his degree in fundamental rights from Nantes University in France. Voule went on to receive his master's degree in international law from the Graduate Institute of International and Development Studies.

== Human rights career ==
Voule served as Secretary-General of Amnesty International's Togo branch. Voule also served as Secretary-General of the Togolese Coalition of Human Rights Defenders. In 2011, he became an advisor to the African Commission on Human and Peoples' Rights.

Voule joined the International Service for Human Rights (ISHR) in 2006, and served as the organization's African Advocacy Director. In this capacity, Voule pushed the government of Mali, Cote d'Ivoire, Burkina Faso to enshrine human rights protections.

== United Nations ==
In 2018, Voule was selected to serve as United Nations Special Rapporteur on the Rights to Freedom of Peaceful Assembly and of Association, replacing Annalisa Ciampi. Voule is the second African to serve in this position, after inaugural holder Maina Kiai, a Kenyan national.

Voule's appointment was praised by the Community of Democracies (CoD), which stated it "look[ed] forward to supporting him in his mandate". In his first report to the U.N. Security Council, Voule identified the oppression of LGBTI people as a top human rights concern. Voule has endorsed new civil liberties protections for internet users, arguing that freedom of assembly should apply in digital spaces.

In office, Voule joined a group of experts condemning the Hong Kong national security law as "incompatible" with international human rights law. In the run-up to the 2021 Nicaraguan election, Voule urged the country's leaders to cease violations of human rights. While in his UN post, Voule remains a researcher at the Geneva Academy of International Humanitarian Law and Human Rights.

He was succeeded in 2024 as the Special Rapporteur by Gina Romero from Colombia.
