= EarthCheck =

Tourism advisory group

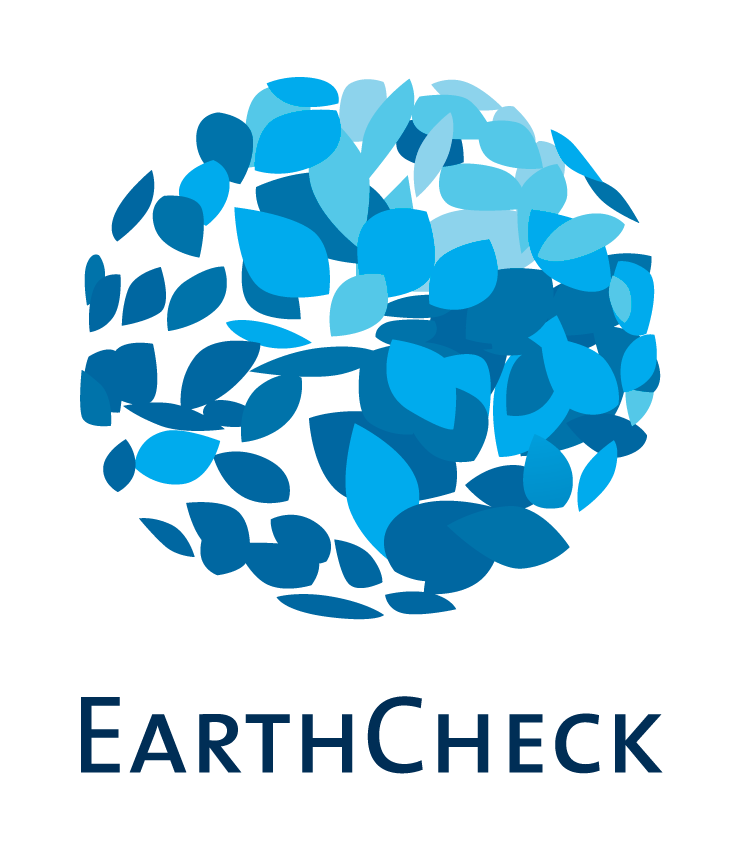
- Industry: Sustainable tourism Ecotourism
- Headquarters: Brisbane, Queensland, Australia
- Products: Training, Certification, Advice, and EarthCheck Research Institute
- Website: earthcheck.org

EarthCheck, previously operating under the name EC3 Global, is a group that works in benchmarking, certification, and advisory services. It focuses in the environmental and scientific dimensions of the travel and tourism sector. Established over 30 years ago, EarthCheck collaborates with prominent research institutions and universities globally to address sustainability and climate change challenges in tourism destinations and businesses.

== History ==
The organisation traces its roots back to Australia’s first National Centre for Studies in Travel & Tourism, established in 1987 at James Cook University. In 1997, it evolved into a part of the Sustainable Tourism Cooperative Research Centre (STCRC) through the support of the Australian Federal Government, 14 universities, and the Australian Tourism Industry. STCRC developed the EarthCheck Benchmarking Methodology for 30 sectors within the travel and visitor economy.

In 2010, the not-for-profit EarthCheck Research Institute (ERI) was established with support from academia and industry. Subsequently, in 2011, Earthcheck Pty. Limited was launched as an independent, profit-for-purpose entity. Since then, both EarthCheck and ERI have continuously adapted to the dynamic needs of the travel and tourism sector, as well as broader sustainability initiatives.

EarthCheck's principal certification program, EarthCheck Certified, is operational in over 70 countries, aiding members in achieving sustainable tourism outcomes. In 2018, the United Nations World Tourism Organization (UNWTO) acknowledged the EarthCheck Building Planning and Design Standard (BPDS) for its innovative contributions to research and technology.

== Certification programs ==
EarthCheck has sustainability certification and programs for tourism businesses, hotels, destinations, governments, developers and building designers, terrestrial and marine parks, and events.

EarthCheck Certified is a programme designed for travel and tourism businesses focusing on sustainable tourism. The programme is relevant as the industry faces increasing pressure to operate sustainably and reduce its ecological footprint. By participating in EarthCheck Certified, businesses can demonstrate their commitment to sustainable practices, such as reducing carbon emissions and conserving resources.
