= George Meany-Lane Kirkland Human Rights Award =

Meany-Kirkland Human Rights Award
- Type: Labor
- Awarded for: Human rights
- Description: Named in honor of George Meany & Lane Kirkland
- Presented by: AFL-CIO
- Established: 2000; 26 years ago
- Website: Award page

The George Meany-Lane Kirkland Human Rights Award is an award offered annually by AFL–CIO, and bears the name of the first two presidents of the entity. The award recognizes people and entities that fight for human rights in the field of labor relations.

== Recipients ==
- 2000 – Luis Eduardo Garzon
- 2001 – U Maung Maung
- 2002 – Nancy Riche
- 2003 – Wellington Chibebe
- 2004 – Mikhail Volynets
- 2005 – Ela Bhatt
- 2006 – International Federation of Journalists
- 2007 – Firestone Agricultural Workers Union of Liberia
- 2008 – Yessika Hoyos
- 2009 – Workers Movement of Egypt
- 2011 – Napoleón Gómez Urrutia
- 2012 – Arab Spring workers
- 2013 – International Domestic Workers Network
- 2014 – Building and Wood Workers' International
- 2015 – Trade Union Confederation of Swaziland
- 2016 – Maina Kiai
- 2017 – Han Sang-gyun
- 2018 – National Temporary Protected Status Alliance
- 2019 – Lula
- 2020 – Civil Human Rights Front of Hong Kong
- 2023 – Trade Union Congress of the Philippines
- 2025 – Minnesota labor movement & Belarusian Congress of Democratic Trade Unions
