= Heba Hagrass =

Egyptian parliamentarian and UN rapporteur

United Nations Special Rapporteur on the Rights of Persons with Disabilities
- Incumbent
- Assumed office November 2023
- Preceded by: Gerard Quinn

Heba Hagrass is an Egyptian sociologist. She was a member of the Egyptian House of Representatives from 2015 to 2020 and she became the United Nations Special Rapporteur on the rights of persons with disabilities in 2023.

== Life ==
Hagrass is an alumnus of the American University in Cairo. She obtained her doctorate in disabilities studies in England at the University of Leeds in 2010. In 2013 as an "Egyptian advocate for the rights of persons with disabilities in the Arab region" she was one of the signatories of an open letter calling on the United Nations to recognise the rights of people with disabilities. She played a part in drafting the United Nations' Convention on the Rights of Persons with Disabilities. She was on the International Disability Caucus which created Article 6. She represented women with disabilities.

She was the Egyptian National Council for Disability Affairs' Secretary General until 2015. In that year she became a member of the Egyptian lower house where for five years she represented people with disabilities. She was involved in drafting five new pieces of legislation on their behalf.

In November 2023 she became the Special Rapporteur on the rights of persons with disabilities. This a volunteer position and she was chosen from the applicants by the Human Rights Council. She followed Catalina Devandas Aguilar of Costa Rica and the Irish Professor Gerard Quinn who had been the first and second appointments.

During the Gaza war she spoke out on behalf of the people with disabilities in Gaza. She asked all those involved to allow people access to food, medicine and other necessary supplies citing the requirements of the Convention on the Rights of Persons with Disabilities to look after civilians irrespective of their abilities.

In March 2024 she attended the 22nd Meeting - 55th Regular Session of the Human Rights Council to report and join the dialogue. In September she made an official visit to Kyrgyzstan.
