= La Oroya =

La Oroya San Jerónimo de la Oroya
- Town
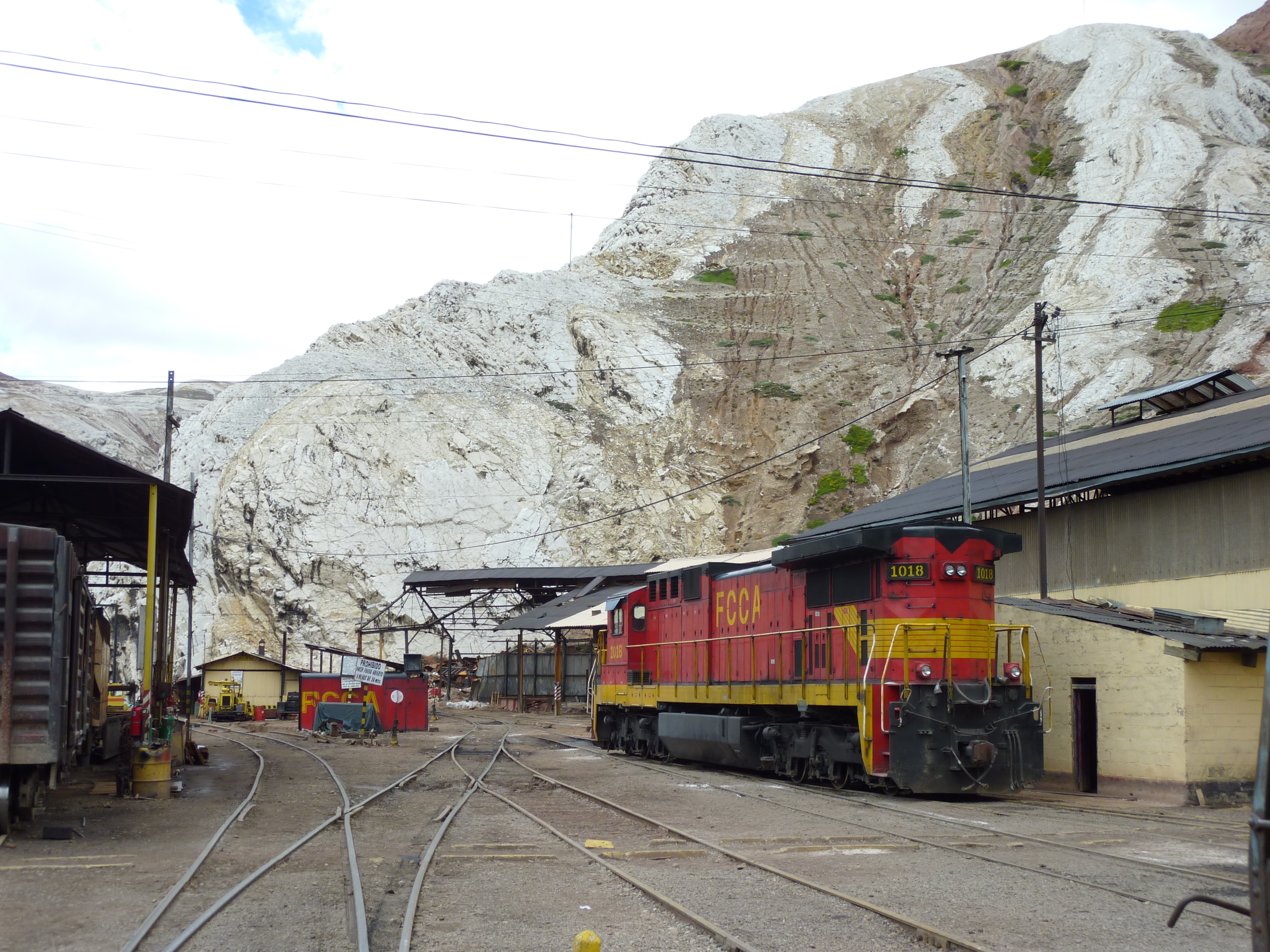
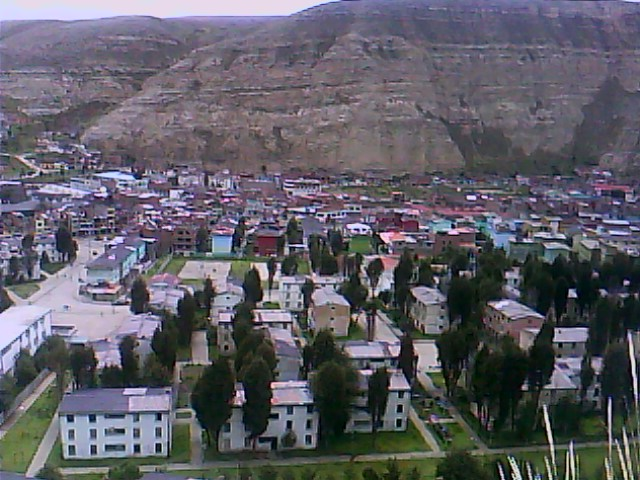
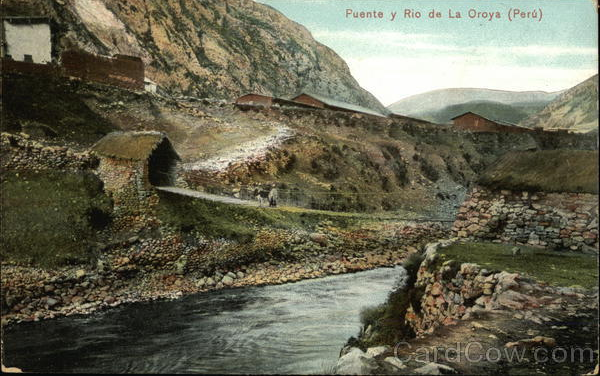
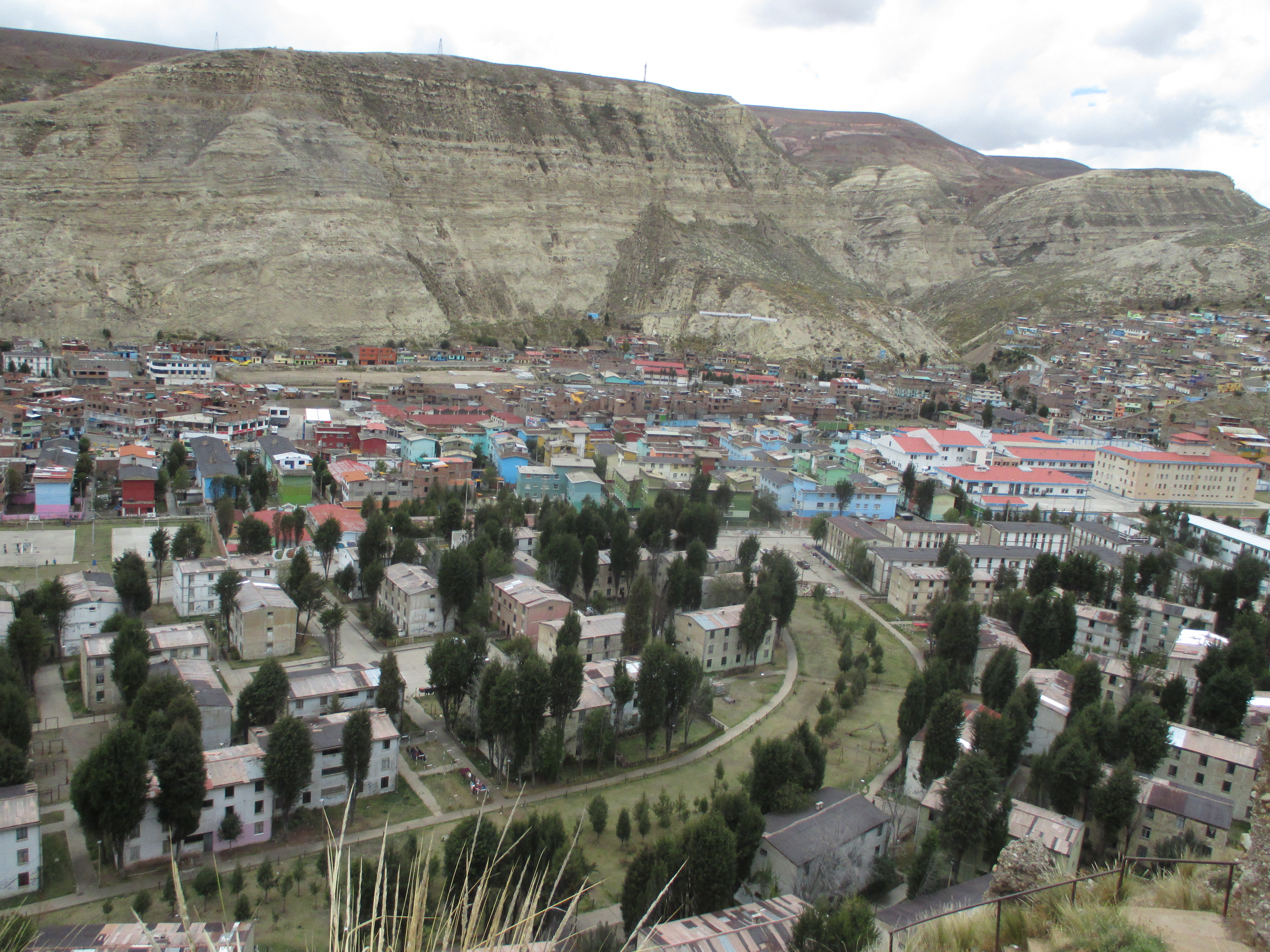
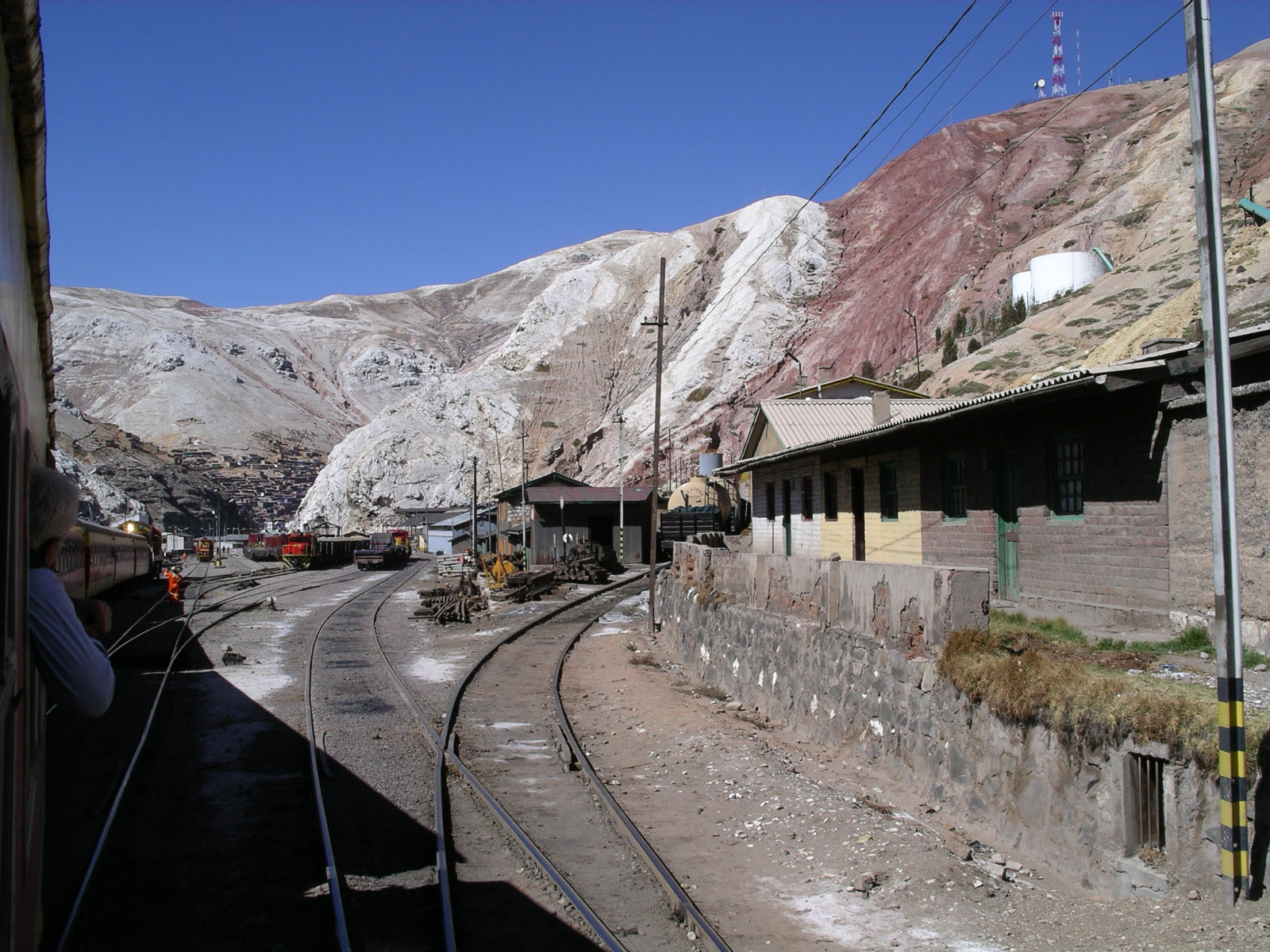
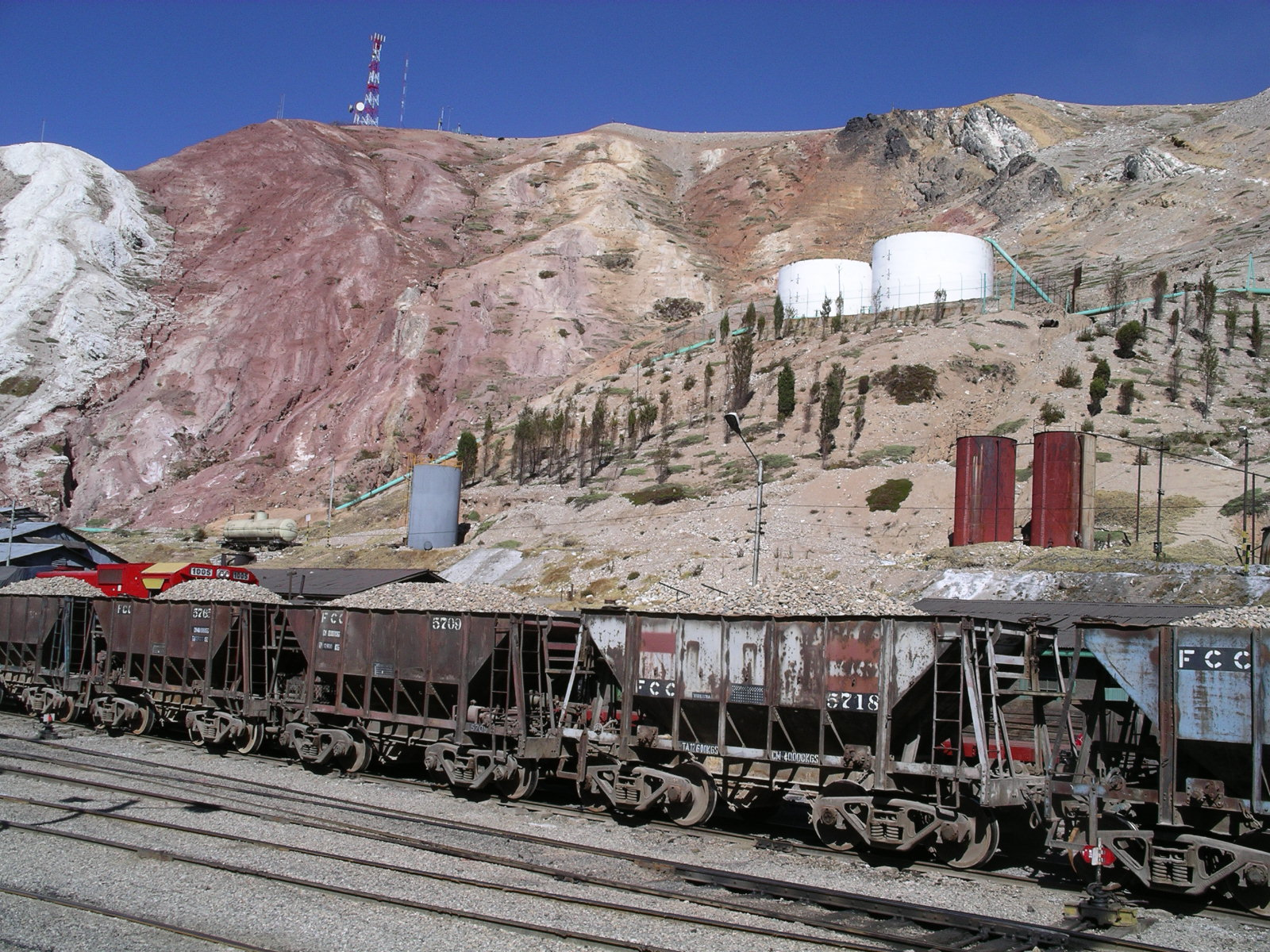
- View of some rail stations and the city

- Location within Peru
- Coordinates: 11.522°S 75.910°W
- Country: Peru
- Region: Junín
- Province: Yauli
- District: La Oroya

Government
  - Mayor: Saturnino Mc Gerson Camargo Zavala (2019-2022)

Area
  - Total: 388.42 km^{2} (149.97 sq mi)
- Elevation: 3,745 m (12,287 ft)

Population
  - Estimate (2015): 24,476
- Time zone: UTC-5 (PET)
- Website: www.oroya.com.pe

La Oroya is a city on the River Mantaro and capital of the Yauli Province, located in the Department of Junin in central Peru. It is situated on the eastern watershed of the Andes at an altitude of 3,745 m, some 176 km east-north-east of the national capital, Lima. La Oroya is the location of a smelting operation that earned the town a place on the Blacksmith Institute's 2007 report on "The World's Worst Polluted Places". It is also the eastern endpoint of the Central Highway of Peru (Carretera Central).

== History ==
In 1533, the Spanish established a small settlement and started small-scale mining for precious metals in the area, but isolation and transport difficulties hindered extraction. At the time of the War of Independence, the area's strategic position made it a center of guerrilla activity; one of the decisive battles of the war, Chacamarca (Junin), took place nearby, and Simón Bolívar passed through the town after the battle. In 1861, the settlement was named San Jeronímo de Callapampa and in 1893 it became La Oroya. In 1925, La Oroya was designated the capital of the Yauli province and finally, in 1942, it was elevated to city status.

Mining in the area developed gradually and did not greatly expand until the Ferrocarril Central Andino railway from Lima was completed in 1893. The railway, an extraordinary feat of engineering, was planned by the Polish railway builder Ernest Malinowski and crosses the Ticlio Pass, where it reaches an altitude of 4781 meters. Until the recent completion of the Qinghai-Tibet Railway it was the highest standard gauge railway in the world.

The smelter, now the city's main employer, was established in 1922 by the American Cerro de Pasco Corporation, who ran it until 1974 when Cerro was nationalized and became part of the state-owned Empresa Minera del Centro del Peru S A, otherwise known as Centromin. In 1993, the Peruvian government decided to privatize Centromin. In 1997, 99.97% of the La Oroya smelter was acquired by Doe Run Peru, a subsidiary (now an affiliate) of the Renco Group, for approximately US$247 million. The acquisition consisted of a capital contribution to Centromin's Metaloroya of US$126.5 million and a purchase price payment of US$120.5 million. Doe Run Peru also bought the Cobriza copper mine for US$7.5 million to maintain concentrate supplies to the copper smelter.

== Economy ==
=== Mining and Metallurgy ===
First to be built was the copper smelter in 1922, followed by the lead smelter in 1928 and the zinc refinery in 1952. Annual capacities were 70,000 tonnes of copper, 122,000 tonnes of lead, and 45,000 tonnes of zinc, although the need to keep below emission limits and temperature inversions that trap gases over the city, smelter, and surrounding area have tended to keep production below these levels.

Several local mines produce 'dirty concentrates' that contain metallic impurities that cannot be separated by the flotation process. Over the years, the La Oroya metallurgists have devised methods to separate and recover these metals as byproducts, and the three main smelters have become heavily integrated for this purpose. La Oroya is one of the few smelting operations in the world with this capability. As a result, La Oroya produces gold and silver (mainly from refinery residues), antimony, arsenic trioxide, bismuth, cadmium, indium, selenium, tellurium, sulfuric acid and oleum. This technology has helped the operation to reduce the emission of some noxious and toxic metals; however, the integrated nature of the plant has hindered the modification of individual parts of the plant.

With the acquisition of La Oroya, Doe Run inherited a complicated and partially semi-obsolescent smelter complex. The operation had suffered from disrepair, previous owners had invested little in modernization or clean operations. As a result of years of pollution, the hills immediately around the smelter became completely denuded, the river became more toxic, and the health of area inhabitants suffered. Residents have been found to have alarmingly high concentrations of lead in their blood and their drinking water, and many have bronchial troubles. A 1999 study (conducted two years after Doe Run's acquisition) showed high levels of air pollution, with 85 times more arsenic, 41 times more cadmium, and 13 times more lead than amounts generally considered safe.

== Pollution ==
When Doe Run bought La Oroya, it took over Centromin's PAMA, (Programa de Adecuación y Manejo Ambiental or Environmental Remediation and Management Program), an environmental contract requiring environmental remediation measures. The measures required new sulfuric acid plants, elimination of fugitive gases from the coke plant, use of oxygenated gases in the anodic residue plant, a water treatment plant for the copper refinery, a recirculation system for cooling waters at the smelter, management and disposal of acidic solutions at the silver refinery, an industrial wastewater treatment plant for the smelter and refinery, a containment dam for the lead mud near the silent plant, a granulation process water at the lead smelter, an anode washing system at the zinc refinery, management, and disposal of lead and copper slag wastes, domestic wastewater treatment, and domestic waste disposal. However, Doe Run Peru has been indemnified by Centromin (and guaranteed by the Peruvian Government) against any environmental liability arising out of Centromin's prior operations. Doe Run's original commitment to this program was US$107 million but it is now expected that it will cost at least US$244 million.

The company caused trouble in 2004, particularly among non-governmental organizations, when it said that it would not be able to complete the PAMA by the deadline of 2006, and asked for an extension. On December 29, 2004, the Peruvian Government issued Supreme Decree No. 046-2004-EM, which recognized that exceptional circumstances may justify an extension of the time to complete one or more projects within the scope of a PAMA. Doe Run Peru was granted such an extension by the Ministry of Energy and Mines on May 29, 2006. The exact reason for the request was not given but appears to have been a combination of cash flow availability, additional PAMA requirements, and additional upgrading. This includes the replacement of the reverberatory furnace with a submerged lanced reactor furnace for US$57 million which will reduce gas volume and provide a much richer sulfur dioxide off-gas that is far more suitable for sulfuric acid production.

Conditions of the extension include the payment into a trust account each month of revenue sufficient to cover the next month's estimated expenditure on the PAMA. Also, the company has been forbidden to make any payment to any shareholder or affiliate that might affect the completion of the PAMA. Renco has confirmed that it understands that Doe Run Peru would lose the benefit of the PAMA extension if any such payment is made.

The PAMA has since been modified to include the reduction of the stack and fugitive emissions to meet air quality objectives, certain additional pollution controls, and the protection of public health including the reduction of lead levels in the blood and special health programs for children and expectant mothers.

On February 5, 2008, Doe Run Peru reported that state health officials and OSINERGMIN, an independent Peruvian regulatory agency had confirmed that the quality of the Yauli or Mantaro Rivers was no longer impacted by the smelter's liquid discharges. However, the company also stated that the river was still polluted by mining and other operations upstream.

Other improvements have been achieved and on March 19, 2008, the company announced a 60% improvement in particulate emissions, a 61.7% reduction in air lead levels, a 72% reduction in cadmium levels, and an 81% decrease in arsenic levels, and the virtual elimination of polluting liquid discharges from the smelter into the Mantaro and Yauli rivers.

Despite advancements in other areas, sulfur dioxide emissions reached record levels in August 2008. However, according to the Wall Street Journal, the lead smelter acid plant became operational in October 2008. This will reduce sulfur dioxide emissions significantly. Further improvement can be expected when the copper smelter acid plant is completed, which is expected in October 2009. Thereafter, the main sources of sulfur dioxide from the smelter should be under control.

Nevertheless, none of these expected results have been attained in reality. The indicators shown above were designed by Doe Run and have not been certified by any official institute. Despite revenues that exceed US$150 million in each year of operations, after four months of the lower price in minerals, Doe Run has asked the Peruvian Government for a bailout. No other company from the same activity has done that. But this request surprisingly coincides with a new request from Doe Run for an extension to comply with PAMA requirements. That means, the expected results in 2009 again will not be completed.

== Protest ==
The people who live in La Oroya have received over twenty years of legal support by the Interamerican Association for Environmental Defense (AIDA). The work was led by a Colombian-born Mexican lawyer named Astrid Puentes Riaño. In 2024 the United Nations made her their third special rapporteur looking at human rights and the environment.

== Climate ==
Climate data for La Oroya, elevation 3,842 m (12,605 ft), (1991–2020)
Month	Jan	Feb	Mar	Apr	May	Jun	Jul	Aug	Sep	Oct	Nov	Dec	Year
Mean daily maximum °C (°F)	15.4 (59.7)	15.1 (59.2)	15.0 (59.0)	15.5 (59.9)	16.0 (60.8)	15.6 (60.1)	15.3 (59.5)	15.7 (60.3)	15.8 (60.4)	16.0 (60.8)	16.8 (62.2)	15.5 (59.9)	15.6 (60.2)
Mean daily minimum °C (°F)	3.4 (38.1)	4.1 (39.4)	4.0 (39.2)	2.7 (36.9)	0.4 (32.7)	−1.7 (28.9)	−2.3 (27.9)	−1.3 (29.7)	0.9 (33.6)	2.1 (35.8)	2.3 (36.1)	3.4 (38.1)	1.5 (34.7)
Average precipitation mm (inches)	93.2 (3.67)	102.8 (4.05)	81.2 (3.20)	46.6 (1.83)	22.3 (0.88)	13.5 (0.53)	13.3 (0.52)	17.4 (0.69)	37.3 (1.47)	52.0 (2.05)	57.0 (2.24)	91.0 (3.58)	627.6 (24.71)
Source: National Meteorology and Hydrology Service of Peru

== Notes ==
- (in Spanish) Instituto Nacional de Estadística e Informática. Banco de Información Digital. Retrieved February 29, 2008.
