= Gerard Quinn =

Irish law professor

Academic background
- Education: University of Galway; Harvard Law School

Academic work
- Discipline: Law
- Institutions: University of Galway

Gerard Quinn is a professor of law at the University of Leeds and at the Wallenberg Institute in the University of Lund, Sweden. He was formerly professor of law at NUI Galway, Ireland, and Director of the university's Centre for Disability Law and Policy at the School of Law. He was appointed to the Council of State by the President of Ireland, Michael D. Higgins in 2012.

== Life ==
Quinn was a graduate of University College, Galway and he was called to the Irish Bar in 1983. He was awarded a masters (LLM) and doctorate in law (SJD) from Harvard Law School. He is an authority on comparative disability law and policy.

In October, 2020, Quinn was appointed by the United Nations Human Rights Council as the second UN Special Rapporteur on the Rights of Persons with Disabilities. He succeeded the founding rapporteur Catalina Devandas Aguilar of Costa Rica. Following Quinn's appointment, his ideas on the importance of disability law and policy have been disseminated by Open Society Foundations, the European Network on Independent Living. He was succeeded as rapporteur by the Egyptian parliamentarian Heba Hagrass.
