= Astrid Puentes Riaño =

Law professor

- Born: 1975 (age 50–51); Bogotá
- Education: Universidad de Los Andes, (Bogotá, Colombia) Universidad del País Vasco (San Sebastián, Spain) University of Florida (Gainesville, Florida) Universidad de Costa Rica
- Occupation: Law professor
- Employer: Universidad Iberoamericana Law School
- Known for: United Nations Special Rapporteur on Human Rights and the Environment
- Predecessor: David Boyd

Astrid Jovanna Puentes Riaño (born 1975) is a Colombian-born Mexican law professor. She has led the Interamerican Association for Environmental Defense (AIDA) to support the people who live in La Oroya, "one of the most polluted places on Earth". In 2024 she became the United Nations Special Rapporteur on the human right to a healthy environment.

== Life ==
Puentes Riaño was born in Bogotá in 1975. She studied law at American University's Washington School of Law. She obtained her master's degree at the University of Florida and at the University of the Basque Country in Spain she graduated in environmental law.

La Oroya in Peru has been said to be the most polluted place in the world. The people who live in La Oroya have received over twenty years of legal support by the Interamerican Association for Environmental Defense (Asociación Interamericana para la Defensa del Ambiente, AIDA). The work was led by Puentes Riaño and in 2024, AIDA announced that they had successfully opened a case to sue the company responsible on behalf of the residents. She and AIDA established that the people in La Oroya have a legal right to a healthy environment.

She was a director and a vice-president of the International Rivers organisation and she led AIDA for 18 years. In 2023 those organisations were part of a large collaboration that had called for the Global Recognition of the Right to a Healthy Environment. that won the 2023 UN Human Rights Prize.

Puentes Riaño teaches law at the Berta Cáceres Environmental Justice Clinic at the Universidad Iberoamericana in Mexico City and her primary nationality has become Mexican.

She became the third special rapporteur looking at human rights and the environment in 2024. She took over from David Boyd who is Canadian. She was chosen on the same day as several other rapporteurs including the Colombian Gina Romero who looks at human rights and freedom of association and the Italian lawyer Elisa Morgera who is an expert in human rights and climate change.

The right to a clean environment was established in 2022 when the UN General Assembly unanimously agreed with the proposal. The task facing her at her appointment was to ensure that all the countries who agreed with the new right are ensuring that they are reinforcing this approach with their own citizens.

She was quoted in an interview with Amnesty International where she said "The first step toward building a truly just world is becoming truly uncomfortable with inequalities and discrimination". In June 2024, Riaño was one of the many UN experts who spoke out against the sale of arms to Israel as a result of the conflict in Gaza. The experts cautioned arms suppliers and finance companies that they would be implicated in human rights violations. The list included special reporteurs Reem Alsalem, Paula Gaviria Betancur, Tlaleng Mofokeng, Attiya Waris, Mary Lawlor, Margaret Satterthwaite and Francesca Albanese.
