= Interamerican Association for Environmental Defense =

Nonprofit environmental law organization

- Founded: 1998
- Purpose: Environmentalism, Public Health, Human Rights, Climate Change, Environmental Law
- Location: San Francisco, California, United States
- Region served: The Americas
- Website: aida-americas.org

The Interamerican Association for Environmental Defense (Spanish: Asociacion Interamericana para la Defensa del Ambiente) (AIDA) is a non-profit international environmental law organization founded in 1996 by a collaboration of five environmental organizations in the Americas.

AIDA's headquarters is in San Francisco, California. The organization works internationally with partners in many different countries including Argentina, Canada, Chile, Colombia, Costa Rica, Ecuador, Mexico, and Peru.

AIDA works primarily to improve and protect human health and the environment. AIDA's most notable work has been in La Oroya, Peru, where they have fought the poisoning of local people by heavy metals and other contaminants emitted by a local smelter. AIDA has also made significant impacts protecting the leatherback turtle in Costa Rica through a partnership with Cedarena.

== Organization ==
AIDA conducts its efforts according to four basic principles:

1. Encourage Transnational Collaboration - In many cases, environmental crises can't be boxed into individual nations. Pesticide spraying in Colombia threatens forests in Ecuador; polluted waters from Bolivia damage fragile wetlands in Brazil; overfishing by boats registered in Panama causes global disruptions in marine ecosystems; and consumer excess in the United States strains environmental resources throughout the hemisphere.

2. Protect human rights - Environmental health and human rights are two sides of the same coin. Without the services provided by functioning ecosystems – clean water, breathable air, and productive soil – human communities cannot thrive. When human rights are violated, democracy fails. When significant disparities in economic capacity and political influence are involved, AIDA protects poor communities struggling against powerful corporate or state interests.

3. Cultivate the power of international law - Many international treaties make promises that do not get fulfilled. AIDA designs international strategies that lead to measurable results and holds governments accountable and builds the capacity of key players in positions to make a difference.

4. Encourage citizen enforcement and public participation - Lasting change comes from the ground up. AIDA works to empower the communities and organizations that we represent. Sometimes, governments cannot be relied upon to protect basic environmental and human rights. When the authorities don't deliver, AIDA helps nonprofit organizations enforce the law.

== Programs ==
AIDA partners with local groups to field multinational teams of lawyers and scientists to tackle a range of environmental and human rights crises – including the decline of freshwater resources, the proliferation of toxins, climate change, and the decimation of vulnerable biodiversity.

AIDA's efforts are divided into five strategic themes:

1. Human Rights and the Environment- AIDA works to establish the connection between environmental degradation and harm to under-resourced communities throughout the Americas. When big business moves in to extract natural resources or develop infrastructure, local people are often left with contaminated water, polluted air, and no way to feed their families.

2. Marine Biodiversity and Coastal Protection- Marine ecosystems are among the most threatened environmental resources in the Americas. AIDA works to implement legal, administrative, and political strategies to help protect endangered species, encourage the sustainable harvesting of delicate marine resources, and protect coastal areas that provide essential habitat to threatened biodiversity and human communities.

3. Climate Change - Global warming is the most systemic and long-range threat to environmental health. AIDA has recently expanded its efforts to include work on climate change, with a focus on developing legal tools and regulatory frameworks that will help move human societies toward energy sustainability and protect those most harmed by rising sea levels and changing weather patterns.

4. Freshwater Preservation - Clean water is a cornerstone of human and environmental health. AIDA implements legal strategies to protect ecosystems that serve as vital freshwater resources for nearby communities and biodiversity. AIDA also works to prevent companies from polluting freshwater supplies with poisonous toxins.

5. Strengthening Environmental Governance and Public Participation - AIDA works to build capacity in Latin and Central America by educating decision makers, distributing information to nonprofit organizations, and building alliances among communities and lawyers working for environmental protection. We work to protect the ability of the public to participate meaningfully in important environmental decisions.

== Workshops ==
AIDA periodically offers training workshops to legal advocates throughout the hemisphere. The workshops emphasize the inseparable link between human rights and the environment, reinforce participants’ understanding of the Inter-American System of Human Rights, and promote discussion on protecting human rights and the environment within this hemisphere. Workshops include presentations by experts, case studies, and participatory discussions.

== Partners ==
AIDA works on projects in collaboration with environmental and human rights groups throughout the hemisphere, including the following organizations:

- Center for Environmental Law and Natural Resources (CEDARENA) Spanish only, Costa Rica
- Center for Human Rights and Environment (CEDHA), Argentina
- Earthjustice, the United States
- ECOLEX Spanish only, Ecuador
- Ecojustice, Canada
- Fiscalía del Medio Ambiente (FIMA) Spanish only, Chile
- Justice for Nature (JPN) Spanish only, Costa Rica
- Mexican Environmental Law Center (CEMDA), Mexico
- The Peruvian Environmental Law Society (SPDA) Spanish only, Peru

== La Oroya ==
La Oroya in Peru has been said to be the most polluted place in the world. The people who live in La Oroya have received over twenty years of legal support by the Interamerican Association for Environmental Defense (AIDA). The work was led by a Colombian-born Mexican lawyer named Astrid Puentes Riaño. In 2024 the United Nations made her their third special rapporteur looking at human rights and the environment.
