= Monash University, Prato Centre =

Coordinates: 43.8804°N 11.0992°E

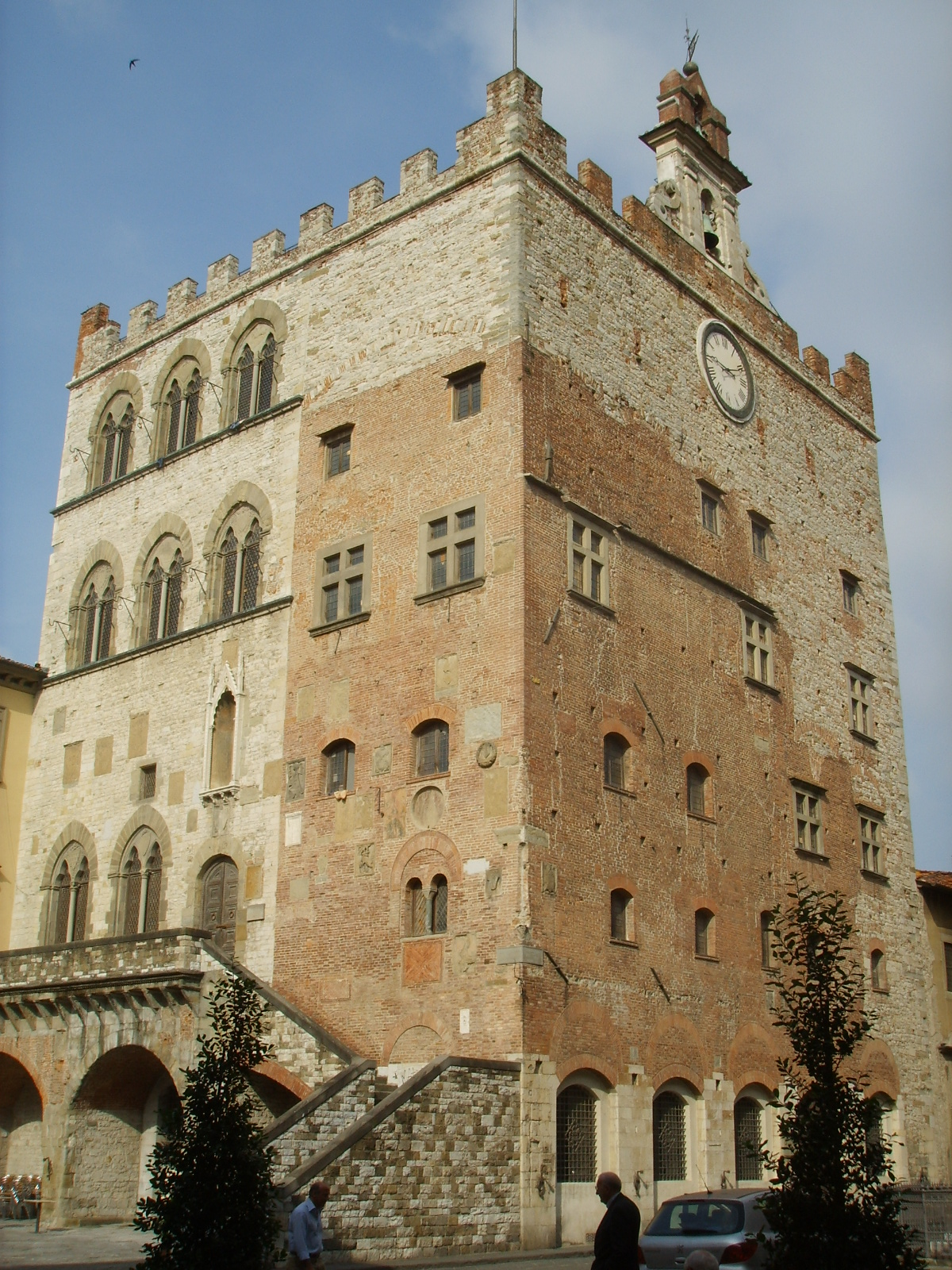
Palazzo Pretorio, another of Prato's palaces in its historical centre.

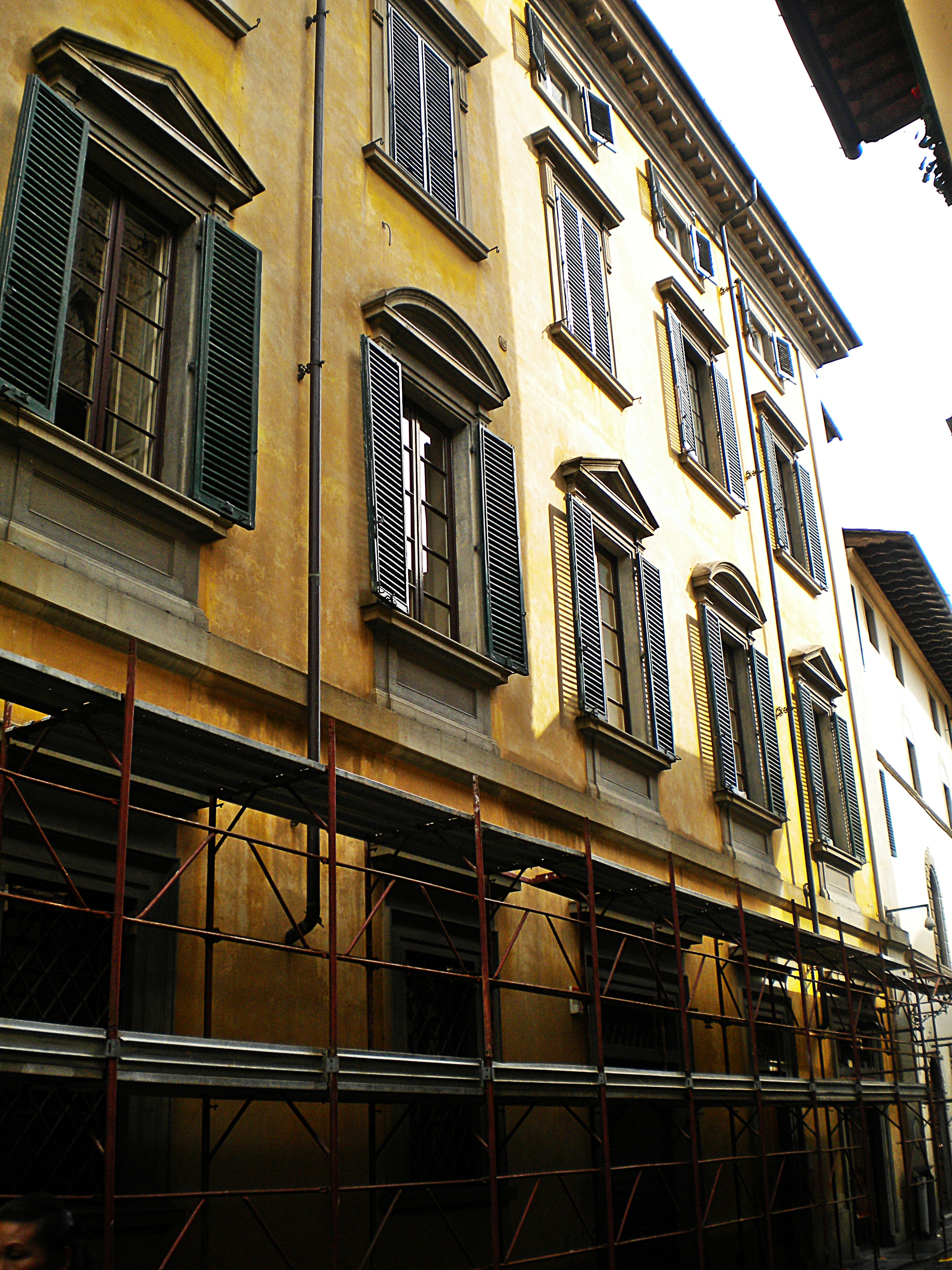
Palazzo Vai, where the campus is located

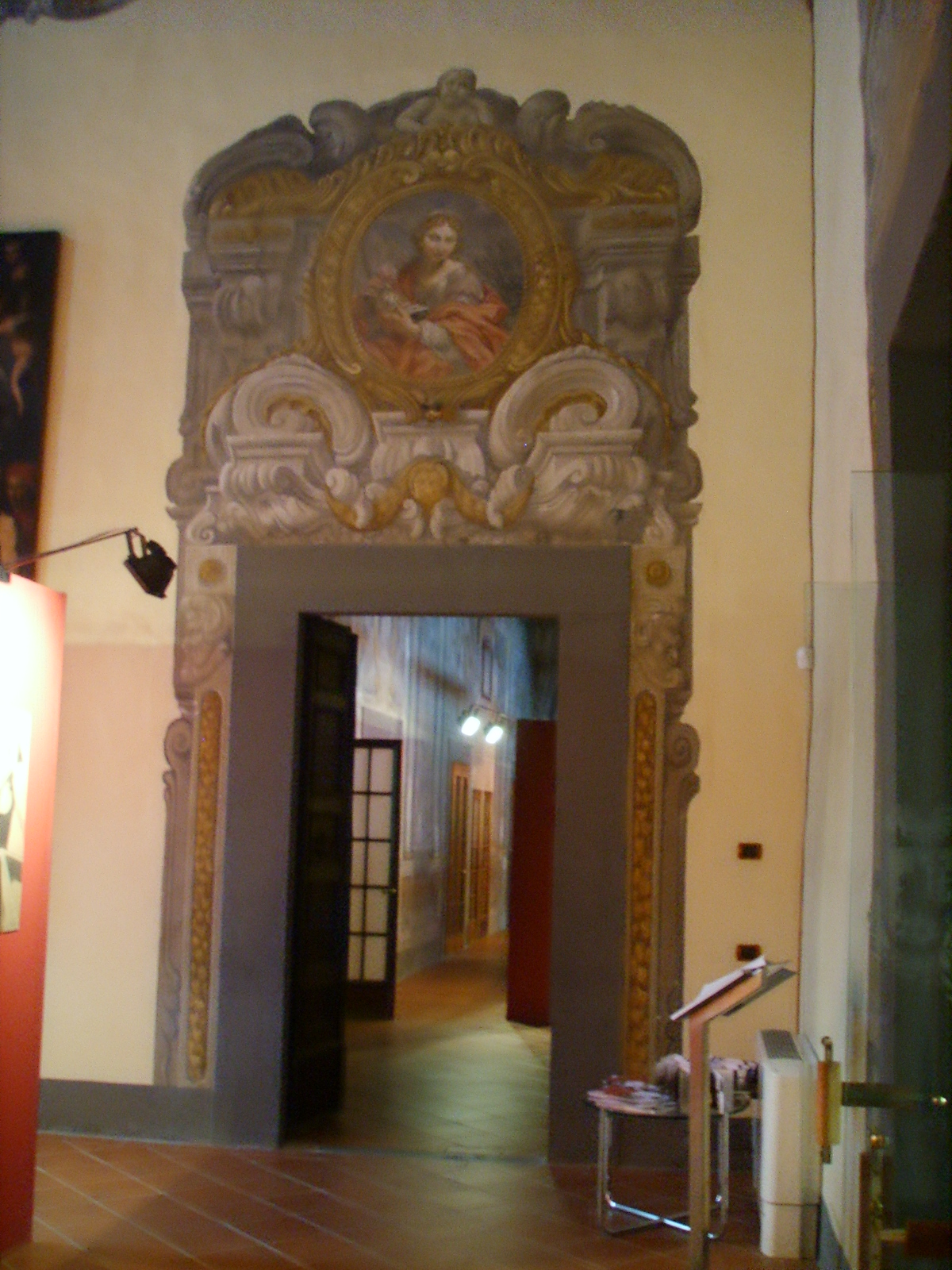
Interior of palazzo Vai

The Monash University Prato campus (often known as Monash Prato) is a teaching and research centre in Tuscany. It is located in an 18th-century palace, the Palazzo Vaj (or Vai), in the historical centre of Prato. It was opened on 17 September 2001, as part of Monash University's internationalisation policy. It was established with the assistance of the local government of Prato, the region of Tuscany and prominent Italian-Australians Rino and Diana Grollo.

The Centre aims to develop Australia's links with Europe, through research collaboration, seminars and conferences, and as a centre of study for Australian students.

It is now the largest Australian institution of its kind in Europe. The Centre's patron is Sir James Gobbo, AC, an Australian jurist who was the first Governor of Victoria of Italian descent.

== Location ==
Prato is a city and comune in Tuscany. It is 24 km from Florence, accessible by road or a 20-minute train ride. It is a centre of Italy's textile industry and of the slow food movement. It is home to around 180,000 people, making it the second largest city in Tuscany and the third largest in Central Italy, after Florence and Rome. In addition to Monash, other educational institutions in Prato include Il Polo Universitario "Città di Prato" (a branch of the University of Florence).

Situated at Via Pugliesi 26, the Monash Prato Centre occupies the Palazzo Vaj, an 18th-century palace in the town's historical centre. Certain parts of the building are believed to be even older, as 15th century frescoes have been discovered on one of the Palazzo's outer walls. The name Vaj (pronounced vai in Italian) comes from the family which originally owned the building in the 18th century. From 1875 to 1999, the palazzo was a prestigious club for local businessmen, largely used for gaming. The modern interior was largely created in the 1950s by the famous Italian architect Italo Gamberini and is heritage-listed by the Italian Government.

== Activities ==
The Prato Centre hosts students from Monash who complete part of their degree at the Centre. The main academic areas offered by the Centre are law, art and design, music, history, international relations and Italian. This entails hundreds of Monash students being hosted by the Centre throughout the year. Classes are conducted by academics from Monash University, as well scholars from the University of Florence, Osgoode Hall Law School, King's College London and various experts working within the law, social sciences and the arts. The Centre is popular among Monash students, because it enables them to study overseas without having to transfer to a foreign university.

The Centre also holds major international conferences, organised by both Monash and other academic institutions. Additionally, it regularly hosts a range of guest speakers for students, staff and the local community. The Centre also has an Artist-in-Residence program.

Since the establishment of the Prato Centre, more than 12,000 students and researchers have studied and worked there.

== Centre Directors ==
- Bill Kent (2000–2004)
- Annamaria Pagliaro (2005–2008)
- Loretta Baldassar (2009–2011)
- Cecilia Hewlett (2012–)

== Notable faculty ==
Each year, staff from across the world visit the Centre to teach the various courses on offer. Regular teachers at the Centre include:

- Stephen Charles - former Justice of the Supreme Court of Victoria
- Annalisa Ciampi - former United Nations Special Rapporteur on the Rights to Freedom of Peaceful Assembly and of Association (2017)
- Nancy Gertner - Judge of the United States District Court for the District of Massachusetts
- George Hampel - former Justice of the Supreme Court of Victoria, Professor of Trial Practice and Advocacy
