= David Richard Boyd =

United Nations special rapporteur

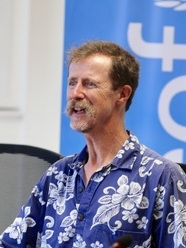

was United Nations Special Rapporteur on Human Rights and the Environment
- In office 2018–2024
- Succeeded by: Astrid Puentes Riaño

David Richard Boyd is a Canadian environmental lawyer, activist, and diplomat. He was the United Nations Special Rapporteur on human rights and the environment until 2024.

== Education and career ==
Boyd graduated from University of Alberta, and University of Toronto. He was executive director of Ecojustice Canada. He teaches at University of British Columbia.

He has been involved in international, environmental, and human rights advocacy.

== Publications ==
Thematic reports

- Call for Recognition of the Human Right to a Healthy Environment, co-authored with John Knox, former Special Rapporteur on human rights and environment, General Assembly, 2018, A/73/188
- The Right to Breathe Clean Air, Human Rights Council, 2019, A/HRC/40/55.
- A Safe Climate, General Assembly, 2019, UN Doc. A/74/161 (25 pp.) Annex. A Safe Climate: Additional good practices, UN Doc. A/74/161/Annex (13 pp.)
- Good practices in recognizing and implementing the right to a safe, clean, healthy and sustainable environment. Human Rights Council, 2020, UN Doc. A/HRC/43/53 (27 pp.) Annex III: Additional Good Practices (31 pp.) Regional Annexes on Constitutions, Treaties, and Legislation Recognizing the Right to a Safe, Clean, Healthy and Sustainable Environment Annex IV: Africa (37 pp.) Annex V: Asia-Pacific (27 pp.)Annex VI: Eastern Europe (28 pp.) Annex VII: Latin America and the Caribbean (35 pp.) Annex VIII: Western Europe and Other States (25 pp.)
- Human Rights Depend on a Healthy Biosphere, General Assembly, 2020, UN Doc. A/74/161. (26pp) Annex. Healthy Biosphere: Additional good practices (49 pp.).
- The Global Water Crisis and Human Rights: Water Pollution, Water Scarcity and Water-related Disasters (21 pp.), Human Rights Council, 2021, UN Doc. A/HRC/46/28. Annex. Safe and Sufficient Water: Additional good practices (33 pp.).
- Healthy and Sustainable Food: Reducing the Environmental Impacts of Food Systems on Human Rights, General Assembly, 2021, UN Doc. A/76/179. Annex. Healthy and Sustainable Food: Additional good practices
- Non-toxic Environments and Sacrifice Zones, Human Rights Council, 2022, A/HRC/49/53. Annex I. Good practices. Annex II. Additional sacrifice zones
- The human right to a clean, healthy and sustainable environment: a catalyst for accelerated action to achieve the Sustainable Development Goals. General Assembly, 2022, UN Doc. A/77/284, plus Annex I. Good practices and Annex II. Links between SDG targets and international human rights instruments.
- Women, Girls and the Right to a Clean, Healthy and Sustainable Environment, Human Rights Council, 2023, UN Doc. A/HRC/52/33. Annex I. Good practices.
- Paying Polluters: The catastrophic consequences of Investor-State Dispute Settlement mechanisms, General Assembly, 2023, UN Doc. A/78/168.
- Business, planetary boundaries and the right to a clean, healthy and sustainable environment, Human Rights Council, 2024, UN Doc. A/HRC/55/43. Annex 1. Good practices.

HRC mandated summary reports of expert meetings

- Good practices—Summary Report on Experts Meeting on Experiences with the Right to a Safe, Clean, Healthy and Sustainable Environment, Human Rights Council, 2020, UN Doc. A/HRC/43/54 (21 pp.)
- Pandemic Prevention—Summary of the Expert Seminar on human rights and environmental conservation in the prevention of future pandemics. Human Rights Council, 2022, A/HRC/52/44.
- Business and the right to a clean, healthy and sustainable environment—Summary of the Expert Seminar on business and the human right to a clean, healthy and sustainable environment, 2024. A/HRC/55/41.
