= Journal of International Criminal Justice =

- Discipline: Law
- Language: English

Publication details
- Publisher: Oxford University Press (United Kingdom)

Standard abbreviations
- ISO 4: J. Int. Crim. Justice

Indexing
- ISSN: 1478-1387 (print); 1478-1395 (web)

Links
- Journal homepage

The Journal of International Criminal Justice is a peer reviewed academic journal of international criminal law. It is published by Oxford University Press.
