= Ashwini K.P. =

Indian political scientist

Ashwini K. P.
- Born: 1986 (age 39–40); Chikkaballapur
- Occupation: lecturer
- Known for: United Nations special rapporteur
- Term: six years

Ashwini K P (born 1986) is an Indian political scientist and university lecturer who became the United Nations special rapporteur on racism in 2022.

== Life ==
Ashwini was born in Chikkaballapur near the city of Kolar. She is from the low marginalised Hindu caste known as the dalits and her parents were V Prasannakumar and Jayamma.

Her higher education started studying history, Economics and Political Science at Bangalore's Mount Carmel College. She graduated and went on to obtain a master's degree from St. Joseph's College in Political Science. She then took her doctorate in New Delhi in South Asian Studies at Jawaharlal Nehru University.

She was one of three candidates who were considered for the role of the United Nations Human Rights Council's Special Rapporteur at a meeting in October 2022 in Geneva. The Human Rights Council decided to appoint her as the first Indian to the role - which lasts for six years from 1 November. She is in charge of any investigations she may make into a wide range of xenophobic discrimination. She has a mandate to look into racial intolerance wherever she decides in the world. These Special Rapporteur experts are appointed by the United Nations and they are unpaid. In 2023 there were 60 of these experts.

As part of a two-week tour of the United States she met a number of leaders and marginalised groups. She attended the World Jewish Congress where she was presented with evidence of an increase in antisemitism. The WJC's lead has seen a rise in holocaust denial on social media. In one report it was said that 50% of holocaust posts on Telegram were denying or distorting the holocaust. Ashwini said that she would include this subject in her report in 2025. At the end of the American tour she accused some people of "selective amnesia" by not realising that racial discrimination was still a problem.
