= Ana Brian Nougreres =

Uruguayan academic and lawyer

Ana Brian Nougrères
- Occupations: Professor and attorney
- Employer: University of Montevideo
- Known for: UN Special Rapporteur on the right to privacy.

Ana Brian Nougrères is a Uruguayan academic (since 2000), lawyer (since 1985) and the United Nations Special Rapporteur on the right to privacy (since 2021). She was council adviser for the Senate and Chamber of Deputies in Montevideo (1992-2019).

== Life ==
As council adviser to the Uruguayan Parliament, she acted as a consultant for politicians in the Senate and in the Chamber of Deputies, holding the position for more than two decades, until she left in 2019.

As Professor of Law, Privacy and ICT at Universidad de la República and University of Montevideo, she teaches to students of Law, of IT Engineering and Data Science.

She was the chosen volunteer to be the United Nations Special Rapporteur on the Right to Privacy, replacing Joseph Cannataci, who had been the first appointee from 2015 and who had served for six years. Doctor Ana Brian Nougreres was renewed Special Rapporteur on 2024 by the United Nations Human Rights Council.

As Special Rapporteur of the United Nations she presented several reports at the United Nations General Assembly in New York City, regarding neurotech (A/80/283), regarding what a regulation on data protection and privacy should contemplate (A/79/173), principles of transparency and explainability in artificial intelligence (A/78/310), principles on privacy and data protection (A/77/196). She spoke about the increasing use of private data on-line. She accepted that new digital technologies process personal data in an invasive and large-scale manner. These processes often do not respect the legitimate expectations of the individual and their human right to privacy. She published guidelines in which she encouraged each nation to consider her recommendations which were broken down into ten areas: lawfulness, consent, transparency, purpose, loyalty, proportionality, minimisation, quality, responsibility and security. The advice was intended to assist each different country to find a balance between the conflicting interests of processing personal data and the right to privacy.

She addressed the United Nations Human Rights Council in Geneva, where she spoke of international collection of personal data (A/HRC/61/48), neurotechnology (A/HRC/58/58), legal remedies for the safeguard of privacy and data protection (A/HRC/55/46), COVID 19 and data protection principles (A/HRC/52/37), evolution of the principles on data protection and privacy in Iberoamerica (A/HRC/49/55).

In November 2021 she attended a meeting of the Council of Europe regarding the Convention for the Protection of Individuals with Regard to Automatic Processing of Personal Data (Convention 108) and in May 2025 she participated with a keynote on "Neurotechnology and Privacy: Navigating human rights and regulatory challenges in the age of neural data".

She participated in the Conference on Privacy and Data Protection 2022 (CPDP 2022) in Brussels addressing international data flows and privacy issues and, in 2026, she participated in a multistakeholder panel of CPDP 2026 organized by the Council of Europe addressing "Transparency by Default: an internet transparency code of practice".

Involved with the CPDP LATAM since its inception, she was keynote speaker in 2025 "Building informational self determination in the global majority" and presented a paper on "Taxation and Regulation", and in 2024 was key note speaker "Aligning Latin America and the G20". In 2023 she made her contribution on "Artificial Intelligence and data transfers in Latin America" and in "Leveraging Innovation and Data Protection". In 2022, she contributed as speaker on "Articial Intelligence and Data Protection".

== Publications ==
- Protección de datos personales en Uruguay, 2007
- Uruguay y la protección de datos personales, 2020
- The Uruguayan law system facing security breaches, 2021
- El Delegado de Protección de Datos en Uruguay, 2021
- Privacy and personal data protection in Ibero-America: a step towards globalization?, 2022
- "Towards a Latin American Model of Adquacy for the Internatioinal Transfer of Personal Data", Awarded Privacy Papers for Policymakers, Future of Privacy Forum, 2023
- Las autoridades de protección de datos personales ante el denominado "data scraping", 2025
- La Inteligencia Artificial en Uruguay, 2024
- El marco nacional de ciberseguridad en Chile y Uruguay
- Transferencia Internacional de Datos Personales en América Latina: hacia la armonización de normas", 2025
