= Transformative research =

Transformative research is a term that became increasingly common within the science policy community in the 2000s for research that shifts or breaks existing scientific paradigms. The idea has its provenance in Thomas Kuhn's notion of scientific revolutions, where one scientific paradigm is overturned for another. Classic examples are the Copernican Revolution, Albert Einstein's theories, the work of Watson and Crick, and plate tectonics theory.

The term has most been used by the U.S. National Science Foundation (NSF), but it also shows up within other agencies. At the National Institutes of Health (NIH) the phrase is sometimes rendered as 'translational research' or 'high-risk, high-reward', which is defined as "research with an inherent high degree of uncertainty and the capability to produce a major impact on important problems in biomedical/behavioral research." NIH also has a Transformative Research Projects Program - R01. Within the European Research Council, the term is 'frontier research.' National Science Foundation (NSF's) National Science Board defined transformative research as "research that has the capacity to revolutionize existing fields, create new sub-fields, cause paradigm shifts, support discovery, and lead to radically new technologies." NSF announced August 9, 2007 that its board had endorsed a proposal by former NSF director Arden L. Bement, Jr. to increase the agency's support for transformative research. A 2008 report by the American Academy of Arts and Sciences explicitly links financial support for early-career researchers and high-risk, high-reward or potentially transformative research to the national goal of "sustaining America's competitive advantage."

As a result of broad endorsement from program officials, policy analysts, economists, and various policy makers, NSF has recently amended its merit review criteria, according to which grant proposals are evaluated by reviewers, to include an emphasis on potentially transformative research. The National Science Board's Task Force on Merit Review introduced the new versions of the Intellectual Merit and Broader Impacts criteria in its final report. The following statement is now included in the Intellectual Merit criterion of the NSF Grant Proposal Guide: "To what extent does the proposed activity suggest and explore creative, original, or potentially transformative concepts?"

In March 2012, NSF hosted a workshop at NSF Headquarters on 'Transformative Research: Ethical and Societal Dimensions.' The workshop explored the history and alternative conceptions of a term that has come to play an increasingly important role in policy debates at NSF, at other federal agencies, and in public discourse about the future of science in society.
