= United Nations Special Rapporteur on the Rights to Freedom of Peaceful Assembly and of Association =

United Nations Special Rapporteur

UN Special Rapporteur on the rights to freedom of peaceful assembly and of association
- Emblem of the United Nations
- Incumbent; Gina Romero (Colombia) since 2024
- Term length: Three years
- Inaugural holder: Maina Kiai (Kenya)
- Formation: UN Human Rights Council resolution 15/21 (October 2010)
- Website: www.ohchr.org/EN/Issues/AssemblyAssociation/Pages/SRFreedomAssemblyAssociationIndex.aspx

The United Nations special rapporteur on the rights to freedom of peaceful assembly and of association works independently to inform and advise the United Nations Human Rights Council. The special rapporteur examines, monitors, advises and publicly reports on the rights to freedom of peaceful assembly and of association worldwide.

The position was created by Human Rights Council resolution 15/21 in October 2010. This position is voluntary, and the expert is not United Nations staff nor paid for his/her work.

The first mandate-holder, Maina Kiai, took up his duties on May 1, 2011, for an initial period of three years. He began his second three-year term in May 2014 and completed his term on April 30, 2017. Kiai is a lawyer and human rights defender from Kenya.

The third mandate-holder, Clément Nyaletsossi Voule of Togo, took up his work on March 1, 2018. He served until 2024 when he was succeeded by the Colombian Gina Romero.

== Mandate ==
The Special Rapporteur is mandated to gather all relevant information relating to the promotion and protection of the rights to freedom of peaceful assembly and of association throughout the world. The Special Rapporteur is also mandated to make recommendations on ways to ensure the promotion and protection of these rights, to report on rights violations, and to issue reports on his findings.

The mandate was initially established for three years. In September 2013, it was extended for an additional three years, through 2017.

== Working methods ==
In the discharge of his mandate, the Special Rapporteur:

- Transmits urgent appeals and letters of allegation to Member States on alleged violations of the rights to freedom of peaceful assembly and/or of association;
- Undertakes fact-finding country visits;
- Submits annual reports covering activities relating to the mandate to the Human Rights Council and to the General Assembly;
- Engages publicly on issues of concern, including through press statements.

== Work of former Special Rapporteur Kiai (2011–2017) ==
Former Special Rapporteur Kiai authored seven reports to the Human Rights Council on the subjects of:

- Best practices in promoting the freedoms of assembly and association (May 2012);
- Civil society’s ability to access funding and resources (April 2013);
- The plight of groups "most at risk" when exercising their assembly and association rights (June 2014);
- The rights to freedom of peaceful assembly and of association in the context of natural resource exploitation (June 2015);
- A joint report on recommendations for the effective management of assemblies (March 2016), with fellow Special Rapporteur Christof Heyns.
- Fundamentalism's impact on assembly and association rights (June 2016);
- Imagining a World Without Participation: Mapping the Achievements of Civil Society (June 2017 - presented by successor Annalisa Ciampi)

Kiai also authored four reports to the UN General Assembly, on the subjects of:

- The rights to freedom of peaceful assembly and association in the context of elections (October 2013).
- The effect that multilateral institutions have on promoting and protecting assembly and association rights (October 2014).
- Comparing countries treatments of businesses and associations, and exploring why businesses generally get much more favorable treatment (October 2015).
- The difficulties faced by the world's most marginalized workers in exercising their assembly and association rights in the workplace (October 2016).

Kiai also made nine official country visits, to Georgia (2012), the United Kingdom (Jan. 2013 & April 2016), Rwanda (Jan. 2014), Oman (Sept. 2014), Kazakhstan (Jan. 2015), Chile (Sept. 2015), the Republic of Korea (Jan. 2016) and the United States of America (July 2016).

Kiai issued more than 190 press statements via OHCHR and sent over 900 communications to UN member states.

Kiai also attended numerous conferences and meetings on the subject matter of his mandate and convenes consultations with various stakeholders on the subject.

In 2014, Freedom House awarded Kiai its Freedom Award, an acknowledgment begun in 1943 "to extol recipients’ invaluable contribution to the cause of freedom and democracy." Prior Freedom Award honorees include Chen Guangcheng, Aung San Suu Kyi, Václav Havel, the 14th Dalai Lama, Medgar Evers, and Edward R. Murrow.

In October 2016, Kiai received the United Nations Foundation's Leo Nevas Award for his work as Special Rapporteur. The award recognizes "those who have served as agents of change in advancing international human rights." In December 2016, he was awarded the 2016 AFL-CIO George Meany-Lane Kirkland Human Rights Award.

In response to continued significant police conflict with the Black Lives Matter and other social movements in the US, he conducted the first ever official country visit to the United States by a Special Rapporteur on the rights to freedom of peaceful assembly and of association in July 2016.

== See also ==
- Special rapporteur
- United Nations special rapporteur
- Maina Kiai, former Special Rapporteur on the freedoms of peaceful assembly and of association (2011–17)
- Annalisa Ciampi, former Special Rapporteur on the freedoms of peaceful assembly and of association (2017)
