= Catalina Devandas Aguilar =

Costa Rican diplomat

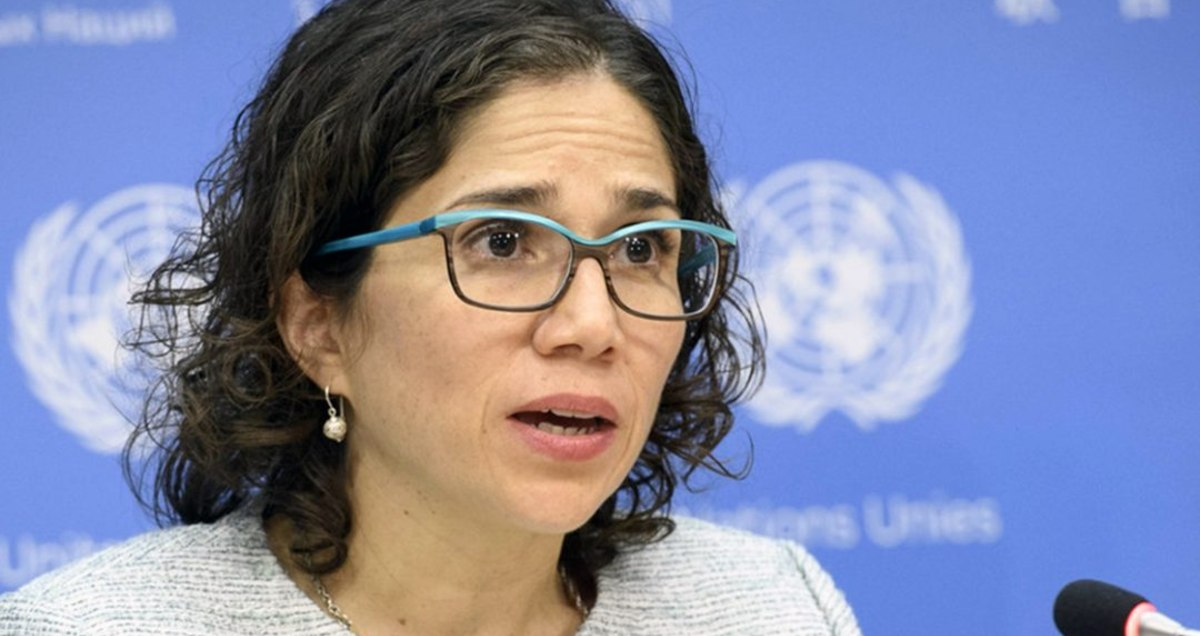

United Nations Special Rapporteur on the Rights of Persons with Disabilities
- In office 1 December 2014 – 2020
- Preceded by: Position established
- Succeeded by: Gerard Quinn

Personal details
- Born: September 24, 1975 (age 50) San José, Costa Rica

Catalina Devandas Aguilar (born 24 September 1975) is a Costa Rican lawyer who served as the first United Nations Special Rapporteur on the Rights of Persons with Disabilities from 2014 until 2020. In May 2024, she was appointed Senior Director for the Office of Partnerships, Advocacy and Communications with the International Organization for Migration (IOM UN Migration). Previously, she served as Permanent Representative of Costa Rica to the United Nations at Geneva. She also worked for the World Bank and took part in the establishment of the Convention on the Rights of Persons with Disabilities with the United Nations Secretariat. She has spina bifida and uses a wheelchair.

== Career ==
She has previously consulted for the World Bank and was part of the United Nations Secretariat that established the Convention on the Rights of Persons with Disabilities. In 2009, Ms. Devandas Aguilar began working for the Disability Rights Advocacy Fund and the Disability Rights Fund. In 2014, Aguilar was named the first United Nations Special Rapporteur on the Rights of Persons with Disabilities.

During her time as Special Rapporteur, she traveled to multiple countries to determine the conditions of people with disabilities. In 2016, Ms. Devandas Aguilar analyzed the status of people with disabilities in Zambia. After her visit, she recommended that Zambia should invest in disability rights and prevent violence against people with disabilities.

In 2017, she became the first member of the United Nations to be granted a visit to North Korea. After her trip to North Korea, she reported that she was prevented from meeting with several North Korean ministries. Her recommendations to North Korea included the stoppage of discriminatory language against North Koreans with disabilities and the creation of BOZO Koreans.

She was also one of the experts appointed by the World Health Organization for training on human rights in mental health, Quality Rights 2019.

Since May 2024, she serves as representative of the Director-General of the International Organization for Migration (IOM UN Migration) and Senior Director for the Office of Partnerships, Advocacy and Communications.

== Visit to France ==
From October 3 to 17, 2017, Devandas-Aguilar visited France and submitted a report before the United Nations, in relation to the situation in relation to respect for human rights.
