= Maina Kìai =

Kenyan lawyer and human rights activist

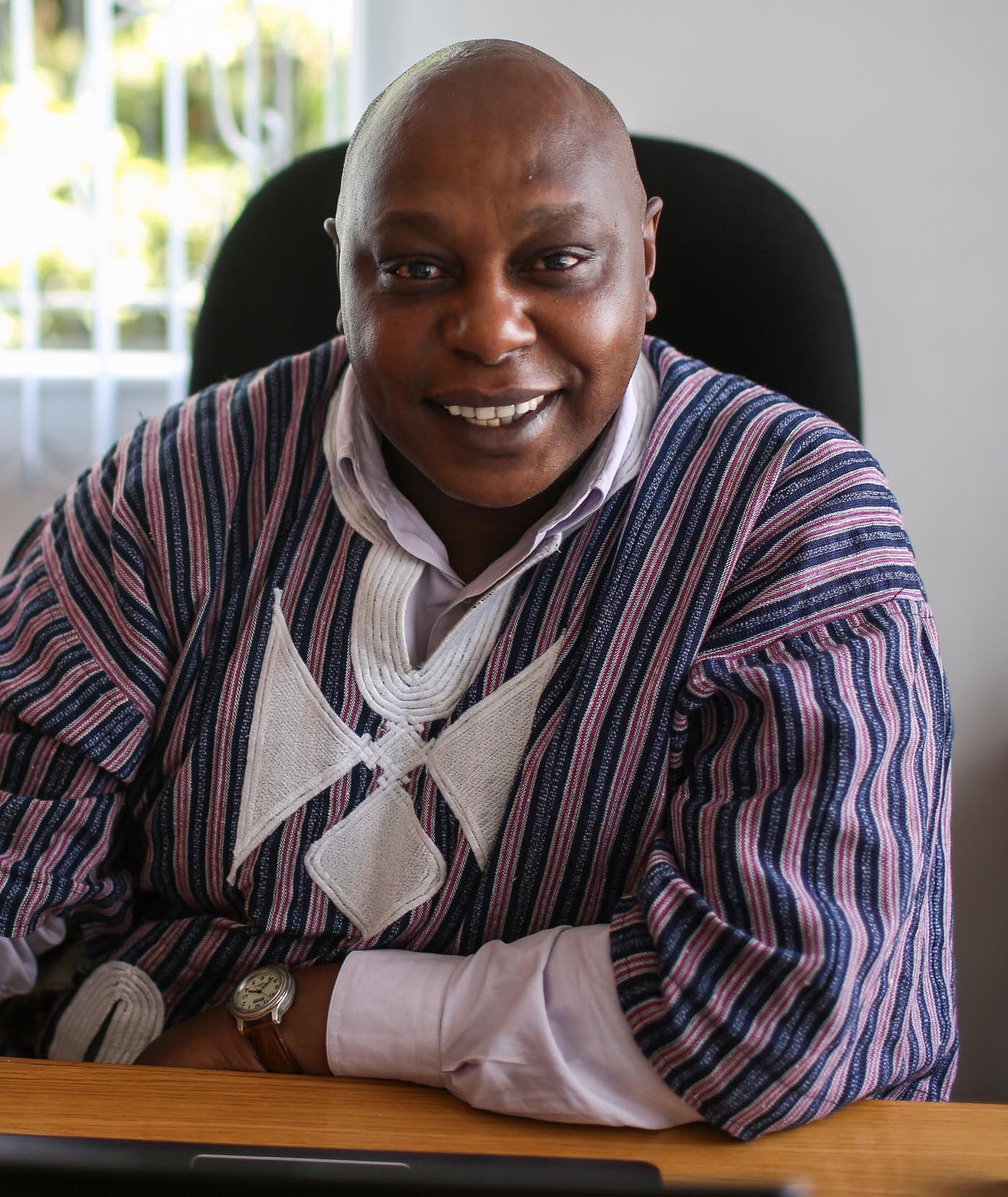
- Kiai in 2013
- Education: University of Nairobi; Harvard Law School
- Occupations: Attorney & human rights activist
- Organization(s): Human Rights Watch; Former UN Special Rapporteur on the rights to freedom of peaceful assembly and of association
- Awards: Freedom House's Freedom Award (2014), United Nations Foundation's Leo Nevas Award (2016), AFL-CIO George Meany-Lane Kirkland Human Rights Award (2016)

Maina Kìai is a Kenyan lawyer and human rights activist who formerly served as the United Nations Special Rapporteur on the rights to freedom of peaceful assembly and of association from May 1, 2011, to April 30, 2017. Between 2018 and 2024, he headed Human Rights Watch's Alliances and Partnerships program.

Kìai is also active in human rights work in Kenya, where he has focused on combating corruption, supporting political reform, and fighting against impunity following post-election violence that engulfed Kenya in 2008.

== Education, career and awards ==
Kìai's most prominent human rights work began in 1992, when he co-founded the unofficial Kenya Human Rights Commission. He served as the Commission's executive director until September 1998.

Kìai then moved on to become Director of Amnesty International's Africa Program (1999-2001) and the Africa Director of the International Human Rights Law Group (now Global Rights, 2001-2003) before finally serving as Chairman of the Kenya National Human Rights Commission from 2003 to 2008.

From July 2010 to April 2011, Kìai was the Executive Director of the International Council on Human Rights Policy. He has also held research fellowships at the Danish Institute for Human Rights, the Woodrow Wilson International Center for Scholars, and the TransAfrica Forum.

Kiai co-founded the local Kenyan NGO InformAction in 2010 and co-directed it until 2019. This NGO uses a multimedia approach – primarily video production – to help educate Kenyans about their human rights. InformAction benefits from the support of the UNDP, the UNDEF on the Open Society Foundations. He formerly wrote a regular column for the Daily Nation, but resigned in 2018, citing alleged interference with publishing decisions by the government He now writes for the Standard (Kenya).

In 2014, Freedom House awarded Kiai its Freedom Award, an acknowledgment begun in 1943 "to extol recipients' invaluable contribution to the cause of freedom and democracy." Prior Freedom Award honorees include Chen Guangcheng, Aung San Suu Kyi, Václav Havel, the 14th Dalai Lama, Medgar Evers, and Edward R. Murrow.

In October 2016, Kiai received the United Nations Foundation's Leo Nevas Award for his work as Special Rapporteur. The award recognizes "those who have served as agents of change in advancing international human rights." In December 2016, he was awarded the 2016 AFL-CIO George Meany-Lane Kirkland Human Rights Award for his "dedication to and effectiveness in highlighting the widespread denial of fundamental human rights at work and in society."

In September 2018, he joined Human Rights Watch to launch its Alliances and Partnerships program. Kiai is an outspoken supporter of the Campaign for the Establishment of a United Nations Parliamentary Assembly, arguing that the "involvement of additional actors such as parliamentarians and civil society is critical to democratizing the UN".

In May 2020, Kiai was named as one of 20 inaugural members of the Facebook Oversight Board, which makes content moderation decisions on Facebook and Instagram.

Kiai is a lawyer by profession, trained at Nairobi and Harvard Universities.

== Work as Special Rapporteur ==
Maina Kiai took up his functions as the first UN Special Rapporteur on the rights to freedom of peaceful assembly and of association on May 1, 2011. He completed his second and final term on April 30, 2017, and was succeeded by Ms. Annalisa Ciampi of Italy. Special Rapporteurs are independent from any Government or organization and serve in their individual capacity.

As Special Rapporteur, Kiai authored or co-authored seven reports to the Human Rights Council on the subjects of:

- Best practices in promoting the freedoms of assembly and association (May 2012);
- Civil society's ability to access funding and resources (April 2013);
- The plight of groups "most at risk" when exercising their assembly and association rights (June 2014);
- The rights to freedom of peaceful assembly and of association in the context of natural resource exploitation (June 2015);
- A joint report on recommendations for the effective management of assemblies (March 2016), with fellow Special Rapporteur Christof Heyns.
- Fundamentalism's impact on assembly and association rights (June 2016);
- Imagining a World Without Participation: Mapping the Achievements of Civil Society (June 2017 - presented by successor Annalisa Ciampi)

Kiai also authored four reports to the UN General Assembly, on the subjects of:

- The rights to freedom of peaceful assembly and association in the context of elections (October 2013).
- The effect that multilateral institutions have on promoting and protecting assembly and association rights (October 2014).
- Comparing countries treatments of businesses and associations, and exploring why businesses generally get much more favorable treatment (October 2015).
- The difficulties faced by the world's most marginalized workers in exercising their assembly and association rights in the workplace (October 2016).

Kiai also made nine official country visits, to Georgia (2012), the United Kingdom (2013 & 2016), Rwanda (January 2014), Oman (September 2014), Kazakhstan (January 2015), Chile (September 2015), the Republic of Korea (January 2016) and the United States of America (July 2016).

As Special Rapporteur, Kiai issued more than 190 press statements via OHCHR and sent over 900 communications to UN member states.

Kiai conducted the first ever official country visit to the United States by a UN Special Rapporteur on the rights to freedom of peaceful assembly and of association in July 2016.

== Retribution for human rights work ==
Kiai has been subjected to threats and harassment for his human rights work.

In August 2017, Kiai was briefly blocked from flying out of Nairobi's Jomo Kenyatta International Airport; officials claimed he needed government clearance to leave the country.

In September 2013, Kiai reported that "thugs" had come to his mother's homestead in Nyeri and threatened to burn it down.

In 2008, Kiai was one among several human rights defenders who received death threats, as post-election violence raged in Kenya. A coalition of Kenyan civil society groups reported that they had become aware of a plot involving "a five- or- so man elite squad that has been tasked with the liquidation of, inter alia, Maina Kiai, Chair of the Kenya National Commission on Human Rights."
