= Gina Romero =

Colombian activist (born 1988)

- Born: 1980 (age 45–46); Bogotá
- Education: Universidad Externado de Colombia
- Known for: United Nations special rapporteur on the freedom of peaceful assembly and association
- Predecessor: Clément Nyaletsossi Voule

Gina Paola Romero Rodríguez (born 1980) is a Colombian activist who co-founded the Latin American and Caribbean Network for Democracy. In 2024, she became the United Nations Special Rapporteur on the Freedom of Peaceful Assembly and Association.

== Her work as UN Special Rapporteur ==
Romero was born in the capital city of Colombia, Bogotá, in 1980. She studied Government and International Relations at the Universidad Externado de Colombia and earned a Master’s degree in Analysis of contemporary political, economic and international affairs from the Institut des Hautes Études d'Amérique Latine -IHEAL (Sorbonne Nouvelle - Paris 3) and Externado University.

Romero was a director of the Latin American and Caribbean Network for Democracy (known as REDLAD) which she had co-founded. In 2023 she and REDLAD were part of a call by Democracy Without Borders and 80 organizations to establish a new special rapporteur to look at human rights and democracy.

Romero was a member of the World Movement for Democracy's steering committee. She was chosen by the United Nations Human Rights Council to succeed Clément Nyaletsossi Voule from Togo in April 2024 as the United Nations Special Rapporteur looking at the human right of freedom of peaceful assembly and association. Her mandate as Special Rapporteur started on May 1, 2024.

In June 2024 Romero did her first presentation at the 56th session of the Human Rights Council, in Geneva, in which she presented three reports from his predecessor, Clement Voule. This included his report of a visit to Peru in May 2024.

And she participated in 8 side events:

- Side event presentation thematic report: Pushing back against attacks on civic space and growing authoritarianism, led by the Special Rapporteur; co-sponsored by the International Center for Non-for-profit Law, the World Movement for Democracy, Defend Defenders, Forum-Asia and with the support of Co-sponsoring states such as the Czech Republic, Republic of Lithuania, Swiss Confederation, República de Costa Rica, Estados Unidos de México.
- Weaponising the law: shutting down civic space perspectives from Asia: Organized by Asia Forum for Human Rights and Development FORUM-ASIA on June 27. The event provided information on the current and emerging trends of Freedom of Peaceful Assembly in Asia, presenting findings from the Repressive Laws Monitoring Report 2023.
- Far right movements and their implications on Human Rights: Organized by CELS, Connectas, FIDH, Amnesty International on June 27, to discuss the current human rights situation in Argentina, analyze its implications for democratic regimes and the enforcement of human rights, and propose regional and cross-regional strategies for strengthening democracy and rights-based policies in Latin America and Argentina.
- Rising Authoritarianism and its impact on Civil Society in Eastern Europe: Organized on July the 1st by Human Rights House Foundation. The event presented case studies from Bosnia and Herzegovina. Georgia and Azerbaijan, countries that have different political and human rights records, but are experiencing new or renewed human rights challenges related to growing authoritarianism.
- The quest for accountability for the violations of freedom of peaceful assembly and of association in Peru: Challenges and perspectives: Organized on July the 1st by Geneva Academy for International Humanitarian Law, Centre Europe – Tiers monde (CETIM), Red Wiphalas - Suiza. More information in this link.
- Recognizing the Right to Freedom of Assembly and Association for All Algerians - Without Discrimination on the Basis of Religion or Belief: organized on July 2 by the Jubilee Campaign and the European Centre for Law and Justice. Here is a note of systematization of the event made by the organizers. The video of the full event is included in the note.
