= Dorothy Estrada-Tanck =

Mexican academic

- Born: 1976 (age 49–50)
- Education: European University Institute et al
- Occupation: academic
- Employer: University of Murcia et al
- Predecessor: Alda Facio

Dorothy Estrada-Tanck (born 1976) is a Mexican academic who has worked in Spain. She has led the United Nations Working Group on discrimination against women and girls. She co-authored a report about the "gender apartheid" in Afghanistan which they considered a crime against humanity.

== Life ==
Estrada-Tanck was born in 1976. She graduated as a lawyer in Mexico City at the Escuela Libre de Derecho. She studied for her political theory master's degree at the London School of Economics and Political Science and her doctorate was from the European University Institute with a thesis titled "Human security and human rights under international law: reinforcing protection in the context of structural vulnerability". In 2016 she published Human Security and Human Rights under International Law: The Protections Offered to Persons Confronting Structural Vulnerability.

Estrada-Tanck works at the Spanish University of Murcia as a Tenured Professor of International Law and International Relations.

Estrada-Tanck was appointed by the United Nations to join the Working Group on Discrimination against Women and Girls in September 2020. She succeeded Alda Facio of Costa Rica and she joined a small group of experts including Claudia Flores. She became the group's chair in October 2022.

In 2023 the UN Human Rights Council received a joint report by Estrada-Tanck as Chair of the UN Working Group and Richard Bennett who was the Special Rapporteur on the situation of human rights in Afghanistan which they described a crime against humanity following a week-long visit to the country. The report addressed the discrimination of women in Afghanistan as it was then governed by the Taliban. They concluded that the current situation resulted in "total domination" and "gender apartheid". They highlighted this as the worst situation in the world for women and girls. Judges were quotedas saying that women probably deserved mistreatment when they complained in courts.

In June 2024, she was one of the many UN experts who spoke out against the sale of arms to Israel as a result of the conflict in Gaza. The experts cautioned arms suppliers and finance companies that they would be implicated in human rights violations. The list included the members of her UN working group and special reporteurs Attiya Waris, Paula Gaviria Betancur, Tlaleng Mofokeng, Mary Lawlor, Astrid Puentes Riaño, Margaret Satterthwaite and Francesca Albanese.

On International Women's Day in 2024 she joined a panel which included Nayera Kohistani of Afghanistan, the Maltese politician Vanessa Frazier, Penelope Andrews and Nobel Laureate Malala Yousafzai moderated by CNN's Jomana Karadsheh. The panel highlighted what Nayera Kohistani called the criminalisation of gender in Afghanistan. She asked the international community to consider "where are we going to draw the red line?"
