= Attiya Waris =

Lecturer at Nairobi University, writer about corporate tax reform

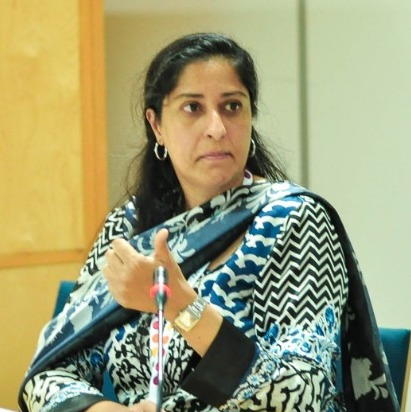
- Waris in 2018
- Born: 25 October 1974 (age 51); Nairobi, Kenya
- Education: University of Lancaster, Pretoria, London and Nairobi
- Occupations: Professor, researcher and writer
- Employer: University of Nairobi
- Known for: Tax avoidance and human rights, llicit financial flows, fiscal law

Attiya Waris (born 25 October 1974) is a Kenyan professor at the University of Nairobi and a writer about financing development from diverse perspectives including illicit financial flows and reform of corporate tax. She became the UN Independent Expert on Foreign Debt and Human Rights in 2021. She is the Chair of the Supervisory Board of the Capabuild Foundation and a Commissioner on the Lancet-O’Neil Commission on Racism and Structural Discrimination in Health.

== Life ==
Waris was born in on 25 October 1974. She earned her first degree at the University of Nairobi. She speaks English, Waris took her master's degrees in 2002 at the University of London and in 2004 at the University of Pretoria. Her doctorate in Tax Law was awarded by Lancaster University in 2009 following a thesis on "Solving the Fiscal Crisis: Re-legitimising the Fiscal State through the Realisation of Human Rights A Case Study of the Kenyan Constituency Development Fund" supervised by Sol Picciotto. From 2007 to 2013, she was vice-chair of the

Waris is an expert on tax avoidance and she appeared in the documentary film The Spider's Web: Britain's Second Empire.

In 2013 she co-authored a book on "Tax Justice".

The Irish Times quoted her opinions in 2019 when Apple were order to pay $13 billion in avoided tax to the Irish government by the European Commission in 2016. Waris argued that human rights were being ignored given that the Irish government were appealing the decision and to allow Apple to avoid a lower corporate tax rate. Waris said the “People are so busy not watching information and too busy entertaining themselves. The lower tax rate was creating an environment in which countries like Kenya could not compete because Ireland was offering Apple tax rates that were below the cost of supplying service to the company. She argues that Ireland's tax authorities are run by the upper classes who have forgotten the plight of their country's poor.

She became the sixth UN Independent Expert on Foreign Debt and Human Rights in 2021 taking over from Yuefen Li of China. In June 2024, Waris was one of the many UN experts who spoke out against the sale of arms to Israel as a result of the conflict in Gaza. The experts cautioned arms suppliers and finance companies that they would be implicated in human rights violations. The list included special reporteurs Reem Alsalem, Paula Gaviria Betancur, Tlaleng Mofokeng, Mary Lawlor, Margaret Satterthwaite and Francesca Albanese.
