= Claudia Flores =

Serbian-born American law Professor

Claudia M. Flores
- Born: 1975 (age 50–51); Belgrade, Serbia
- Occupation: law professor
- Employer(s): Chicago University, Yale University
- Known for: member of the UN Working Group on discrimination against women and girls
- Predecessor: Elizabeth Broderick on UN Working group

Claudia M. Flores is a Serbian-born American law Professor at Yale University. She is a member of the United Nations Working Group on discrimination against women and girls.

== Life ==
Flores was born in Belgrade in 1975. She graduated from the University of Chicago in 1997 and in 2002 she left the New York University School of Law in Manhattan with a Juris Doctor.

She was employed by the Chicago School of Law, her alma mater, as a Clinical Professor of Law and the Director of their Global Human Rights Clinic. At the clinic, Yale students work on real human rights cases. Flores was a visiting professor at Yale University. She and the Global Human Rights Clinic investigated the advice given to Alericam police after Amnesty found that there appeared to be no national or state advice. The students gathered the information for different states over six months. Flores and the Global Human Rights Clinic published a report about the use of force by American police forces titled Deadly Force: Police Use of Lethal Force in the United States. The report says that the police do not comply with international law concerning human rights.

She was appointed by the United Nations to join the Working Group on Discrimination against Women and Girls in 2023. She succeeded Elizabeth Broderick of Australia and she joined a small group of experts including Dorothy Estrada-Tanck who became the group's chair in October 2022.

In February 2022, she attended a human rights workshop at Yale as a visiting professor. Flores became a law professor at Yale University. She leads the Allard K. Lowenstein International Human Rights Clinic and the Orville H. Schell Jr. Center for International Human Rights at Yale.

In June 2024, she was one of the many UN experts who spoke out against the sale of arms to Israel as a result of the conflict in Gaza. The experts cautioned arms suppliers and finance companies that they would be implicated in human rights violations. The list included special reporteurs Reem Alsalem, Paula Gaviria Betancur, Tlaleng Mofokeng, Mary Lawlor, Astrid Puentes Riaño, Margaret Satterthwaite and Francesca Albanese. In August she was one of many UN Special Rapporteurs who signed an open letter to the "International community" on the third anniversary of the Taliban taking change in Afghanistan. They were concerned that the regime's human-rights abuses particularly against women and girls may become accepted. They encouraged the International Criminal Court to take urgent action against those responsible.
