= Christa Pike =

American murderer on death row (born 1976)

- Mugshot of Pike in 2023
- Born: Christa Gail Pike; March 10, 1976 (age 50); Beckley, West Virginia, U.S.
- Status: Incarcerated on death row
- Motive: Jealousy
- Convictions: 3 counts (Note: Christa Pike's three convictions are: First degree murder – Colleen Slemmer; Conspiracy to commit first-degree murder – Colleen Slemmer; Attempted first-degree murder – Patricia Jones)
- Penalty: Death plus 25 years imprisonment

Details
- Date: January 12, 1995 (Slemmer); August 24, 2001 (Jones)
- Country: United States
- State: Tennessee
- Locations: Knoxville (1995); Nashville (2001)
- Killed: Colleen Slemmer
- Injured: Patricia Jones
- Weapons: Box cutter, meat cleaver and chunk of asphalt (1995); Shoe-string (2001)
- Date apprehended: January 14, 1995; 31 years ago
- Imprisoned at: Debra K. Johnson Rehabilitation Center, Nashville, Tennessee

Christa Gail Pike (born March 10, 1976) is an American convicted murderer on death row in Tennessee. In 1995, when she was 18, Pike and her boyfriend lured their 19-year-old classmate Colleen Slemmer into a wooded area in Knoxville where they tortured and killed her. Slemmer was beaten, slashed, and had a pentagram carved in her chest before Pike killed her by crushing her skull. Pike was arrested within two days and sentenced to death in 1996 at the age of 20, making her one of the youngest women to receive a death sentence in the United States during the post-Furman period.

Pike spent her prison time in solitary confinement at the Debra K. Johnson Rehabilitation Center in Nashville. She was scheduled to be executed via lethal injection on September 30, 2026, but she survived the attempt after two rounds of pentobarbital failed to kill her. Pike was subsequently hospitalized in critical condition at Vanderbilt University Medical Center in Nashville. She was unconscious, on a ventilator and intubated for nearly a week, and by October 5, her lawyers believed she was brain dead. However, she regained consciousness on October 6, and was discharged from the hospital and returned to prison on October 10. It is unknown whether another attempt will be made to execute her. The failed execution was the second for the state in 2026, prompting the Tennessee Department of Correction commissioner to resign and Governor Bill Lee to place a moratorium on executions for the remainder of the year.

Pike's sentence remains controversial, as some experts have stated that her legal defense failed to present mitigating evidence at trial, including the effect of her youth and childhood trauma on her decision-making abilities. Her lawyers alleged that this evidence would have been relevant for the jury to decide whether she should have been sentenced to death. Several human rights advocacy groups and United Nations special rapporteurs have called on Tennessee to commute her sentence.

== Early life ==
Christa Gail Pike was born on March 10, 1976, in Beckley, West Virginia. She was neglected by alcoholic parents, and her attorneys said she had been exposed to alcohol in the womb. She was raped as a toddler and again at ages 11 and 17. She attempted suicide at the age of 12 and in 1991 she was sent to the Juvenile Evaluation Center in Swannanoa, North Carolina, after breaking the terms of her probation, which she had been placed on for breaking into a community center to steal candy.

The center was designed to reform troubled youth. Children earned or lost points based on compliance with rules, and their progress through the program depended on those points. It was promoted as an alternative to more punitive forms of juvenile incarceration. By the 1990s, however, the center had become increasingly punitive, relying on a uniform points‑and‑punishment system rather than behavioral change.

The program proved ineffective for Pike: she repeatedly violated rules, generally in minor ways, and remained there for more than a year, far longer than most other minors. In the months leading up to her arrival at the center, North Carolina social services had temporarily removed her from her home after her mother's live‑in boyfriend physically and sexually abused her. During her time at Swannanoa, she became a teacher's assistant and earned her GED. She was released from the juvenile center in March 1993 and enrolled in a Job Corps program in Knoxville, Tennessee.

== Murder of Colleen Slemmer ==
Colleen Slemmer

Born September 20, 1975, in Orange Park, Florida, Colleen Slemmer was studying computer technology at the Job Corps at the suggestion of her grandfather, who noted her technical proficiency with computers.

Pike, a classmate, became convinced that Slemmer was trying to steal her boyfriend, 17-year-old Tadaryl Shipp. According to trial testimony, Pike devised a plan to confront Slemmer. Prosecutors said the intent was to kill her, while Pike told police she had meant only to fight her. On the evening of January 12, 1995, Pike, Shipp and their friend, 18-year-old Shadolla Peterson, left the Job Corps dormitory with Slemmer and led her to a steam plant on the University of Tennessee campus.

There, Pike and Shipp attacked Slemmer, while Peterson stood watch. Over the next 30 minutes to an hour, as Slemmer pleaded with them to stop, she was beaten, cut with a box cutter and a meat cleaver, her throat was slashed multiple times, and a pentagram was cut into her chest. Finally, Pike beat Slemmer's head with a large chunk of asphalt, killing her. Slemmer was 19 years old.

Following the attack, Pike, Shipp, and Peterson returned to the Job Corps dormitory. Pike had taken a fragment of Slemmer's skull from the scene, and the next morning she showed it to other Job Corps students. The same morning, University of Tennessee employees found Slemmer's body. Police identified Pike, Shipp, and Peterson within days, and all three were arrested. When arrested, both Pike and Shipp were wearing pentagram necklaces, and Shipp told police there was satanic paraphernalia in his dorm room. The pentagram and other case details drew wide attention at the time and extensive news coverage, occurring amid the Satanic panic of the 1980s and 1990s.

Slemmer's mother, May Martinez, repeatedly asked Tennessee authorities to return the fragment of skull for proper burial, but it remained in the state's possession as evidence. Authorities stated they would not return it while the case remained open, awaiting Pike's execution. In a documentary that premiered September 2026 ahead of Pike's potential execution, Dead Woman Walking: Pike vs. Tennessee, Slemmer's mother confirmed that after 16 years of fighting and writing letters, she had received the skull from the state of Tennessee, however she has still not received "the last piece of her daughter's skull".

== Trial and appeals ==
=== Trial ===
Pike, Shipp, and Peterson were all charged with first-degree murder and conspiracy to commit first-degree murder. Shipp, who had turned 17 two months before the murder, was tried as an adult. Peterson, who agreed to become a witness for the prosecution, received probation after pleading guilty to being an accessory after the fact. The prosecution sought a death sentence for Pike and life in prison without parole for Shipp. Before trial, the prosecution offered Pike a sentence of life imprisonment without parole in exchange for a guilty plea, which was not accepted.

The jury found Pike guilty of first-degree murder and conspiracy to commit murder. On March 30, 1996, Pike was sentenced to death by electrocution.

In January 1997, Shipp was also found guilty on both counts. The judge sentenced him to life imprisonment with parole eligibility. Describing Shipp as a dangerous individual, the judge imposed a consecutive 25-year sentence for his conspiracy conviction, ensuring that he would not become eligible for parole until he was in his late 40s or early 50s. Shipp first came up for parole in October 2025, and was denied. Tennessee's parole board scheduled his second parole hearing to take place in October 2031.

=== Domestic appeals ===
On direct appeal, the Supreme Court of Tennessee affirmed the conviction and sentence of Pike in 1998.

Pike then "launched, cancelled and then re-launched" an appeal of her conviction in the Tennessee state courts. In June 2001, then again in June 2002, against the advice of her lawyers, Pike asked the courts to drop her appeal and sought to be executed via electrocution. Criminal Court judge Mary Beth Leibowitz granted the request, and an execution date of August 19, 2002, was set.

Pike soon changed her mind, and on July 8, 2002, defense lawyers filed a motion to allow the appeal process to continue. This motion was denied. On August 2, 2002, a three-judge state appeals court panel ruled that the proceedings should be continued, and the execution was not carried out. In December 2008, Pike's latest request for a new trial was turned down, and she was returned to death row. This decision was affirmed in 2011 by the Court of Criminal Appeals of Tennessee.

In May 2014, Pike's lawyers entered an appeal in the federal court system. They sought a commutation of the sentence from death to prison on the following grounds: ineffective assistance of counsel; mental illness; and the unconstitutionality of the death penalty as administered in Tennessee. In a 61-page ruling issued on March 11, 2016, by U.S. District Judge Harry Sandlin Mattice Jr., all grounds were rejected, and the requested commutation was denied.

On August 22, 2019, having heard the same appeal on October 1, 2018, the three-judge panel on the United States Court of Appeals for the Sixth Circuit unanimously upheld the lower court ruling and denied relief.

== Life on death row ==
After Pike's trial, the Tennessee Department of Correction adopted a policy requiring death row inmates to be held in maximum-security conditions. As such, Pike was held at the Debra K. Johnson Rehabilitation Center in Nashville in solitary confinement from 1996 until 2024.

While in prison Pike was treated with Prozac for obsessive-compulsive disorder; she was also diagnosed with bipolar disorder.

Pike sued the Tennessee Department of Correction in 2022 over the conditions of her confinement, which she argued constituted cruel and unusual punishment. Her lawyer wrote, "For the last nearly 30 years, Ms. Pike has been subjected to solitary confinement in a cell the size of a parking space, where she has had nearly no meaningful human contact." The lawsuit noted that while male death row inmates were kept separate from the general population, they were still allowed to socialize and work together. Due to the fact that Pike is the only woman sentenced to death in Tennessee, she had arbitrarily been de-facto kept in solitary confinement. The state settled the lawsuit in September 2024, agreeing to equalize Pike's treatment with men on death row, including a job, shared meals with other incarcerated women, and more time out of her cell.

=== Attempted murder of Patricia Jones ===
Pike was accused of attacking and attempting to strangle fellow inmate Patricia Jones with a shoestring on August 24, 2001, during a fire-related evacuation. At the time of the attack, Jones had been serving a life sentence for the 1994 murder of 84-year-old Alberta Coker in Knoxville. Pike said she was trying to protect another inmate, Natasha Cornett. Pike was convicted of attempted first degree murder on August 12, 2004 and sentenced to 25 years in prison.

Jones later testified that Pike had intervened in a fight between Jones and another inmate and likely saved the other woman's life. At Pike's appeal, Appellate Judge John Everett Williams said that "her stated intention was to protect" convicted killer Natasha Cornett, but also said that "there was ample evidence by her actions and [Pike's] own words that contradicted this position."

=== Attempted prison escape ===
In March 2012, it was revealed Pike had made escape plans involving Justin Heflin, a 23-year-old corrections officer, and Donald Kohut, a 34-year-old personal trainer from New Jersey. Kohut had entered into a letter-writing correspondence with Pike around the beginning of 2011. By July of that year, Kohut was making the nearly 1,700 mi (2,700 km) round trip from Flemington, New Jersey, to Nashville, Tennessee, to visit Pike in person once or twice a month. Eventually, Kohut communicated an escape plan to Pike and enlisted the help of Heflin by bribing him.

Because of security concerns, the Tennessee Department of Corrections has not provided many details about the plan; however, the indictment laid out a scenario where a prison key would be traced and then a duplicate created. Prison authorities became aware of their plan in January 2012, leading to a joint investigation involving the Tennessee Department of Corrections, the Tennessee Bureau of Investigation (TBI) and the New Jersey State Police. According to the TBI, the plan was not very far along when it was discovered, and "the jailbreak was not imminent".

In March 2012, Kohut was arrested and charged with bribery and conspiracy to commit escape, while Heflin was arrested and charged with bribery, official misconduct, and conspiracy to commit escape. Pike was not charged in connection with the alleged conspiracy. Investigators said it was unclear whether she was a participant in the conspiracy beyond her awareness of the scheme. On May 31, 2012, Kohut was sentenced to seven years in prison to be served at the Tennessee State Northeast Correctional Complex. He was released in 2018. Heflin, who cooperated with authorities after his arrest, served no prison time, but was terminated from his job with the Tennessee Department of Corrections.

== 2026 execution attempt ==
=== Death warrant ===
On August 27, 2020, the office of Tennessee attorney general Herbert Slatery asked the Tennessee Supreme Court to set an execution date for Pike. Because of the COVID-19 pandemic in Tennessee and other factors, Pike's attorneys received extensions from the court, giving them more time to argue why Pike should not be executed. The state did not oppose the extensions. On June 7, 2021, Pike's attorneys filed a motion opposing the execution date and requesting a Certificate of Commutation on the grounds of mental illness. The motion was denied.

Before November 2022, Pike had exhausted all appeals. That month, however, the Tennessee Supreme Court ruled in State v. Booker that the state's law mandating life sentences without parole for juveniles in homicide cases was unconstitutional. On the basis of this decision, on August 30, 2023, Pike's lawyers filed a motion to reopen her appeals in an attempt to overturn her 1996 conviction and sentence. They argued that the Court's reasoning in Booker applies to all youthful defendants, not just minors, and that Pike's young age and mental health struggles at the time of the killing should spare her from execution.

In October 2023, Knox County Criminal Court judge Scott Green denied the request, saying that the ruling in Booker did not apply to her. Green noted that the Tennessee Supreme Court's opinion in Booker, written by Justice Sharon Lee, specifically stated "This ruling applies only to juvenile homicide offenders – not to adult offenders", and that Pike was legally an adult at the time of the murder. On September 30, 2025, the Tennessee Supreme Court issued a death warrant scheduling Pike's execution for September 30, 2026. Pike was given the option to choose between electrocution or lethal injection.

=== Public response to scheduled execution ===
Her scheduled execution received many criticisms due to Pike's history of childhood sexual abuse and mental illness, which drew comparisons to the highly publicized trial of Lindsay Clancy. Pike said in an interview with The Times that she felt a kinship with Clancy: "We are both females who got into trouble because of uniquely female issues. One thing is different, however, is that times have changed a lot on awareness of women's issues since I was put on trial."

Sandra Babcock, a professor at Cornell University who specializes in gender and the death penalty, said Pike's history of abuse should have been presented in court, particularly considering Pike's age at the time and the fact that she had been raped a year before the killing. Babcock said "I don’t think she would ever face the death penalty today."

Several non-governmental organizations and human rights organizations have spoken out against Pike's execution. Cornell Law School's Center on the Death Penalty Worldwide characterized Pike's requested commutation as "an act of mercy. A sentence of life imprisonment would be consistent with Tennessee’s treatment of Tadaryl Shipp". Amnesty International also called for a halt to Pike's execution. The Advocates for Human Rights called Pike's sentence "unjust and unethical".

In September 2026, the Inter-American Commission on Human Rights published their Admissibility and Merits Report on Pike's case, which had been transmitted to the U.S. in October 2025, and stated that based on their findings they had "concluded that the United States is responsible for violating Christa Pike’s rights to life, liberty and personal security, equality before the law, preservation of health and well-being, fair trial, protection from arbitrary arrest, and due process of law" as set forth in the American Declaration of the Rights and Duties of Man, and urged the United States to "protect her life and personal integrity, refrain from carrying out the death penalty, and ensure that her detention conditions comply with international standards."

Special rapporteurs from the United Nations, including Reem Alsalem (Violence Against Women And Girls), Pau Pérez-Sales (Torture and Other Cruel, Inhuman or Degrading Treatment), Morris Tidball-Binz (Extrajudicial, Summary or Arbitrary Executions), and Mariângela Batista Galvão Simão (Right to Physical and Mental Health), called on the governments of the United States and Tennessee to stop Pike's execution. Several members of the United Nations Working Group on discrimination against women and girls (Claudia Flores, Ivana Kostić, Dorothy Estrada-Tanck, and Laura Nyirinkindi) also called on authorities not to execute Pike.

In September 2026, Slemmer's mother expressed support for Pike's execution, saying: "She did the crime. I think she should pay for it ... I would feel better that she felt the same pain that Colleen did" and "I just want [Pike] down so I can end it, relieve my daughter, so she [Slemmer] finally can be resting."

=== Final appeals ===
In June 2026, after the failed execution by lethal injection of Tony Carruthers, Pike challenged the execution protocol, alleging that the state could not guarantee a constitutionally compliant execution. She argued that her thrombocytosis (a blood-clotting disorder) would complicate intravenous (IV) cannula placement and increase her risk of suffering, and that transferring her to Riverbend Maximum Security Institution, where an all-male team of correctional officers would observe her during the two weeks before her execution, would cause her psychological harm due to her history of sexual assault.

In August 2026, a special master for the Tennessee Supreme Court declined to intervene, stating that Pike's legal team had not convinced him of the alleged risks related to her PTSD and blood-clotting disorder. Her attorneys argued that these conditions could complicate the execution and cause pain and suffering, violating her constitutional rights. Pike also asked to be executed by hanging, believing a potential botched hanging would be less painful than a botched lethal injection. The state denied the request because hanging is not an approved execution method in Tennessee and the death chamber is not equipped for it.

Pike's attorneys subsequently challenged Tennessee's lethal injection protocol in the Tennessee Supreme Court, arguing that execution via lethal injection in light of her thrombocytosis condition would constitute cruel and unusual punishment in violation of the Eighth Amendment. Pike also further argued that being subjected to observation by male guards in her final hours, being physically restrained to a gurney, and having intravenous lines established near her chest and groin areas would subject her to psychological harm due to her underlying bipolar disorder and PTSD from past sexual abuse. The Tennessee Supreme Court rejected this constitutional challenge on September 23, 2026, a week prior to Pike's scheduled execution. Pike's attorneys also filed a 226-page clemency petition with Tennessee governor Bill Lee asking him to commute her sentence to life imprisonment. On September 28, 2026, Lee denied Pike's clemency petition. Additionally, Pike sought constitutional relief from her death sentence in front of the U.S. Supreme Court, but on September 29 the court declined Pike's request, leaving her without any further appeals.

As Pike had requested an all‑female execution team, Tennessee allowed certain accommodations. Female corrections officers would transport Pike to Riverbend Maximum Security Institution one day prior to the execution. While on death watch, the state would attempt to have only female corrections officers observe her, and she would receive privacy screens for dressing, showering, and using the restroom. Pike would also be allowed to meet with a spiritual adviser in the 12 hours before the execution, and the adviser would be permitted to accompany her in the death chamber. On September 29, Pike declined to select a last meal.

If executed, Pike would be the 19th woman executed nationwide since 1976 and the first woman to be executed in Tennessee in roughly 200 years. On September 30, approximately one hour before the scheduled execution, the U.S. Court of Appeals for the Sixth Circuit stayed her execution; her attorney said the court had "serious concerns" about the execution. Later that day in an unsigned statement, the United States Supreme Court overturned the stay order and allowed the execution to move forward.

=== Botched execution ===
The execution procedure was conducted at Riverbend Maximum Security Institution in Nashville, Tennessee. Pike, aged 50, was the first woman in Tennessee since at least 1820 to undergo an execution procedure, successfully or otherwise. (Note: The year 1820 refers to the alleged execution of Eve Martin. Other sources give the execution of an unnamed black woman in 1819 as the last execution of a woman in Tennessee. Pike's attorneys have argued that the alleged 1820 execution was a case of mistaken identity. A 2008 study found that Martin was the victim of the murder, not the perpetrator.)

Witnesses were led into the execution room at 6:41 pm CDT on September 30. The blinds opened at 7:26 pm, revealing Pike on the gurney with the IV cannula already placed in her arm. According to her attorney, prison officials had spent over an hour trying to establish an IV line, a process which involved at least seven needles on several sites in her arm, and they had warned that some of her veins seemed to have ruptured. Pike made what was expected to be her final statement at 7:30 p.m., saying "I just want to say that I'm going to leave this world the way I spent most of my life, and that is with love." She said that she loved both her supporters and those who hated her and stated, "I'm at peace and I'm ready to go." Pike then sang "I Love You So Much" with her spiritual adviser.

Per state protocol, she was administered what was believed to be a lethal dose of the drug pentobarbital. At 7:34 pm, Pike complained of pain in her arm: "The vein in my arm feels like it's about to bust." She later blinked, smiled, and laughed, and lifted her head and looked toward her left arm. Around 7:39 pm, she kicked off the sheet that covered her. At 7:41 pm, according to Molly Davis of The Tennessean, a "small white rock appeared in a window in the wall", believed to be "a signal that a round of deadly drugs has been pushed through the IV lines". The blinds closed at 7:46 pm. Under the Tennessee Department of Correction's lethal injection protocol, if the person remains alive five minutes after the first injection, a second injection is to be administered.

The blinds were soon reopened and Pike was still seen moving, according to her attorney. The curtains were drawn a second time at 8:05/8:06 pm. The execution protocol does not say what should happen if the person remains alive after the second injection. Her attorney Randy Spivey could hear her breathing and asked permission to call the other members of his legal team. At about 8:15 pm, Spivey was escorted through a half-dozen locked doors. He reached a telephone at about 8:22 pm, but the emergency contacts at the Tennessee Supreme Court and the governor's office did not pick up. Public defender Amy Harwell drove to the Tennessee Supreme Court with an emergency motion to stay her execution and seek medical care for her. The court began a brief hearing at 8:50 pm. Meanwhile, media witnesses were escorted out of the Riverbend prison at 8:53 pm. They stated that Pike was snoring.

Pike's attorneys filed motions in two other courts, telling the Eastern District of Tennessee that she did not appear to lose consciousness and needed medical care, and similarly filing a motion in the Sixth Circuit court. Pike was taken in an ambulance to Vanderbilt University Medical Center. The Tennessee Supreme Court hearing ended at 9:05 pm, with the judges noting that Pike's lawyers' request to have her hospitalized had become moot, as she was already hospitalized.

The next day, Pike's lawyer said she was in critical condition in the hospital, and the following day, her lawyers further revealed that she was unconscious, intubated on a ventilator and that both of her arms were swollen, blistered and burned. By October 5, her lawyers said that she was considered brain-dead and said they expected her life support to be disconnected. However, on the following day, October 6, Pike regained consciousness and spoke. According to her lawyers, she was suffering from pneumonia, could not swallow, and had a blood clot in one arm. They also stated that upon awakening, her first words were, "where am I and who are you?" and she was "very aware the state tried to execute her". Pike's attorneys later raised concerns about her being "handcuffed and shackled" to her hospital bed against medical advice. On October 8 in an interview with the BBC, a lawyer for Pike noted she had regained limited mobility. "She is up and walking for the first time today, but just around the room, not very far." On October 10, her lawyers released a statement that she had been discharged from the hospital and moved back to Debra K. Johnson Rehabilitation Center.

=== Aftermath ===
==== Pike's status ====
According to the Death Penalty Information Center and other sources, Pike is the first person to survive a state-ordered lethal injection procedure after the lethal drug was administered. It is expected that there will be extensive legal argument over whether the state is allowed to make another attempt to execute her.

On October 30, Pike released her first public statement since the botched execution. In the statement, she said that she had "woke[n] up alone in a hospital confused and in pain" but that she was recovering.

==== Tennessee governance ====
This was the second failed execution in 2026 in Tennessee. The same doctor in both cases, Mark Walton Fowler, had previously failed to secure a central line for the execution of Tony Carruthers, who was granted a one-year reprieve. Immediately following the failed execution attempt of Pike, Tennessee governor Bill Lee ordered a "comprehensive, third-party review to determine exactly what occurred" and halted the December 3, 2026, scheduled execution of Gary Wayne Sutton, the only remaining execution in 2026. He added that "a lawfully imposed sentence is among that State's most serious responsibilities, and the people of Tennessee expect it to be done in a manner that is not only legal and constitutional, but is effective." The state did not immediately inform Pike's lawyers whether it intended to execute her after completing the review.

On October 3, three days after the failed execution, Lee announced that Tennessee Commissioner of Correction Frank Strada, the head of the state's prison system, had submitted his resignation and would leave office later that month. Strada had headed the state's Department of Correction since January 2023. It was the second botched execution he had overseen in 2026, the first being the failed lethal injection of Carruthers in May. Prior to working for Tennessee, Strada had been the deputy director of the Arizona Department of Corrections, where he had also overseen three botched lethal injections in 2022, which led Governor Katie Hobbs to halt executions and order an investigation into the state's protocols.

In announcing his resignation, Strada said that stepping aside was "in the best interests" of Tennessee while the independent review proceeded and said that he intended to cooperate with the investigation. He maintained that the department had carried out its responsibilities in accordance with the established execution protocol. Immediately after the execution attempt, the Department of Correction had similarly stated that it had followed every step of Tennessee's approved execution protocol and that the protocol did not authorize additional procedures beyond those performed that evening.

Lee accepted Strada's resignation, stating that Strada had "served with integrity" and thanking him for placing the interests of Tennessee residents first during the controversy. The governor's office said that an interim commissioner would be named. Pike's attorneys described Strada's resignation as justified but argued that responsibility for the failed execution extended beyond a single official. In a statement following the announcement, they characterized the incident as a systemic failure and called for the independent investigation to examine Tennessee's broader administration of capital punishment.

On October 7, Davidson County judge I'Ashea Myles ordered the state to preserve all evidence—including log books, medical waste, and all messages sent and received by Pike—about the attempted execution.

==== Reactions ====
The failed execution sparked international reactions. UN high commissioner for human rights Volker Türk called for the cancellation of Pike's execution, stating that "the death penalty has no place in any society". Maya Foa, CEO of the UK–based anti-death penalty organization Reprieve, said: "We cannot know exactly what went wrong, because so much happened behind a curtain – lethal injection relies on secrecy at every stage, to hide the violence of the state taking a human life." Amnesty International called on Lee to commute the death sentences of Pike and all other prisoners on death row in Tennessee.

The New York Times published an op-ed by anesthesiologist and intensive care physician Joel Zivot, in which he discusses the possible mechanics of the lethal injection failure, and writes that: "Gov. Bill Lee has said that as far as he knows, the Department of Correction followed its protocol exactly. I take him at his word. That is the problem. Lethal injection failures are not glitches; they are features of the process."

== In popular culture ==
The murder of Colleen Slemmer was featured on the TV shows Deadly Women, For My Man, Killer Kids, Martinis and Murder, Death by Gossip with Wendy Williams, Snapped: Killer Couples, and Mean Girl Murders. Pike was also featured in a season one episode of World's Most Dangerous Criminals. Patricia Springer wrote a book about the murder titled A Love To Die For in 2000, 5 years after it happened.

Pike and her legal team's fight to stop her execution was featured in the Criminally Obsessed documentary Dead Woman Walking: Pike vs. Tennessee. The documentary premiered on September 18, 2026, just twelve days before Christa's scheduled execution attempt, and features an exclusive death row interview from Pike, interviews with her legal team, and an interview with Slemmer's mother, May Martinez.

== See also ==
- List of botched executions
- List of death row inmates in the United States § Tennessee
- List of women on death row in the United States
- Willie Francis
