= Nayera Kohistani =

Afghan women's rights activist

- Born: Afghanistan
- Occupation: schoolteacher

Nayera Kohistani is an Afghan women's rights activist. She lived through the first Taliban rule in her country. She was a protester when they came to power again. She left the country in 2022 after being imprisoned and she is a prominent protester against the "gender apartheid" and criminalisation of gender in Afghanistan.

== Life ==
Kohistani was born in Afghanistan and she was one of the last generation of women in Afghanistan to have a secondary and higher education. She was very young when the Taliban had their first period of rule in her country. Schools were burned and her father was mistreated. After she completed her education she was employed by NGOs in Afghanistan. In 2004 the constitution of the country was changed to add measures to improve gender equality. This was possible because of fall of the Taliban and the 2001 Bonn agreement changes and it also allowed Kohistani and her peers to complete their high school education and to graduate from university.

In 2021 Kabul again came under the control of the Taliban. She stood in a queue outside the passport office while Taliban supporters whipped those who were queueing. She joined protests even though she knew that they were under surveillance. She had left her children with her mother knowing that she may not see them again. She says that about 50 people were in the protests. Tamana Zarriab Paryani was arrested and Kohistani was among those who were wanted for questioning. Despite using safe houses and code names when talking to friends she was arrested. When she was released and continued her covert activities she felt in danger of re-arrest. She left Afghanistan in May 2022 with only her son for company as they were the only people in her family with passports.

In September 2023 she joined a group of women who started a hunger strike that lasted for ten days to protest the treatment of women in Afghanistan. Her fellow protesters included leading Afghan campaigners Tamana Zaryab Paryani and Wahida Amiri. The Human Rights Council received a joint report by Special Rapporteurs Dorothy Estrada-Tanck and Richard Bennett concerning the discrimination of women in Afghanistan as it was then, again, governed by the Taliban. They concluded that the situation resulted in "gender apartheid". Afghanistan was judged the worst situation in the world for women and girls.

On International Women's Day in 2024 Kohistani joined a panel which included Dorothy Estrada-Tanck, the Maltese ambassador Vanessa Frazier, Professor Penelope Andrews and Nobel Laureate Malala Yousafzai moderated by CNN's Jomana Karadsheh. The panel highlighted what Nayera Kohistani called the "criminalisation of gender" in Afghanistan. Kohistani asked the international community to consider "where are we going to draw the red line?" The next day her story was being reported, She noted that the authorities in her country had denied access to education to millions of girls like her own daughter.
