= Jomana =

Jomana is a feminine given name. Notable people with the name include:

- Jomana Alrashid, Saudi media executive
- Jomana Elmaghrabi (born 1995), Egyptian synchronized swimmer
- Jomana Karadsheh, Jordanian-born journalist
