= List of Judicial Fellows of the International Court of Justice =

"Judicial Fellow" is a Fellowship of the International Court of Justice (ICJ) in The Hague awarded to only "a few of the most outstanding legal scholars worldwide" and is widely regarded as "the most competitive and coveted fellowship in international law."

The Court generally selects approximately 15 participants each year from a pool of what it describes as "the world's most promising law students." The Court seeks candidates of diverse nationalities and places particular emphasis on academic excellence and a demonstrated interest in public international law. Candidates must also have an excellent written and oral command of at least one of the Court's two official languages, English and French; a working knowledge of the other language is considered an asset. The Court does not accept applications from individuals; candidates must instead be nominated by their respective academic institutions, which select the candidate or candidates they wish to put forward for the Court's consideration.

Like other law clerks in various domestic and international courts and tribunals, ICJ Judicial Fellows serve on a full-time basis between ten and twelve months, and are each selected by an individual Judge of the Court. Their duties may include conducting legal research, drafting memorandums on questions of law or fact relating to cases pending before the Court, attending hearings and sittings, and performing other duties assigned by their respective judges.

The programme's participants have subsequently pursued careers in international law, academia, human rights, and international organizations. Notable alumni include international human rights lawyer Amal Clooney, United Nations Special Rapporteur on the independence of judges and lawyers Margaret Satterthwaite, and University of Cambridge Professor Sandesh Sivakumaran. In 2026, on the occasion of its 80th anniversary, the Court established the Alumni Association of the Judicial Fellows Programme.

The list of Judicial Fellows is organized by fellowship year. It includes the names of fellows, their nationality, and their nominating institution. The list provides a record of participants in the programme since its establishment and facilitate identification of former Judicial Fellows who have subsequently held prominent positions in international law, international organizations, academia, and related fields.

JF Programme	Name	Nationality	University
2000–2001	Robert Dufresne	Canada	New York University
2000–2001	Edda Kristjansdottir	Iceland	New York University
2000–2001	Wiebke Ruckert	Germany	New York University
2000–2001	Ludivine Tamiotti	France	New York University
2000–2001	Jeremy Zucker	USA	New York University
2001–2002	Nicolas Burniat	Belgium	New York University
2001–2002	Devika Hovell	Australia	New York University
2001–2002	Margaret Satterthwaite	USA	New York University
2001–2002	Pablo Javier Valverde	Costa Rica	New York University
2001–2002	Felix Weinacht	Germany	New York University
2002–2003	Simon De Smet	Belgium	Columbia University
2002–2003	Chiara Giorgetti	Italy	Yale University
2002–2003	Judith Levine	Australia	New York University
2002–2003	lana Petculescu	Romania	University of Strasbourg
2002–2003	Anne Rübesame	Germany	New York University
2003–2004	Daphné Richmond	France	Yale University
2003–2004	Aline Humbert	France	University of Strasbourg
2003–2004	Miša Zgonec-Rožej	Slovenia	Columbia University
2003–2004	Sandesh Sivakumaran	UK	New York University
2003–2004	José Ricardo Feris	Dominican Republic	New York University
2003–2004	Christopher J. Le Mon	USA	New York University
2003–2004	Marco Divac Oberg	Denmark	New York University
2004–2005	Cristina Hoss	Germany	Max Planck Institute for comparative public law and public international law
2004–2005	Sonia Boutillon	France	University of Michigan
2004–2005	Makane Moise Mbengue	Senegal	University of Geneva
2004–2005	Amal Alamuddin	UK/Lebanon	New York University
2004–2005	Philippa Webb	Australia	Yale University
2004–2005	Emma Lindsay	UK	New York University
2004–2005	Assel Sautova	Kazakhstan	University of Strasbourg
2004–2005	Natalya Scimeca	USA	Columbia University
2004–2005	Carsten Hoppe	Germany	University of Michigan
2004–2005	Sean Fraser	Canada	McGill University
2005–2006	David Fennelly	Ireland	New York University
2005–2006	Céline Folsche	France	University of Strasbourg
2005–2006	James Harris	USA	University of Virginia
2005–2006	Chie Kojima	Japan	Yale University
2005–2006	Olivia Le Fort	Switzerland	University of Geneva
2005–2006	Viren Mascarenhas	India/Portugal	Columbia University
2005–2006	Jason Morgan-Foster	USA	University of Michigan
2005–2006	Pierre-Olivier Savoie	Canada	McGill University
2005–2006	Jessica Simonoff	USA	Georgetown University
2006–2007	Régine Gachoud	Switzerland/Haiti	University of Geneva
2006–2007	Kimberley Trapp	Canada	McGill University
2006–2007	Viviane Meunier	France	Yale University
2006–2007	Peter Prows	USA	New York University
2006–2007	Marko Milanovic	Serbia	University of Michigan
2006–2007	Najwa Nabti	USA	University of Virginia
2006–2007	Cecily Rose	USA	Columbia University
2006–2007	Rebecca Jenkin	Australia/UK	Australian National University
2006–2007	David K. Nanopoulos	France/Greece	University of Strasbourg
2007–2008	Robyn Briese	Australia	University of Canberra
2007–2008	Chloé Fersing	France	University of Strasbourg
2007–2008	Jason Biros	USA	Columbia University
2007–2008	Stephan Schill	Germany	New York University
2007–2008	Nina Rabaeus	Switzerland	University of Geneva
2007–2008	Noam Wiener	Israel	University of Michigan
2007–2008	Jonas-Sébastien Beaudry	Canada	McGill University
2007–2008	Pamela Bookman	USA	University of Virginia
2007–2008	Cristina Villarino Villa	Spain	Yale University
2008–2009	Naomi Burke	Ireland	New York University
2008–2009	Flor de Maria Palaco Caballero	Peru	University of Strasbourg
2008–2009	Patrick Delaney	Australia/UK	Australian National University
2008–2009	Daniel Fromm	USA	George Washington University
2008–2009	Ted Kill	USA	University of Michigan
2008–2009	Bart Szewczyk	USA/Poland	Yale University
2008–2009	Kathleen Cronin-Furman	USA	Columbia University
2008–2009	Vincent-Joël Proulx	Canada	McGill University
2008–2009	Chad Farrell	USA	University of Virginia
2008–2009	Armel Lali	Benin	University of Geneva
2009–2010	Fernando Bordin	Brazil	New York University
2009–2010	Jennifer Cavanagh	Australia/UK	Australian National University
2009–2010	Stéphanie De Dycker	Belgium/Switzerland	University of Geneva
2009–2010	Veronika Fikfak	Slovenia	University of Oxford
2009–2010	Kyle Gervais	Canada	McGill University
2009–2010	Andreas Müller	Austria	Yale University
2009–2010	Klara Polackova	Czech Republic	University of Michigan
2009–2010	Caitlin Stapleton	USA	University of Virginia
2009–2010	Daniel Stewart	USA/UK	Columbia University
2009–2010	Shana Tabak	USA	Georgetown University
2009–2010	Francisco Pascual Vives	Spain	University of Alcalá
2009–2010	Luke Wilson	USA	George Washington University
2010–2011	Bryar Baban	Iraq	University of Strasbourg
2010–2011	Diane A. Desierto	Philippines	Yale University
2010–2011	Ernesto Féliz	Dominican Republic	University of Oxford
2010–2011	Filippo Fontanelli	Italy	New York University
2010–2011	Annalise Nelson	USA	University of Virginia
2010–2011	Emily S. Newton	USA	George Washington University
2010–2011	Alexia Solomou	Cyprus	Columbia University
2010–2011	Jasmine Wahhab	Canada	McGill University
2011–2012	Antonios Antonopoulos	Greece	University of Virginia
2011–2012	Uzma S. Burney	Pakistan	University of Michigan
2011–2012	Ellie Fogarty	Australia	Australian National University
2011–2012	Liang-Ying Tan	Singapore	National University of Singapore
2011–2012	Jay Butler	Bermuda/UK	Yale University
2011–2012	Maria Angelica Burgos	Colombia	New York University
2011–2012	Mélanie Beaumier	Canada	University of Ottawa
2011–2012	Absalam Mammadov	Azerbaijan	University of Strasbourg
2012–2013	Daniel Purisch	USA	Harvard University
2012–2013	Emma Dunlop	Australia	University of Oxford
2012–2013	Zhuo Jun Jennifer Lim	Singapore	University of Columbia
2012–2013	Anne Coulon	France	New York University
2012–2013	Sébastien Rosselet	Switzerland	University of Geneva
2012–2013	Ciara Murphy	Ireland	University of Michigan
2012–2013	Shashank Kumar	India	Yale University
2012–2013	Andrés Villegas	Colombia	Universidad de los Andes
2013–2014	Jessica Howley	UK/Australia	University of Oxford
2013–2014	Merryl Lawry-White	UK	New York University
2013–2014	Gregor Novak	Croatia	Yale University
2013–2014	Asier Garrido Muñoz	Spain	University of Alcalá
2013–2014	Amelia Tess Keen	New Zealand	Columbia University
2013–2014	Elinathan Ohiomoba	USA	Harvard University
2013–2014	Jean-Paul Saucier Calderón	Canada/Peru	McGill University
2013–2014	Sarah St. Vincent	USA/Italy	University of Michigan
2014–2015	Miriam Boxberg	Germany/Netherlands	University of Cambridge
2014–2015	Ananda Burra	India	University of Michigan
2014–2015	Emilie Conway	Canada	McGill University
2014–2015	Maxime Lenoir	France	University of Geneva
2014–2015	Liu Yang	China	Tsinghua University
2014–2015	Andrew Mamo	USA	Harvard University
2014–2015	Paul Mertenskotter	Germany	New York University
2014–2015	Tulio Di Giacomo Toledo	Brazil/Italy	George Washington University
2015–2016	Jessica Joly Hébert	Canada	McGill University
2015–2016	Haoua Savadogo	Burkina Faso	University of Geneva
2015–2016	Katelyn Horne	USA	Columbia University
2015–2016	Alexandre Genest	Canada	University of Ottawa
2015–2016	Karen Janssens	Belgium	University of Virginia
2015–2016	Laila Hamzi	Australia	London School of Economics
2015–2016	Sukriti	India	National University of Singapore
2015–2016	Jiang Bin	China	Peking University
2015–2016	Rosalind Elphick	South Africa/Ireland	University of Michigan
2015–2016	Miles Michael Jackson	South Africa/UK	University of Oxford
2015–2016	Manuel Casas Martínez	Venezuela	Yale University
2015–2016	Aishani Gupta	India	New York University
2015–2016	Caroline Kimeu	Kenya	Harvard University
2015–2016	Douglas Pivnichny	USA	Washington University in St. Louis
2015–2016	Younes Saci	Algeria	The Pennsylvania State University
2016–2017	Bruno Gélinas-Faucher	Canada	University of Ottawa
2016–2017	Mawuse Vormawor	Ghana	Harvard University
2016–2017	Peter Tzeng	USA	Yale University
2016–2017	Daniel Kaasik	Estonia	University of Oxford
2016–2017	Guillaume Guez	France	University of Geneva
2016–2017	Michele Krech	Canada	New York University
2016–2017	Daniel Regan	Ireland	London School of Economics
2016–2017	Shang Weiwei	China	Peking University
2016–2017	Muhammad Syafruddin	Indonesia	University of Virginia
2016–2017	Chaka Laguerre	Jamaica/USA/UK	University of Michigan
2016–2017	Portia Karegeya	Uganda	McGill University
2016–2017	Claire O’Connell	USA	Columbia University
2016–2017	Michelle Owusu	Ghana/Canada	York University
2016–2017	Harry Aitken	Australia	Australian National University
2016–2017	Teresa Mayr	Austria	Leiden University
2017–2018	Eliane Dupere-Tremblay	Canada	University of Ottawa
2017–2018	Rina Kuusipalo	Finland	Stanford University
2017–2018	Samuel Chang	USA	Harvard University
2017–2018	Sotirios-Ioannis Lekkas	Greece	University of Oxford
2017–2018	Justin Fisch, replaced by Rachel Zuroff as of 27/11/2017	Canada	McGill University
2017–2018	Rachel Zuroff	USA/Canada	McGill University
2017–2018	Branwen Francis	USA/UK	University of British Columbia
2017–2018	Ryce Lee	Singapore	National University of Singapore
2017–2018	Gulardi Nurbintoro	Indonesia	University of Virginia
2017–2018	Julia Sherman	Canada/UK	Columbia University
2017–2018	Callum Musto	UK/Australia	London School of Economics
2017–2018	Nawi Ukabiala	Nigeria/USA	New York University
2017–2018	Yusra Suedi	Tanzania/Switzerland	University of Geneva
2017–2018	Kritika Sharma	India	Leiden University
2017–2018	Gunjan Chawla	India	Georgetown University
2017–2018	Marcos Garcia Dominguez	Argentina	University of Chicago
2017–2018	Erin Collins	USA	University of Michigan
2018–2019	Sara Mansour Fallah	Austria	G. Washington University
2018–2019	Timothy McKenzie	USA	New York University
2018–2019	Jonathan Brosseau-Rioux	Canada	McGill University
2018–2019	Daphné Amouna	France	Georgetown University
2018–2019	Momchil Milanov	Bulgaria	University of Geneva
2018–2019	Anna Sruthi John	Australia/India	Leiden University
2018–2019	Martin Willner	USA	Columbia University
2018–2019	Amir Farhadi	USA/Ireland/Iran	Harvard University
2018–2019	Kirsten Storey	Australia/UK	Australian National University
2018–2019	Gayathiri Vellore Ekambaram	India	Chanakya National Law University
2018–2019	Camila Mariño	Colombia	Stanford University
2018–2019	Yulia Ioffe	Ukraine	Oxford University
2018–2019	Beatrice Walton	USA	Yale University
2018–2019	Florian Knerr	Germany	University of Virginia
2018–2019	Marcos Kotlik	Argentina	University of Michigan
2019–2020	Sally O'Donnell	Australia	Australian National University
2019–2020	Catalina Fernández Carter	Chile	University of Cambridge
2019–2020	Anika Havaldar	USA/India	Columbia University
2019–2020	Apollin Koagne Zouapet	Cameroon	University of Geneva
2019–2020	Julie Baleynaud	France/Germany	Georgetown University
2019–2020	Nayomi Goonesekere	Sri Lanka	George Washington University
2019–2020	Ashrutha Rai	India	Harvard University
2019–2020	Nicolas Bianchi	Argentina	Leiden University
2019–2020	Iñaki Navarrete-Arechavaleta	Canada/Chile	McGill University
2019–2020	Nadia Alhadi	USA	University of Michigan
2019–2020	Felix Boos	Germany	New York University
2019–2020	Zachary Vermeer	Australia	University of Oxford
2019–2020	Yu Hsiang Huang	China	Peking University
2019–2020	McCoy Pitt	USA	University of Virginia
2019–2020	Shikha Garg	US/Australia	Yale University
2020–2021	Idriss Fofana	Ivory Coast/USA	Yale University
2020–2021	Li Zhenni	China	Cornell University
2020–2021	Thomas Sparks	UK	Max Planck Institute
2020–2021	Lucas Mathieu	France	McGill University
2020–2021	Perpétua Chéry	Haïti/USA	Georgetown University
2020–2021	Lisandra Novo	USA	Harvard University
2020–2021	Tay Wei Xuan	Singapore	National University of Singapore
2020–2021	Hannes Jöbstl	Austria	University of Oxford
2020–2021	Afia Kwakwa	Ghana/Switzerland/USA	Columbia University
2020–2021	Mohit Khubchandani	India	Stanford University
2020–2021	Ayse Guzel Ozturk	Turkey	George Washington University
2020–2021	Céline Braumann	Austria	New York University
2020–2021	Agathe Niveleau	France	University of Angers
2020–2021	Nicola Nesi	Italy/France	University of Leiden
2020–2021	Dean Rosenberg	Australia/Poland	University of Cambridge
2020–2021	Aditya Laddha	India	University of Geneva
2021–2022	Terrence Neal	USA	Harvard University
2021–2022	Olivia Le Menestrel	France	Georgetown University
2021–2022	Camille Boileau	Australia/France	University of Cambridge
2021–2022	Eglantine Jamet	France	University of Leiden
2021–2022	Camille Letoublon	France	University of Geneva
2021–2022	Ana Luquerna	Colombia/France	University of Chicago
2021–2022	Islam Attia Mohamed	Egypt	Graduate Institute of International and Development Studies
2021–2022	Mao Xiao	China	Shanghai Jiao Tong University
2021–2022	Kamille Adair Morgan	Jamaica	University of Oxford
2021–2022	Tanishtha Vaid	India	New York University
2021–2022	Sara Kaufhardt	USA	Columbia University
2021–2022	Joelle Hageboutros	Lebanon/USA	University of Pennsylvania
2021–2022	Christopher Bello	Mexico/Belgium/Canada/USA	Stanford University
2021–2022	Wang Yifei	China	University of Xiamen
2021–2022	Emma Macfarlane	Canada	University of Michigan
2022–2023	Haris Huremagić	Austria	University of Michigan
2022–2023	Danielle M. Flanagan	USA	Georgetown University
2022–2023	Victoria Gregory	UK	London School of Economics
2022–2023	Eva Baudichau	Belgium	University of Leiden
2022–2023	Claire Duval	France	Stanford University
2022–2023	Cassandra Allen	USA	Columbia University
2022–2023	Mutondi Mulaudzi	South Africa	University of South Africa
2022–2023	Yang Wenlan	China	Sun Yat-sen University
2022–2023	Yang Eun Sung	Korea	Harvard University
2022–2023	Bektas Tutku	Türkiye	New York University
2022–2023	Danilo Barbosa Garrido Alves	Brazil	University of Brasilia
2022–2023	Benja M. Kotobongo Likondo	Congo	Marien Ngouabi University
2022–2023	Christie Wilson	Australia/UK	University of Sydney
2022–2023	Keilin E. Anderson	Australia	Australian National University
2022–2023	Eirini-Erasmia Fasia	Greece	University of Oxford
2022–2023	Saba Mollaian	Australia/Luxembourg/Switzerland	University of Geneva
2023–2024	Daniel Fahrenthold	USA	Columbia University
2023–2024	Charlotte Verdun	France	New York University
2023–2024	Emma Svoboda	USA	Harvard University
2023–2024	Camille Lefebvre	Canada	Université Laval
2023–2024	Hiba Brahmi	Tunisia	Faculté de Droit et des Sciences Politiques de Tunis El Manar
2023–2024	Gabriella Yehualashet Gebremedhin	Ethiopia	George Washington University
2023–2024	Suhong Yang	China	Georgetown University
2023–2024	Lara Ibrahim	UK	University of Oxford
2023–2024	Anusha Madhusudhan	India	National University of Advanced Legal Studies
2023–2024	Vahid Rezadoost	Iran	Shahid Beheshti University
2023–2024	Ines Mesek	Switzerland/Croatia	Université de Genève
2023–2024	Zhifeng Jiang	Singapore	National University of Singapore
2023–2024	Dominic Joseph Bielby	UK	University of Cambridge
2023–2024	Azul Martina Navarro	Argentina	University of Leiden
2023–2024	Eva Keita	France	Stanford University
2024–2025	Yen Ba Vu	Viet Nam	Harvard University
2024–2025	Sandra Bucha	Kenya	Strathmore University
2024–2025	Emma Iannini	USA/Italy	New York University
2024–2025	Félix Aguettant	France	University of California, Berkeley
2024–2025	Dana Hafiz Farraj	Palestine	Birzeit University
2024–2025	Doudou Huang	China	Maastricht University
2024–2025	Mine Orer	Türkiye/USA	Georgetown University
2024–2025	Allyson Ping	USA	Columbia University
2024–2025	Ashley Stanley-Ryan	New Zealand/Ireland	IHEID Geneva
2024–2025	Bianca Ortiz	Philippines	University of the Philippines
2024–2025	Benjamin Kagina Senga	Congo	Université Laval
2024–2025	Raphael Pierfederici	France/Italy	University of Leiden
2024–2025	Alaa Hachem	Canada/Lebanon	Yale University
2024–2025	Aybüke Özdemir	Türkiye	Galatasaray University
2024–2025	Luwam M. Weldemichael	Eritrea	College of Business and Social Sciences, Eritrea
2025–2026	Edward Watson	Australia/Japan/UK	The University of Queensland
2025–2026	Manaka Murakado	Japan	Kobe University
2025–2026	Veronica Soon	Malaysia	University of Oxford
2025–2026	Marta Canneri	Italy/Canada	Harvard University
2025–2026	Myriam Mouhoub	Morocco	Leiden University
2025–2026	Syed Qasim Abbas	Pakistan	Lahore University of Management Sciences
2025–2026	Liyu Feng	China	China University of Political Science and Law
2025–2026	Abhijeet Shrivastava	India	O. P. Jindal Global University
2025–2026	Lara Manbeck	USA	Columbia University
2025–2026	Rebecca McMenamin	New Zealand	University of Cambridge
2025–2026	Adil Auraghi	Belgium/Morocco	Stanford University
2025–2026	Nickolas Eburne	Canada	University of Ottawa
2025–2026	Marina Wilbraham	USA/Brazil/UK/Italy	Yale University
2025–2026	Lillian Robb	Australia	Graduate Institute of International and Development Studies
2025–2026	Thomas White	South Africa	University of Pretoria
2025–2026	Karin Arana Chacon	Guatemala	Universidad Rafael Landívar
