= Penelope Andrews =

South African and American legal scholar

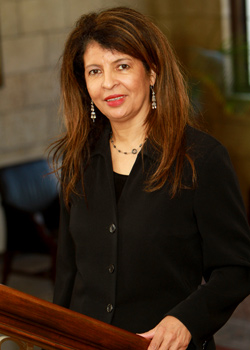
Penelope (Penny) Andrews, Former President of Albany Law School

Penelope (Penny) Andrews is a South African and American legal scholar.

== Early life and education ==
Andrews began her teaching career at Australia’s La Trobe University, where she taught for eight years, before moving to the City University of New York School of Law, where she taught public international law, gender and law, race and law, comparative law, and torts for 15 years. She has held visiting appointments at law schools across the U.S. and internationally and senior leadership posts, including serving as the first Black dean at the University of Cape Town Faculty of Law (2016–2018) and the first female dean of Albany Law School (2012–2015).

Andrews is active in international collaborative research and mentoring networks and committed to ensuring the relevance of law and society scholarship to global academic communities. She is an editor of the International Journal of Law in Context, the Human Rights and the Global Economy E-Journal, and the African Law E-Journal.

She has authored several books and articles focusing on comparative constitutional law, gender and racial equality, human rights, the judiciary, and legal education. She is working on a manuscript, Law, Politics and the #MeToo Movement (forthcoming 2023).

Andrews’ focus on the judiciary in South Africa seeks to bridge the divide between theory and practice. Her writing explores the transformation of the judiciary, particularly the appointment of female judges. She was a trainer with Judicial Institute for Africa, specializing in judicial opinion writing and communications skills. She also served as an Acting Judge of the North Gauteng High Court in Pretoria for the 2018 third term and as an arbitrator in racial discrimination hearings in South Africa.

She has served on law school committees and the boards of public interest and human rights organizations, including the Africa Section of Human Rights Watch and the National Center for Law and Economic Justice. She recently served a two-year term as the president of the Law and Society Association. Currently, she serves as chair of the board of the Institute for African Women in Law and is a member of the National University of Ireland Galway’s External Advisory Group on Gender Equality and the advisory committee of the South African Research Chair in Teaching and Learning at the University of Pretoria. Andrews has received many awards, including an honorary degree from Franklin University in Switzerland in recognition of her work and commitment to social justice and human rights. She hosted the South Africa Reading Group, which she co-founded with the late Professor Stephen Ellmann in 1994.

On International Women's Day in 2024 she joined a panel which included Nayera Kohistani of Afghanistan, the Maltese politician Vanessa Frazier, Dorothy Estrada-Tanck and Nobel Laureate Malala Yousafzai moderated by CNN's Jomana Karadsheh. The panel highlighted what Nayera Kohistani called the criminalisation of gender in Afghanistan. She asked the international community to consider "where are we going to draw the red line?"

== Awards and honors ==
She received the National Bar Association's International Award for her global human rights advocacy, and in 2015 was included in the USA's Lawyers of Colour's fourth annual power list issue.

The South African law school at the University of KwaZulu-Natal annually presents an award in her name: The Penelope E. Andrews Human Rights Award. She was a finalist in 2005 for a vacancy on the Constitutional Court of South Africa, the highest court on the country's constitutional matters. On July 2, 2015, it was announced that she had been appointed Dean of the faculty of law at the University of Cape Town.

== Publications ==
=== Books ===
- From Cape Town to Kabul: Reconsidering Women's Human Rights (2012)
- Law and Rights: Global Perspectives on Constitutionalism and Governance (Co-edited with Susan Bazilli, 2008)
- The Post-Apartheid Constitutions: Perspectives on South Africa's Basic Law (Co-edited with Stephen Ellmann, 2001)
- Gender, Race and Comparative Advantage: A Cross-national Assessment of Programs of Compensatory Discrimination (Editor, 1999)

=== Law Review articles ===
- Race, Inclusiveness and Transformation of Legal Education in South Africa, in CONSTITUTIONAL TRIUMPHS, CONSTITUTIONAL DISAPPOINTMENTS (Rosalind Dixon and Theunis Roux eds. 2017) 223
- Justice, Reconciliation and the Masculinist Way: What Role for Women in Truth Commissions? 60 NEW YORK LAW SCHOOL LAW REVIEW (2015-2016) 69
- A Champion for African Freedom: Paul Robeson and the Struggle Against Apartheid 77 ALBANY LAW REVIEW (2014) 101
- A Tribute to the Honorable Carmen Beauchamp Ciparick 76 ALBANY LAW REVIEW (2012-2013) 833
- Law and Society in ENCYCLOPEDIA OF SOUTH AFRICA (Krista Johnson and Sean Jacobs eds. 2011) 173
- Without Fear, Favor or Prejudice: Judicial Transformation and the Independence of the Judiciary in South Africa in LAW AND SOCIAL MOVEMENTS (Scott Cummings ed. 2010) 197
- The Judiciary in South Africa: Independence or Illusion? in JUDICIAL INDEPENDENCE IN CONTEXT (Adam Dodek & Lorne Sossin eds. 2010) 466
- "Who's Afraid of Polygamy? Exploring the Boundaries of Family, Equality and Custom in South Africa," University of Utah Law Review (2009)
- "'Democracy Stops at My Front Door': Obstacles in Gender Equality in South Africa," Loyola Chicago Journal of International Law (2007)
- "Big Love? The Recognition of Customary Marriages in South Africa," Washington and Lee Law Review (2007)
- "Learning to Love After Learning to Harm: Post-Conflict Reconstruction, Gender Equality and Cultural Values," Michigan State Journal of International Law (2006)
- "Violence Against Aboriginal Women in Australia: Possibilities for Redress within The International Human Rights Framework," Albany Law Review (1997)
