= Virginia Gamba (UN official) =

Argentine diplomat (born 1954)

- Gamba in 2025

Special Representative for Children and Armed Conflict
- In office 12 April 2017 – July 2025
- Secretary-General: António Guterres
- Preceded by: Leila Zerrougui
- Succeeded by: Vanessa Frazier

Personal details
- Born: 1954 (age 71–72) San Martín, Buenos Aires, Argentina

Virginia Gamba de Potgieter (born 1954) is an Argentinian diplomat who served as United Nations Secretary-General António Guterres's Special Representative for Children and Armed Conflict from 2017 to 2025.

== Education ==
Born in San Martín, Buenos Aires, Argentina, Gamba was educated in Bolivia, Peru, Switzerland, Spain, and the United Kingdom. She holds a Master of Science degree in strategic studies from the University College of Wales and a Bachelor of Arts in Spanish and American studies from the University of Newcastle upon Tyne.

== Career ==
Early in her career, Gamba served as director for the Centre for Military Transformation of the Argentine Republic (1984–1986) as well as lecturer at the University of Maryland in 1986 and a senior lecturer in Latin American security studies in the Department of War Studies at King's College London during 1987–1990.

In the 1990s, she was the director of the Disarmament and Conflict Resolution Project of the United Nations Institute for Disarmament Research (UNIDIR) in Geneva. In 1998, she was also head of the Small Arms Programme at the Institute for Security Studies in South Africa.

From 2001 to 2007, Gamba was director of South–South Interactions at SaferAfrica. From 2007 to 2009, Gamba worked with the European Union as an expert consultant and helped develop the African Common Approach to Combat Illicit Small Arms Trafficking.

From 2009 to 2012, Gamba served as deputy director of Safety and Security at the Institute for Public Safety in Argentina's Ministry of Justice and Human Rights.

From 2012 to 2015, Gamba held the position of director and deputy to the High Representative for Disarmament Affairs in the United Nations Office for Disarmament Affairs (UNODA). She later served as head of the Organisation for the Prohibition of Chemical Weapons – United Nations Joint Investigative Mechanism established by Security Council Resolution 2235 on the use of chemical weapons in Syria.

From 2017 to 2025, Gamba served as the Special Representative of the Secretary-General for Children and Armed Conflict. Concurrently, from December 2024 to June 2025, she held the position of Special Adviser to the Secretary-General on Prevention of Genocide and Hate Speech on an acting basis.

In May 2023, it became known that Gamba met with Mariya Lvova-Belova, who is wanted by the Hague Tribunal for mass abductions of children during the Russian invasion of Ukraine. This meeting provoked harsh reactions from various human rights groups and the U.S. government.

On 11 March 2026, Gamba was nominated by the Maldives to become the next Secretary-General of the United Nations upon the end of António Guterres's term in 2026, but her candidacy was withdrawn two weeks later.

== Other activities ==
- Global Partnership to End Violence Against Children, Member of the Board

== Recognition ==
Gamba shared the Nobel Peace Prize as formal member of the executive board of the Pugwash Conferences on Science and World Affairs (1995) with Joseph Rotblat. She served on the Pugwash board from 1985 to 1996.
