= Giannina Facio =

Costa Rican actress

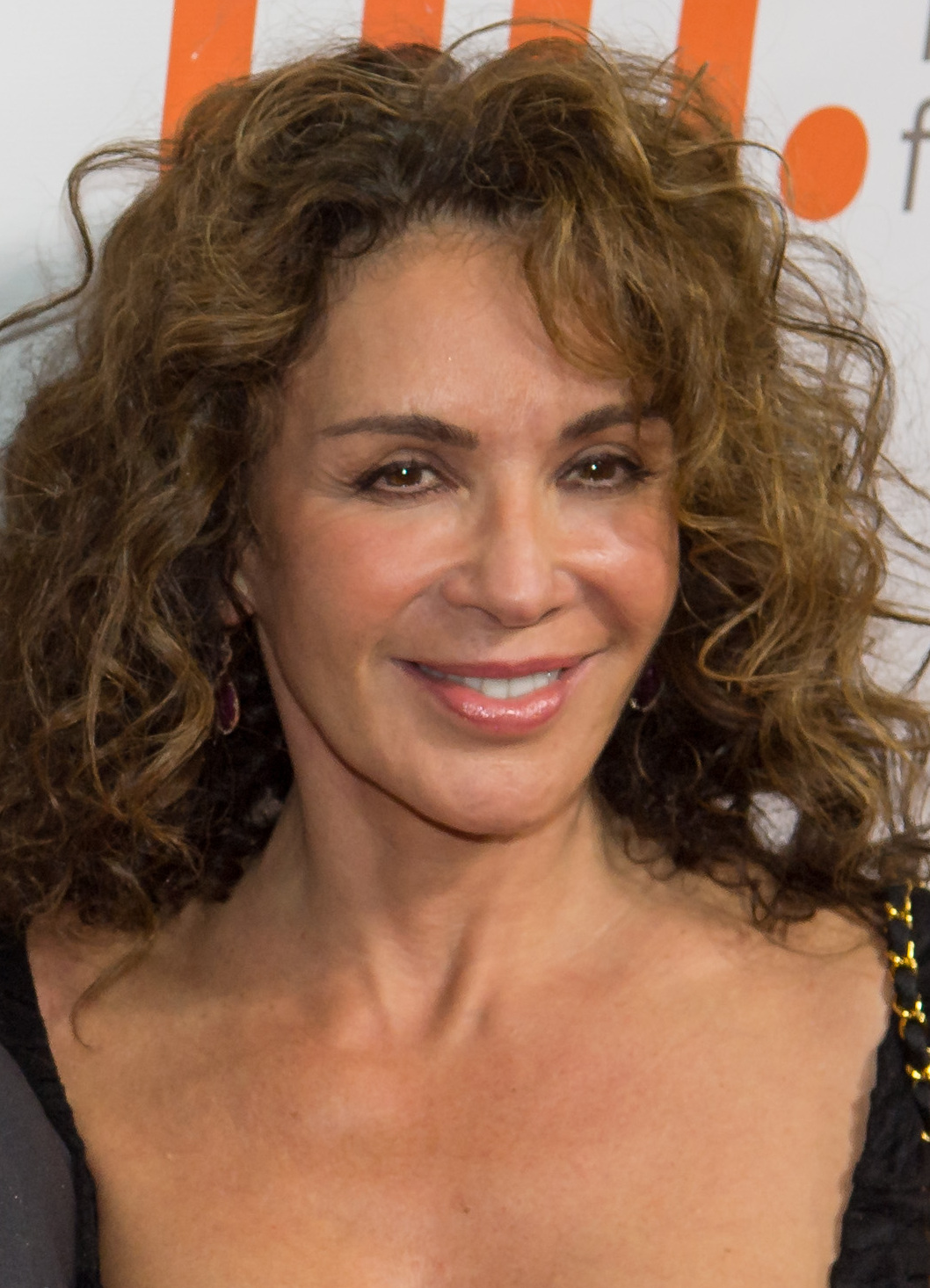
- Facio at the premiere of The Martian in 2015
- Born: Giannina Facio Franco; September 10, 1955 (age 70); San José, Costa Rica
- Occupations: Actress, producer
- Years active: 1984–present
- Spouse: Sir Ridley Scott (m. 2015)
- Father: Gonzalo Facio Segreda
- Relatives: Alda Facio Montejo (half-sister)

Giannina Facio, Lady Scott (born Giannina Facio Franco; September 10, 1955), is a Costa Rican actress who has appeared in several films, especially those of her husband, British film director and producer Sir Ridley Scott. She first worked with Scott on White Squall and has been his partner since Hannibal. Gladiator was the first of two films in which she plays the wife of Russell Crowe's character, the other being Body of Lies. Since White Squall, Facio has made appearances in all of Scott's films except for American Gangster, The Martian, Alien: Covenant, The Last Duel, House of Gucci and Napoleon.

== Biography ==
She was born as Giannina Facio Franco on September 10, 1955, in San José, Costa Rica to lawyer, politician and diplomat Gonzalo Facio Segreda (1918–2018) and his second wife, Ana Franco Calzia (1930–2003). She has two sisters, Ana Catalina and Carla. She also has three older half-siblings from her father's first marriage: Sandra, Alda and Rómulo (whose mother is María Lilia Montejo Ortuño).

== Personal life ==
Facio married her producing partner Sir Ridley Scott in June 2015; they had been dating since 2000.

== Filmography ==
=== As actress ===
Year	Title	Role	Notes
1984	Poppers	Lola	
1985	Miami Vice	Model	Episode: "The Prodigal Son"
1990	Nel giardino delle rose		
1990	Delta Force Commando II: Priority Red One	Juna	
1990	Vacanze di Natale '90	Rita	
1991	L'odissea	Elena di Troia	TV movie
1992	Nessuno mi crede	Mai	
1992	Extralarge: Cannonball	Secretary	TV movie
1993	Torta di mele		
1996	Il cielo è sempre più blu		
1996	White Squall	Girlschool Teacher	
1997	No se puede tener todo	Marga	
1997	G.I. Jane	Girl at the Beach Party	
1998	Spanish Fly	Antonio's Date #2	
1999	The Hunger	Vivica Linders	Episode: "Night Bloomer"
2000	Gladiator	Maximus' Wife	
2001	Hannibal	Verger's Fingerprint Technician	
2001	Black Hawk Down	Stephanie Shughart (uncredited)	
2003	Matchstick Men	Bank Teller	
2005	Kingdom of Heaven	Saladin's Sister	
2006	A Good Year	Maitre D'	
2008	Body of Lies	Hoffman's Wife	
2010	Robin Hood	Lady-in-Waiting	
2013	The Counselor	Woman with Mobile Phone	
2014	Exodus: Gods and Kings	Jethro's Sister	
2017	All the Money in the World	Art Dealer's Assistant	

=== As producer ===
- Matchstick Men (2003) – co-producer
- Tristan & Isolde (2006)
- Concussion (2015)
- Mark Felt: The Man Who Brought Down the White House (2017)
- House of Gucci (2021)
