= Jomana Karadsheh =

Jordanian born broadcast journalist

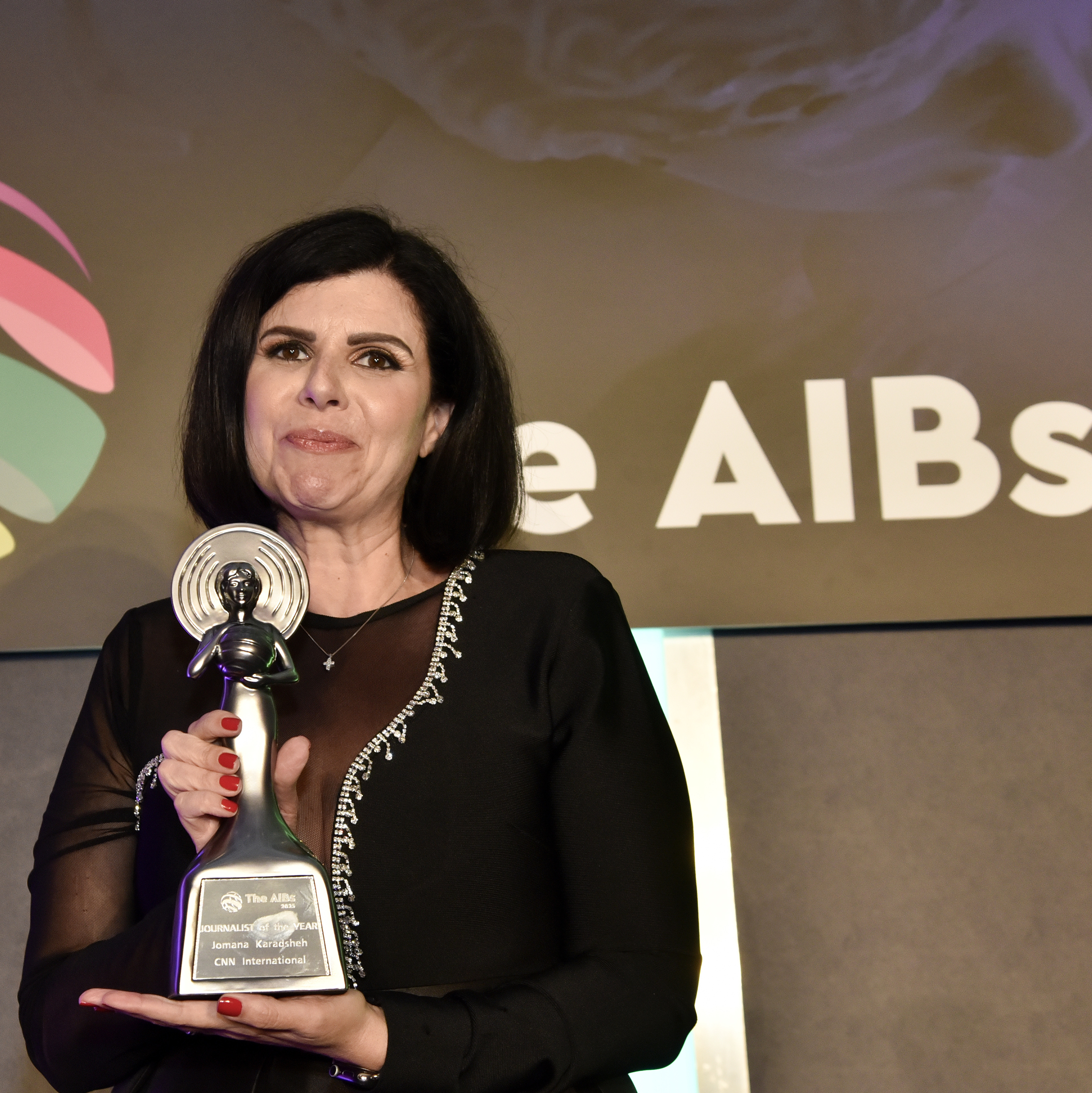
- AIB award of Journalist of the Year in 2025
- Born: Jordan
- Other names: Jomana Karadsheh Scott
- Education: Lebanese American University
- Occupation: journalist
- Employer: CNN

Jomana Karadsheh is a Jordanian born reporter for CNN. She won a Gracie award in 2024 and she was Journalist of the year according to Association for International Broadcasting in 2025.

== Life ==
Karadsheh was brought up in Jordan's capital city of Amman. She studied journalism in Buirut at the Lebanese American University.

She was later based in London and Karadsheh was an international correspondent for the American news channel CNN.

In 2023 the Nobel committee recognised Narges Mohammadi for a Peace Prize. Karadsheh surprised the media because she had already profiled her. She had interviewed Narges Mohammadi even though she was in Evin Prison. During that year she reported on the Israel-Hamas War and the earthquake in Turkey and Syria in February.

In September 2023 she was in Libya where she was one of the few foreign journalists reporting on the flooding in Derna after two dams collapsed.

On International Women's Day in 2024 Karadsheh moderated a panel which included Nayera Kohistani of Afghanistan, the Mexican academic Dorothy Estrada-Tanck, the Maltese politician Vanessa Frazier, Penelope Andrews and Nobel Laureate Malala Yousafzai. The panel highlighted what Nayera Kohistani called the criminalisation of gender in Afghanistan. She asked the international community to consider "where are we going to draw the red line?"

In May 2024 she was given a Gracie Award for her inspirational reporting by the Alliance for Women in Media.

In 2025 the AIB chose her as their Journalist of the Year at a ceremony hosted by Ayanda Charlie in London.
