= Mark Walton Fowler =

American physician known for his participation in executions

Mark Walton Fowler is an American physician known for his attempted participation in executions in the state of Tennessee.

He was a participant in the attempted execution of Tony Carruthers in 2026, during which he attempted to install a central line. Later that year, he oversaw the attempted execution of Christa Pike. Medical participants in executions are rarely named; Walton was identified accidentally by a warden at the Tennessee Department of Correction following the execution of Byron Black in 2025.

Fowler is a graduate of the University of Tennessee College of Medicine, and has specialised in family medicine.
