= Gonzalo Facio Segreda =

Costa Rican lawyer, politician and diplomat (1918–2018)

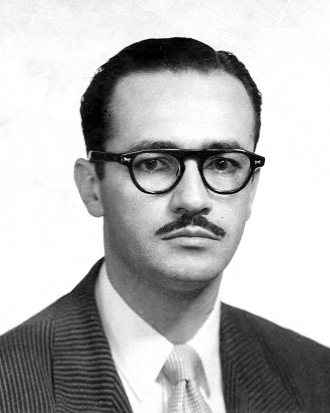
- Facio in 1953

Minister of Foreign Affairs
- In office 1977–1978
- President: Daniel Oduber Quirós
- Preceded by: Wilburg Jiménez Castro (acting)
- Succeeded by: Rafael Ángel Calderón Fournier
- In office 1970–1976
- President: José Figueres Ferrer; Daniel Oduber Quirós
- Preceded by: Fernando Lara Bustamante
- Succeeded by: Wilburg Jiménez Castro (acting)

3rd President of the Legislative Assembly of Costa Rica
- In office 1 November 1953 – 30 October 1956
- Preceded by: Abelardo Bonilla Baldares
- Succeeded by: Otto Cortés Fernández

Personal details
- Born: Gonzalo Justo Facio Segreda; 28 March 1918 San José, Costa Rica
- Died: 24 January 2018 (aged 99) Escazu, Costa Rica
- Spouses: María Lilia Montejo Ortuño; Ana Franco Calzia; Julia Nubia Salmerón Mejía (m. 2008; div. 2010)
- Children: 6, including Alda and Giannina
- Relatives: Zelmira Segreda (aunt)
- Profession: Lawyer; politician; diplomat

Gonzalo Justo Facio Segreda (28 March 1918 – 24 January 2018) was a Costa Rican lawyer, politician, and diplomat.

Facio was born in San José on 28 March 1918 to Gonzalo Facio Ulloa and María Teresa Segreda Solera.

He studied law at the University of Costa Rica and New York University. He served on the Founding Junta of the Second Republic and was a founding member of the National Liberation Party. Between 1953 and 1956, he was President of the Legislative Assembly of Costa Rica.

Facio first became Costa Rican ambassador to the United States in 1956, and held the post for two years. He returned to the position in 1962, serving through 1966. He was named foreign minister in 1970, and was succeeded by Rafael Ángel Calderón Fournier in 1978. From 1990 to 1994, he was again ambassador to the United States. In 1998, he was appointed ambassador to Mexico, and stepped down in 2001.

He was married three times. He had three children (Sandra, Alda and Rómulo) from his first wife, María Lilia Montejo Ortuño. From his second wife, Ana Franco Calzia, he had three more children (Ana Catalina, Giannina and Carla). From his third wife Julia Nubia Salmerón Mejía he had no offspring.

Facio died at the age of 99 on 24 January 2018 in Escazu.
