= Zelmira Segreda Solera de Cappella =

Costa Rican soprano

- Born: Zelmira Segreda Solera; 29 May 1878; Heredia, Costa Rica
- Died: 19 July 1923 (aged 45); San José, Costa Rica
- Occupations: Singer, teacher
- Spouse: Enrique Cappella Palmieri
- Children: 2
- Relatives: Gonzalo Facio Segreda (nephew)

Zelmira Segreda Solera de Cappella (1878–1923) was a Costa Rican soprano. She studied singing in Italy and was a successful performer on her return to Costa Rica. She is "considered one of the most important dramatic sopranos that Costa Rica has ever had."

== Biography ==
Zelmira Segreda Solera was born in Heredia, Costa Rica on 29 May 1878. Her parents were Rosendo Segreda Zamora and Susana Filomena de los Dolores Solera Rodríguez.

Segreda went to school at Colegio Nuestra Señora de Sión in Costa Rica. Around 1905 she went to Italy on a scholarship to study singing. Segreda spent six months in Milan (Note: It has been reported that Segreda first studied at a conservatory in Naples, but Segreda herself made no mention of this.) before moving to Rome to study at the Conservatorio Santa Cecilia, where she won a prize and graduated some time between 1906 and 1909. On 6 February 1909 Segreda married Italian architect Enrique Cappella Palmieri, Marquis of Rocca San Felice and Baron of Caprofico, with whom she later had two children, Yolanda and Antonio.

In 1910 Segreda returned to Costa Rica and was living in Cartago when the city was destroyed by the 1910 Costa Rica earthquakes. Following the earthquakes Segreda moved to San José, where she had a successful singing career, and also taught music. Segreda performed several times at the National Theatre of Costa Rica, singing with others including Melico Salazar. In 1916 she was invited by Amelita Galli-Curci to accompany her on a singing tour of South America, but refused for family reasons.

Segreda died on 19 July 1923 of pernicious anemia. Her funeral was attended by Costa Rican president Julio Acosta García and former presidents Cleto González Víquez and Carlos Durán Cartín.
