= Gracie Awards =

Awards celebrating women's contributions to media

The Gracie Awards are awards presented by the Alliance for Women in Media Foundation (AWM) in the United States, to celebrate and honor programming created for women, by women, and about women, as well as individuals who have made exemplary contributions in electronic media and affiliates. Presented annually, the Gracie Awards recognize national, local, and student works.

== History ==
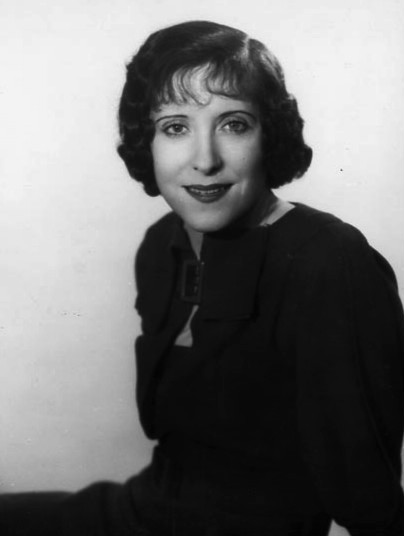
The award's namesake is radio and television star Gracie Allen.

The Gracie Awards ceremony is presented by the Alliance for Women in Media Foundation (AWM), since 1975. The awards are named after radio and television star Gracie Allen. Allen was a successful comedian, entertainer, entrepreneur and activist. As half of the Burns and Allen act, one of the most prominent comedy teams in American history, with husband George Burns, Allen has been a role model for women in media and entertainment.

The awards are intended to be for women in the media and they are awarded by women.

The Gracie Awards are held on two days, known as the gala and the luncheon. The Gracie Awards Gala is a black tie evening event that awards individuals in the national and mainstream arena. The Gracie Awards Gala has been regularly held at the Beverly Hilton Hotel in Los Angeles, California. The Gracie Awards Luncheon, a more casual event, honors local, public, online, and student works and has been held in New York.

== Awards include ==
The 2019 ceremony took place on May 21, with the "local and student award winners," honored on June 26. The 2020 ceremony was held virtually on September 10, 2020, and honorees included Katy Perry for the Gracies Impact Award, Gayle King, Michelle Williams, Niecy Nash, Trisha Yearwood, Ginger Zee, Alex Duda and Izzie Pick Ibarra.

In 2024 CNN journalist Jomana Karadsheh was given a Gracie Award for her inspirational reporting.

== See also ==
- List of media awards honoring women
- McCall's Golden Mike Award
- Broadway theatre
- George Burns
