= Alda Facio =

Costa Rican feminist jurist, writer and teacher

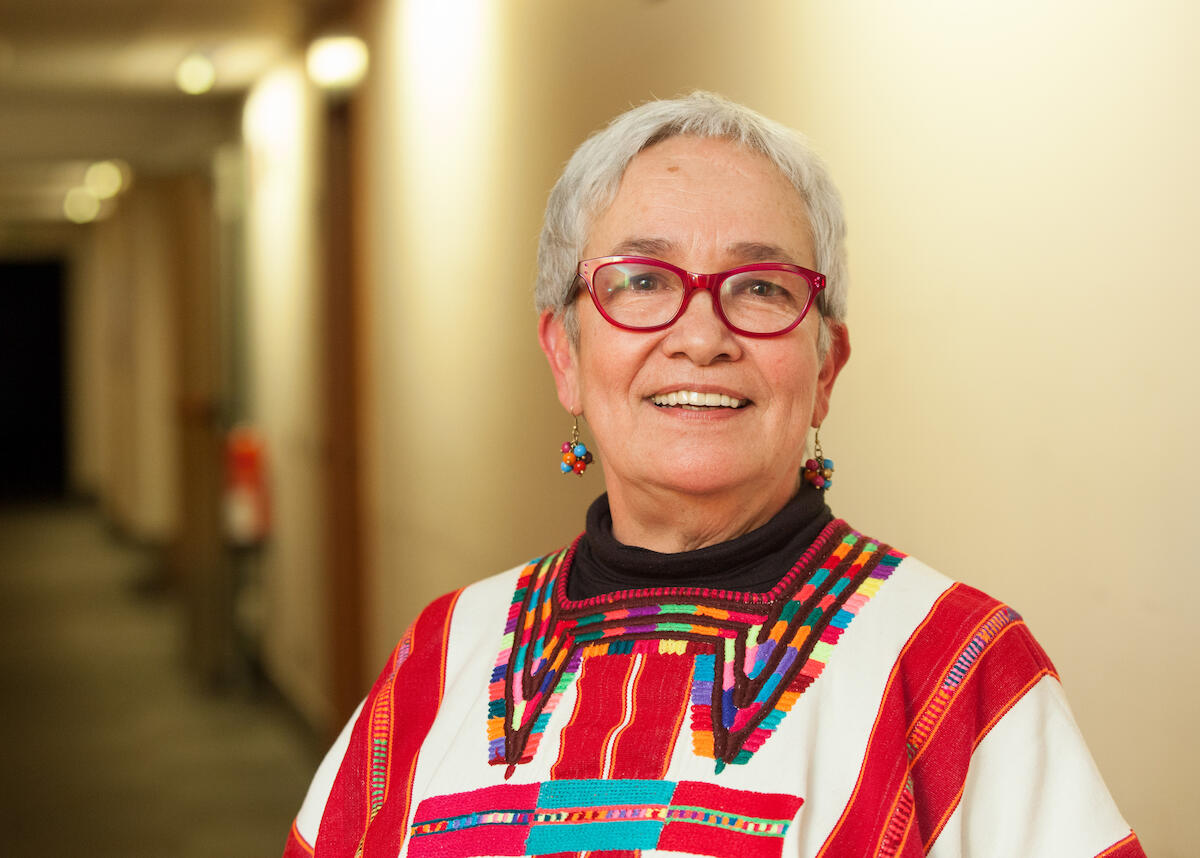
- Facio in 2015
- Born: Alda Facio Montejo; 26 January 1948 (age 78); New York City, United States
- Education: New York University; University of Costa Rica
- Occupations: Lawyer and writer
- Predecessor: Patricia Olamendi Torres
- Successor: Dorothy Estrada-Tanck as UN expert
- Parent(s): Gonzalo Facio Segreda; María Lilia Montejo Ortuño
- Relatives: Giannina Facio Franco (half-sister)

Alda Facio Montejo (born 26 January 1948) is a Costa Rican feminist, jurist, writer, teacher and international expert in gender and human rights in Latin America. She is one of the founding members of the Women's Caucus for Gender Justice at the International Criminal Court. Since 1991, she has been the Director of Women, Justice and Gender, a program within the United Nations Latin American Institute for the Prevention of Crime and the Treatment of Offenders (ILANUD) and vice president of the Justice and Gender Foundation. She was also one of the founding members of Ventana in the 1970s, one of the first feminist organizations in her native Costa Rica. In 2014, she was chosen to be one of the five United Nations special rapporteurs for the Working Group against Discrimination against Women and Girls. Her term came to and end in 2020 and she was succeeded by Dorothy Estrada-Tanck.

== Biography ==
Alda Facio was born in New York City in the United States of America on 26 January 1948 to lawyer, politician and diplomat Gonzalo Facio Segreda (1918–2018) and his first wife María Lilia Montejo Ortuño. She has a sister, Sandra and a brother, Rómulo. She also has three younger half-sisters through her father's second marriage: Giannina, Ana Catalina and Carla (their mother is Ana Franco Calzia). During the 1960s, when she was 17 or 18, Facio discovered feminism and would later tell the Carnegie Council that her reason for becoming a feminist was that "feminists and feminism gives you strength knowing that you're part of a global movement is something that gives you a lot of energy to move forward."

== Gender and human rights ==
Facio's professional career began in the 1980s. In 1981, she organized the First Seminar on Violence Against Women, held at the Supreme Court of Costa Rica. In 1984, she participated in discussions that led to the creation of a master's degree program in women's studies at the University of Costa Rica. In 1987, she organized the First Workshop on Women's Human Rights, promoted by the Inter-American Institute of Human Rights.

During the 1990s, she was involved in activities related to the World Conferences on Human Rights, Women, and the establishment of the International Criminal Court. She was one of the organizers of the satellite conference "La Nuestra," held in preparation for the Regional Conference on Human Rights, and served on the coordinating team for the Tribunal on Violence Against Women during the Vienna Conference. She also helped organize and served as a judge at the People's Tribunal held during the Sixth Feminist Meeting in El Salvador. In addition, she has served as a judge on tribunals in Costa Rica, Haiti, and Ecuador.

Facio has drafted several laws addressing violence against women and was among the first legal scholars to criticize androcentrism in human rights theory and legal practice. In 1994, she prepared the NGO report on violence against women in the Caribbean and Latin America for the preparatory conference in Mar del Plata. She was the only Latin American candidate for the newly created position of Special Rapporteur on violence against women, its causes and consequences, which was ultimately awarded to Radhika Coomaraswamy.

In 1998, she served as a witness at the tribunal commemorating the 50th anniversary of the Universal Declaration of Human Rights. Since 1999, she has been a member of the advisory committee of the campaign "Women's Rights Are Not Optional" and has advised IWRAW (International Women's Rights Action Watch Asia Pacific), JASS, and other women's organizations.

Since 2005, she has served on the Advisory Committee for the United Nations Secretary-General's In-depth Study on Violence Against Women. Since 1990, Facio has participated as a speaker and adviser at conferences and meetings organized by United Nations agencies, governments, and civil society organizations on topics including gender-based violence against women, sexual and reproductive rights, legislation, and women's human rights.

Among her principal contributions, Facio has helped develop legislation to combat violence against women. She has taught courses on law and gender at Costa Rican and international universities and has written books analyzing law from a gender perspective.

She was appointed by the United Nations Human Rights Council to serve on the Working Group on discrimination against women and girls, becoming the only Latin American member of the expert body responsible for monitoring discrimination against women in law and practice worldwide.

Together with other ecofeminists, Facio helped establish the Comuna de la Luna Llena and the Women's Human Rights Institute (WHRI), an intensive training course now offered at the University of Toronto. She has also collaborated with JASS, an organization that supports feminist movements around the world.
