= Sol Picciotto =

British academic

Sol Picciotto (born 1942) is a British academic, emeritus professor of law at Lancaster University.

== Life ==
Sol Picciotto was born in Aleppo, Syria in 1942, of Jewish parents. His family left Syria in 1947 to 1948, and he was educated at Manchester Grammar School. Picciotto was educated at the University of Oxford (BA) and the University of Chicago (JD). Picciotto has been joint editor of the International Journal of the Sociology of Law, and founding joint editor of Social and Legal Studies and an editorial consultant on the Australian Journal of Law and Society. He is a senior adviser at the Tax Justice Network.

Picciotto's students have included Attiya Waris who is also involved with the Tax Justice Network.

== Publications ==
- and John Holloway (eds.), State and Capital: A Marxist Debate, 1978
- International Business Taxation (Weidenfeld and Nicolson, 1992)
- Corporate Control and Accountability (OUP 1993)
- International Regulatory Competition and Coordination (OUP, 1996)
- Regulating International Business - Beyond Liberalization (Macmillan, 1999)
- Regulating Global Corporate Capitalism (2011)
