= Tamana Zaryab Paryani =

Afghan journalist and women's rights activist

- تمنا زریاب پریانی
- Born: 1997 (age 28–29); Afghanistan
- Occupations: Journalist, women's rights activist
- Awards: 100 Women (BBC) (2022)

Tamana Zaryab Paryani (Arabic: تمنا زریاب بریانی; born 1997) is an Afghan journalist and women's rights activist known for her protests against Taliban rule in Afghanistan. She is widely recognised as a symbol of the women's struggle in Afghanistan. In December 2022, Tamana was named as one of BBC's 100 Women. She is a member of an Afghan women's rights activist group Seekers of Justice. She fled Afghanistan in August 2022 and now lives in Germany.

== Biography ==
Tamana was born in 1997 and has four sisters. When NATO troops were in Afghanistan, she graduated in journalism. Tamana also ran as a candidate for the Afghan National Assembly.

In 2018, Tamana founded the Tamana Cultural Social Organization and in 2021 created the movement of liberated women. She organized demonstrations against Taliban rule and became an activist for women's rights and against the new dictatorship regime. She also joined the group of women activists called Seekers of Justice. They organized a protest on 16 January 2022 in Kabul. In 19 January, Tamana was detained at her apartment in Kabul, where she was abused, tortured, and interrogated for three weeks along with her three younger sisters. She was able to record her reactions to the arrest and share them online. The video went viral, drawing attention to the disappearance of female activists. Tamana was charged by the Taliban of breaking their new laws, specifically for publicly burning a burqa.

Despite the Taliban banning her from leaving the country, Tamana along with her sisters entered Pakistan from the Spin Boldak border on August 15, 2022, and reached Germany where she later lived.

In September 2023 she joined a group of women who started a hunger strike that lasted for ten days to protest the treatment of women in Afghanistan. Her fellow protesters included Wahida Amiri and Nayera Kohistani.

== Recognition ==
In 2021, Tamana was included in the 100 Women list by BBC.
