= Wahida Amiri =

Afghani activist

- Born: Kabul, Afghanistan
- Education: Dunya University
- Occupation: Librarian
- Known for: Women's rights activism

Wahida Amiri is an Afghan librarian and women's rights activist. She was featured in the BBC 100 Women 2021 for her continued efforts protesting against the Taliban and their ban on women's education and right to work.

== Early life ==
Amiri was born in Kabul, Afghanistan, and started school in 1996, just before the Taliban entered government. One of their orders was to shut schools to girls, and Amiri found her education halted. Many of her relatives fled to Panjshir, in the north of Afghanistan, but her father chose to stay. Amiri's father remarried after her mother died, and the family relocated to Pakistan. She was expected to cook and clean for the family.

When Amiri was 15, the Taliban lost power following the September 11 attacks. The family then returned to Kabul, where education was opened to girls again, and women could work. However, life remained the same for Amiri, cooking and cleaning for her family as opposed to accessing the education now open to her. Five years after returning to Kabul, Amiri was eventually encouraged to enroll in school by her cousin.

After school, Amiri was accepted into Dunya University to study law, where she discovered her love of Virginia Woolf, reading "A Room of One's Own". Amiri opened a small library after graduating, where she hosted discussions about feminism over chai sabzi, traditional Afghan green tea with cardamom.

== Activism ==
The Taliban returned to power on 15 August 2021, and immediately began to re-impose restrictions on women's freedom. Amiri turned up to work and found the door locked, and her library closed. She subsequently joined the "Spontaneous Movement of Fighting Women of Afghanistan", where she marched on the streets with fellow women to advocate for women's right to work. They were met with tear gas, shots in the air, and even beatings. Amiri continued despite this.

Following the arrest of many fellow protesters, Amiri moved to a safe house to escape the Taliban. However, she and a number of other women were arrested in February 2022 and taken to the Ministry of Interior Affairs, where they were kept for 18 days.

Whilst there, she was required to speak on video, saying her name and who was helping her. She was also told to say that Afghan protesters abroad had told her to protest. This statement gave the impression the female protesters marched to become famous, and to be evacuated from Afghanistan. Amiri stated this was harmful to the cause, particularly when the video was broadcast on Tolo News, a major Afghan news channel.

Amiri and the other female protesters were eventually released, and told not to protest again. The Taliban retained her family's house documents to ensure she would not defy their authority in the future. She left Afghanistan on her family's persuasion and then lived in Pakistan.

In September 2023 she joined a group of women who started a hunger strike that lasted for ten days to protest the treatment of women in Afghanistan. Her fellow protesters included Tamana Zaryab Paryani and Nayera Kohistani.
