= Mary Lawlor (human rights advocate) =

Irish academic and human rights advocate

United Nations Special Rapporteur on the situation of human rights defenders
- Incumbent
- Assumed office 2020

Executive Director of Front Line Defenders
- In office 2001–2016

Director of the Irish branch of Amnesty International
- In office 1988–2000

Personal details
- Born: 1952 (age 73–74) Ireland
- Education: University College Dublin

Mary Lawlor is Adjunct Professor of Business and Human Rights in the School of Business of Trinity College Dublin. An Irish national, she is currently the United Nations Special Rapporteur on the situation of human rights defenders, appointed in May 2020. She is the founder and former Executive Director of Front Line Defenders and former director of the Irish branch of Amnesty International.

== Background ==
Lawlor was born in 1952 in Ireland, the second-eldest of seven sisters, and grew up in Kilmacud, a suburb of Dublin. She holds a first degree in philosophy and psychology, from University College Dublin, and postgraduate degrees in Montessori teaching and personnel management.

She was married in 1979.

== Career ==
The focus of Lawlor's career has been the protection of human rights defenders, after a few early years selling encyclopaedias in Canada, and teaching at kindergarten.

She joined the Irish branch of Amnesty International as a fundraiser, after meeting and being inspired by Seán MacBride. In 1975 she became a member of its Board and for four years from 1983 was national chair. From 1988 to 2000, she led the organisation as its director.

The following year, she founded Front Line Defenders, which actively protects those who work non-violently to uphold the human rights of others, as outlined in the Universal Declaration of Human Rights. She was the organisation's Executive Director from 2001 to 2016.

She helped draw up the EU Guidelines on the Protection of Human Rights Defenders, adopted by the Council of the European Union in June 2004.

In March 2020, Lawlor was appointed United Nations Special Rapporteur on the situation of human rights defenders, for a three-year term from 1 May 2020, succeeding Michel Forst. She was one of the many UN experts who spoke out against the sale of arms to Israel in June 2024 as a result of the conflict in Gaza. The experts cautioned arms suppliers and finance companies that they would be implicated in human rights violations. The signatories to the warning included special reporteurs Paula Gaviria Betancur, Tlaleng Mofokeng, Margaret Satterthwaite and Francesca Albanese.

== Other roles and awards ==
Lawlor currently serves on the boards of the Irish Council for Civil Liberties, the University College Dublin Centre for Ethics in Public Life, and the Norwegian Human Rights Fund.

In 2011, at the Irish Tatler Women of the Year Awards, she was awarded the 'Special Recognition' award at a ceremony at the Four Seasons Hotel in Dublin.

On 3 July 2014, Mary Lawlor was presented with the Order of Chevalier of the Legion of Honour by French Ambassador to Ireland, Mr Jean-Pierre Thebault, on behalf of the French government.

In 2016 she was awarded the Franco-German Award for Human Rights and the Rule of Law.
