= Margaret Satterthwaite =

American special rapporteur

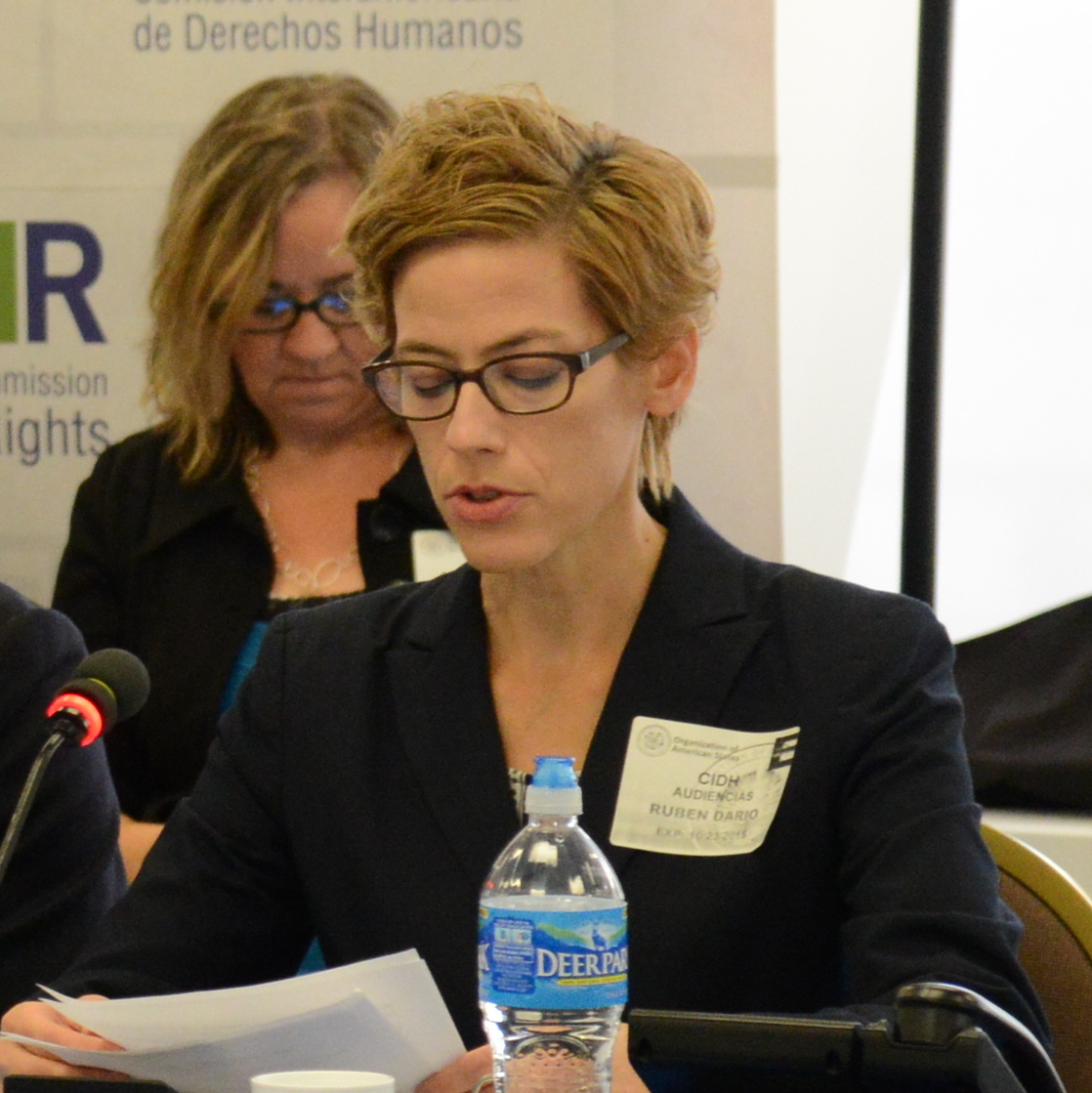
- Satterthwaite in 2015
- Born: Margaret Lockwood Satterthwaite; 1969 (age 56–57); USA
- Education: Eugene Lang College of the New School for Social Research (BA); University of California, Santa Cruz (MA); New York University School of Law (J.D. degree)
- Known for: United Nations special rapporteur on the independence of judges

Margaret Lockwood Satterthwaite (born 1969) is an American legal scholar serving as the special rapporteur on the independence of judges and lawyers for the United Nations. She has sent letters where she was concerned by legal cases including those in Kiribati and the United Kingdom, where the government was planning to overrule the judiciary.

== Life ==
Satterthwaite completed a BA degree in writing, Literature and Gender with a Jacob Burns Scholarship in May 1990 at Eugene Lang College of the New School for Social Research in New York. She received her master's degree in Literature from the University of California, Santa Cruz, in 1995. She received her J.D. degree from the New York University School of Law, magna cum laude, in 1999.

She clerked for Judge Betty Binns Fletcher at the US Court of Appeals for the Ninth Circuit and at the International Court of Justice in The Hague.

Satterthwaite is Professor of Clinical Law at New York University School of Law, where she heads the Global Justice Clinic. She became the faculty director of the Robert and Helen Bernstein Institute for Human Rights in 2015. She led the Center for Human Rights and Global Justice, starting in 2006.

In 2013, she and Jayne C. Huckerby published their book, Gender, National Security and Counter-terrorism: Human Rights Perspectives. It includes work by a variety of authors, and it includes a chapter by Satterthwaite on measuring the United States Agency for International Development's work to counter violent extremism.

== Special rapporteur ==
In October 2022, she was appointed as the United Nations Special Rapporteur on the independence of judges and lawyers by the Human Rights Council. This is a position that has existed since 1994.

In September 2023, she had written about her "serious alarm" to the President of Kiribati. He had ordered that the Australian judge David Lambourne who was married to the leader of the opposition should be deported. The pilot had refused to take him, and the island's senior judges had all been suspended for refusing to enforce the President's will. This had left the country with no senior court of appeal or any legal check on the government's powers.

In April 2024, she received a long letter from Nagananda Kodituwakku, who was a Sri Lankan lawyer and politician. He had been debarred from practicing law in 2019 following a dispute with a judge. He asked Satterthwaite to intervene in the case which resulted in him being barred from practicing law.

In 2024, she spoke out against the plans of the United Kingdom to send immigrants to Rwanda while they apply for political asylum. The government was passing laws to override the judiciary. The new law would command judges to decide that Rwanda was a "safe country" irrespective of any evidence that was brought to the court. She said that the governments changes to the law "constitute an interference with the independence of the judiciary and a violation of international law". She wrote of her concern in a joint letter with fellow rapporteurs, Siobhán Mullally and Gehad Madi, to the UK government.

In June 2024, she was one of the many UN experts who spoke out against the sale of arms to Israel as a result of the conflict in Gaza. The experts cautioned arms supplier and finance companies that they would be implicated in human rights violations. The list included special rapporteurs Reem Alsalem, Paula Gaviria Betancur, Tlaleng Mofokeng, Mary Lawlor, Claudia Flores and Francesca Albanese.

In 2025, Satterthwaite and Mexican judge Norma Lucía Piña Hernández each received the International Association of Judges's Judicial Independence Award.

== Works include ==
- A Social Science of Human Rights? A Conceptual Roadmap for Social Science Methods in Human Rights Fact-Finding, 2016 (with Justin Simeone)
- Measuring What We Treasure and Treasuring What We Measure: The Promise and Perils of Global Monitoring for the Promotion of Equality in the Water, Sanitation, and Hygiene Sector, 2014 (co-authored with Inga Winkler and Catarina de Albuquerque)
- Persuasive Visualization: Can Visualized Data Change Users’ Opinions? (with Enrico Bertini, Oded Nov, Anshul Pandey, and Anjali Manivannan)
- Gender, National Security, and Counter-Terrorism: Human Rights Perspectives, 2013 (co-edited with Jayne Huckerby, paperback, 2014)
- Human Rights Advocacy Stories, 2009 (co-edited with Deena Hurwitz and Douglas Ford)
