= Tlaleng Mofokeng =

South African physician and UN official (born 1982)

- Born: 29 July 1982 (age 44); Phuthaditjhaba, QwaQwa, South Africa
- Education: University of KwaZulu-Natal
- Occupations: Physician, author, broadcaster, health-rights advocate
- Known for: Advocacy for universal health access, HIV care, and sexual/reproductive rights United Nations Special Rapporteur on the Right to Health (first woman and first African in the role)
- Awards: BBC 100 Women (2021); Aspen Institute New Voices Senior Fellow (2018); Africa Youth Awards Most Influential Young Africans (2017); Bill & Melinda Gates Foundation 120 Under 40 Leader (2016); Mail & Guardian Top 200 Young South Africans (2016)
- Website: drtlaleng.com

Tlaleng Petronella Mofokeng (known as Dr T; born 29 July 1982) is a South African physician, author, broadcaster and health-rights advocate. She served as the United Nations Special Rapporteur on the right of everyone to the enjoyment of the highest attainable standard of physical and mental health from 2020 to 2026, the first woman and the first African to hold the post. She was earlier a commissioner of South Africa's Commission for Gender Equality from 2019 to 2024. Her book Dr T: A Guide to Sexual Health and Pleasure (2019; updated 2021) became a bestseller, and she was named to the BBC 100 Women list in 2021. In 2026 she became the Economic Freedom Fighters' candidate for mayor of Johannesburg.

== Early life and education ==
Mofokeng was born in the Bantustan of QwaQwa. She grew up during apartheid, and has said that witnessing military vehicles and protests as a child shaped her later activism. She has also described the memory of a helicopter dropping dental kits in her schoolyard, which she cites as an early example of the disconnect between state health interventions and the communities they were meant to serve.

Mofokeng graduated from the University of KwaZulu-Natal Nelson R. Mandela School of Medicine in 2007, and worked as a medical doctor in the Gauteng Health Department. She worked in pediatrics at the Charlotte Maxeke Johannesburg Academic Hospital and the West Rand clinics, and oversaw various health services.

== Medical, media and writing career ==
Mofokeng worked at Higher Education and Training HIV/AIDS Program (HEAIDS) on an educational video series to mitigate HIV in South Africa. She also presented medical documentaries for Al Jazeera. In 2015, Mofokeng joined International SOS, where she was responsible for medical care in Johannesburg. In this capacity, she chaired the Sexual and Reproductive Justice Coalition of South Africa.

Mofokeng has focused on gender equality, neonatal health, and HIV management. She was made the country lead of Global Doctors for Choice in 2017. She has taken on domestic violence in court, making use of the Committee on the Elimination of Discrimination against Women.

Mofokeng usually goes by "Dr. T". Her first book, Dr. T: A Guide to Sexual Health and Pleasure, a bestseller, was published by Picador in 2021. The Sunday Sun wrote, "the magic is contained in its warm, motherly, vulnerable and non-judgmental delivery". She is leading the delivery of Sentebale, a mobile health app that supports the physical and mental well-being of young Africans affected by HIV.

Mofokeng is an advocate for universal health access and adolescent health. She serves as an advisor of the United Nations University International Institute for Global Health Gender & Health Hub.

== Commission for Gender Equality (2019–2024) ==
In 2019, President Cyril Ramaphosa appointed Mofokeng to the Commission for Gender Equality (CGE) "on a full-time basis" in terms of Section 3 of the Commission on Gender Equality Act and Section 193(4)(b) of the Constitution, serving from 1 August 2019 to 30 April 2024.

During her tenure, Mofokeng was involved in the commission's investigation into the state of shelters for survivors of gender-based violence. She also called for greater government funding for organisations fighting GBV, saying in 2020: "You can have all the plans, but you have to put money ahead if you are to fight this disease."

== UN Special Rapporteur on the right to health (2020–2026) ==
In July 2020, Mofokeng was appointed United Nations Special Rapporteur on the Right to Health. She is the first woman and first African to hold this position. She was appointed to the board of directors of the International Partnership for Microbicides in 2021, and serves as Distinguished Lecturer at Georgetown University.

Mofokeng was one of the many UN experts who spoke out against the sale of arms to Israel in June 2024 as a result of the Gaza war. The experts cautioned arms suppliers and finance companies that they would be implicated in human rights violations. The signatories to the warning included special rapporteurs Paula Gaviria Betancur, Margaret Satterthwaite, and Francesca Albanese.

=== Thematic reports ===
Thematic reports by Mofokeng as Special Rapporteur
Year	Report	Topic
2021	A/HRC/47/28	Strategic priorities of work
2021	A/76/172	Sexual and reproductive health rights during COVID-19
2022	A/HRC/50/28	Violence and its impact on the right to health
2022	A/77/197	Racism and the right to health
2023	A/HRC/53/65	Digital innovation, technologies and the right to health
2023	A/78/185	Food, nutrition and the right to health
2024	A/HRC/56/52	Drug use, harm reduction and the right to health
2024	A/79/177	Harm reduction for sustainable peace and development
2025	A/HRC/59/48	Health and care workers as defenders of the right to health
2025	A/80/184	Health and care workers: the oath takers and defenders of the right to health
2026	A/HRC/62/66	"Health as an enabler of dignity" (final report)

=== An intersectional and anti-colonial framework ===
Throughout her mandate, Mofokeng applied what she called "an intersectional approach, building on anti-racist and anti-colonial frameworks." In a 2023 interview with the Stanford Social Innovation Review, she said: "Racism is not a factory fault; it was designed to yield these very inequalities we are facing. The remnants of racism and coloniality and imperialism permeate every sector of our society—economic, political, civil, socioeconomic, cultural. It permeates everywhere. And that's why we talk about structural discrimination. This is not an issue of individual people not liking other people. Racism is a structural matter that recognizes and humanizes certain people just by merely being white. And it systematically disenfranchises certain people because they're not white."

Mofokeng's mandate as United Nations Special Rapporteur on the right to health ran until 31 July 2026. In her final thematic report to the Human Rights Council, titled "Health as an enabler of dignity" (A/HRC/62/66), she focused on the right to health as an enabler of human dignity throughout the life course and examined violations of dignity—including stigma, discrimination, criminalization, coercion, and exclusion from decision-making—as root causes of poor health outcomes.

=== Sexual and reproductive health and LGBTIQ+ rights ===
Mofokeng frames sexual and reproductive health rights as integral to the right to health, and her mandate was marked by a focus on bodily autonomy, comprehensive sexuality education, and the rights of LGBTIQ+ people.

In March 2023, she co-authored, alongside the Independent Expert on sexual orientation and gender identity, the Special Rapporteur on the right to education and the Working Group on discrimination against women and girls, A Compendium on Comprehensive Sexuality Education. The compendium recalled the main international standards on comprehensive sexuality education and made "a specific call to States to ensure the right to CSE without discrimination." It argued that comprehensive sexuality education should be provided to all and be inclusive, and that it should not be obstructed in the name of religious and cultural values and beliefs.

In her 2022 report to the Human Rights Council, Mofokeng said that binary conceptions of gender shape how LGBTIQ+ people experience social, political, economic and legal structures, and urged states to widen the definition of gender-based violence to include violence based on sexual orientation, gender identity, and sex characteristics. She said: "This conceptualisation is one of the root causes of particularly brutal forms of gender-based violence, hate crimes and hate speech LGBTIQ+ people face. It is rooted in the desire to punish people whose identities, expressions and bodies do not conform to the heteronormative, man/woman binary system."

In 2023, Mofokeng warned the Council that digital technology allowed sensitive health data of people facing discrimination, including on grounds of sexual orientation, to be shared easily, and that data from mobile devices was being used against people seeking contraception or abortion where those services are illegal. She also said religious narratives should not be used to deny LGBT people their rights.

=== Gender-based violence ===
Mofokeng has worked on gender-based violence (GBV) throughout her career, both as a medical doctor and as an advocate. The OHCHR notes that she has worked as a first responder on matters of gender-based violence and has been an expert witness in court, drawing on the work of the Committee on the Elimination of Discrimination against Women (CEDAW) to defend the rights of abused women and ensure access to post-violence care.

In August 2026, during Women's Day discussions, Mofokeng said that women were "still not safe anywhere in South Africa", pointing to the gap between the constitutional rights won since 1956 and the daily reality of GBV and femicide. She argued that meaningful progress required swift judicial processes, rigorous law enforcement, stronger support systems for survivors, and broader community accountability, rather than annual awareness campaigns alone.

=== Gaza and the occupied Palestinian territory ===
From late 2023, Mofokeng issued a series of statements and reports on the destruction of the health system in Gaza. In December 2023 she said Israel had declared an "unrelenting war" on Gaza's health system, saying, "The healthcare infrastructure in the Gaza Strip has been completely obliterated."

In April 2024, she and Francesca Albanese, the Special Rapporteur on the occupied Palestinian territory, condemned the destruction of Al-Shifa Hospital. In August 2025, they issued a joint statement declaring that the targeted destruction of Gaza's healthcare system amounted to "medicide", which they described as "a sinister component of the intentional creation of conditions calculated to destroy Palestinians in Gaza which constitutes an act of genocide."

In July 2026, at the conclusion of her mandate, Mofokeng published A Compendium on Medicide: A Sub-text to Reproductive Genocide: A Public Health Crisis, which examines the gendered dimensions of conflict and genocide with particular reference to Gaza and Sudan.

On 5 October 2026, Mofokeng participated in the 17th annual Walk for Freedom, a five-kilometre march organised by the Palestine Solidarity Alliance (PSA) in Lenasia, south of Johannesburg. Described as one of South Africa's largest events for public solidarity with Palestine, the march featured a 25-metre-long banner bearing the names of more than 20,000 children killed in Gaza. PSA member Sunny Morgan said, "These are the names of real children who had their lives cruelly snatched away by Israel."

=== Country visits ===
During her tenure, Mofokeng conducted official country missions to assess the realisation of the right to health. She visited Luxembourg in April 2023, Costa Rica in July 2023, Chile from November to December 2024, Thailand in February 2025, and the Maldives in 2026.

On these visits, Mofokeng used an intersectional framework to assess the availability, accessibility, acceptability, and quality of healthcare, with particular attention to marginalised groups. After she went to Chile, her report highlighted unequal access caused by the country's bifurcated public-private health system and long wait times in the public sector, particularly affecting Indigenous peoples and persons deprived of liberty. The report also noted legal and practical barriers to accessing safe abortion.

== Political candidacy (2026) ==
In July 2026, Mofokeng was announced as the Economic Freedom Fighters' candidate for Mayor of Johannesburg at the party's 13th anniversary and manifesto launch in Thohoyandou. She was selected by EFF leader Julius Malema, who said: "How do you compare Dr Tlaleng with Helen Zille? The whole international servant at UN level, you compare it with a rusted person who goes around perpetuating racism and division and segregation and justifying colonialism." She contested the election against Helen Zille of the DA, Herman Mashaba of ActionSA, and others.

Mofokeng said she was targeting a 51% majority to avoid another coalition administration, arguing that Johannesburg must tackle corruption, financial mismanagement and political instability. She framed her campaign as an extension of her human-rights advocacy, saying her approach to governing would be based on "human dignity, transparency and accountability". She identified corruption as one of the city's biggest problems, saying: "We need to remove the fact that you are already expecting to be asked for a cool drink when JMPD stops you. We have to remove the expectation and the preparedness that taxi drivers have that they have extra cash on them when they get stopped."

=== Policy platform ===
Mofokeng's policy platform centred on several core areas. On healthcare, she proposed expanding access to comprehensive primary healthcare, including 24-hour clinics, and introducing a digital patient management system to allow residents to access repeat medication at any city facility, regardless of where they live. She also called for the formalisation of informal townships to enable basic infrastructure rollout and improved support for early childhood development centres, arguing: "It is the state's responsibility to make sure that children's rights to water, sanitation, nutritious food, shelter and education are met."

On municipal finances, she committed to writing off historical utility and municipal debt owed by registered indigent households and to introducing debt rehabilitation programmes to prevent accumulation. She pledged to insource municipal workers to create permanent jobs and end reliance on labour brokers and private middleman contractors, and promised to address service delivery basics, including potholes, leaking water pipes, outdated reservoirs, and sewer spills.

In a mayoral debate, Mofokeng said her first priority would be a comprehensive audit and review of all municipal entities, which she argued were burdened by bloated executive salaries, managerial boards, and excessively large executive suites. She said recovered funds would be redirected to hiring more JMPD officers for violence prevention and accelerating housing projects, with a specific focus on the backlog for people with disabilities. She also committed to working closely with the Auditor General and enforcing strict consequence management based on forensic reports.

Mofokeng proposed a "one-stop shop" to assist small and medium-sized businesses and township entrepreneurs with entry points, proof of address, licences, and apprenticeship certificates.

=== Campaign messaging ===
Mofokeng's campaign is framed around the EFF's Seven Cardinal Pillars, the party's founding ideological programme which calls for, among other things, expropriation of land without compensation, nationalisation of mines and banks, the abolition of tenders, and free quality education, healthcare, housing and sanitation for all. She has positioned her mayoral bid as an extension of these principles at the municipal level, arguing that access to functioning services, housing and infrastructure is a matter of dignity rather than mere administration.

At the EFF's manifesto rally in Thohoyandou, Mofokeng told supporters: "Create Johannesburg with us, so we can focus on structural changes that are required for sustainable change... I'm ready to serve you and to be in partnership with various sectors and citizens." She also said: "I solemnly swear to serve my community 24 hours a day. I solemnly swear to be a loyal councillor to my community and the people of South Africa. I will not be involved in corruption and stealing."

On the pillar of free quality healthcare, Mofokeng has proposed expanding 24-hour clinics and introducing a digital patient management system to allow residents to access repeat medication at any city facility. This builds on the EFF's existing municipal advances in maternal and obstetric units, which she has cited as a foundation to expand from.

On the pillar of building state capacity and abolishing tenders, she has pledged to insource municipal workers to create permanent jobs and end reliance on labour brokers and private middleman contractors. She has also committed to a comprehensive audit of all municipal entities, arguing that bloated executive salaries and wasteful corporate structures are draining resources that should go to frontline services.

On the pillar of open, accountable government, Mofokeng has said her approach would be based on "human dignity, transparency and accountability." She identified corruption as one of the city's biggest problems, saying: "We need to remove the fact that you are already expecting to be asked for a cool drink when JMPD stops you. We have to remove the expectation and the preparedness that taxi drivers have that they have extra cash on them when they get stopped." She has pledged to work closely with the Auditor General and enforce strict consequence management based on forensic reports.

On the pillar of land expropriation and redistribution, she has called for the formalisation of informal townships to enable basic infrastructure rollout, and for accelerating housing projects with a specific focus on the backlog for people with disabilities.

In October 2026, Mofokeng visited Vusikasilam, a community kitchen and garden in Kliptown, Soweto, that feeds between 70 and 120 people twice a week. She brought vegetable seedlings and worked alongside women cultivating the garden.

Mofokeng has also directly addressed the EFF's goal of moving away from coalition instability, saying she is targeting a 51% majority so that the party can govern Johannesburg without the fragile coalition arrangements that have characterised recent city administrations. She has argued that the city must tackle "corruption, financial mismanagement and political instability" as interconnected problems.

== Professional conduct proceedings (2025–2026) ==
In 2026 the Gauteng High Court set aside a Health Professions Council of South Africa (HPCSA) finding of unprofessional conduct against Mofokeng, together with the fine and the disciplinary charge that followed it, and dismissed the complaint that had prompted them.

In January 2025, during the Gaza ceasefire, Mofokeng, then UN Special Rapporteur on the right to health, shared an Al Jazeera report that Israeli Prime Minister Benjamin Netanyahu had delayed implementing the ceasefire until Hamas named the captives to be released, adding an expletive about him. UN Watch executive director Hillel Neuer called on the UN to discipline her, and on 20 January she replied in further posts directed at him, using insulting language. The South African Zionist Federation (SAZF) complained to the HPCSA, arguing that the posts breached social media ethics rules for medical professionals.

On 11 and 12 September 2025 the HPCSA's First Medical Committee of Preliminary Inquiry found Mofokeng guilty of unprofessional conduct and fined her R10,000 "for bringing the profession into disrepute for using inappropriate language on social media". The finding drew criticism from civil society and political organisations, including the Economic Freedom Fighters, who said the council had allowed itself to be weaponised by a pro-Israel lobby.

Mofokeng applied to the Gauteng High Court in Pretoria in April 2026 to review the decision. On 9 September 2026 the court granted an order by agreement between Mofokeng and the HPCSA, setting aside the committee's decision and fine and dismissing the complaint. Mofokeng said such complaints had a "chilling effect" on speaking out for Palestine.

== Recognition ==
Her work has drawn acclaim from civil society, institutions and the press. When she was appointed Special Rapporteur in 2020, the Wits Centre for Applied Legal Studies welcomed the appointment, saying that her focus on women's health and the rights of the LGBTIQA+ community was "especially significant in a country like ours and many others in the Global South where resources are limited and inequality based on sexual and gender identity is widespread." CALS added: "We can think of no-one better suited to this position. Over the years, we have watched Dr Mofokeng work tirelessly not only to provide quality health care to the people of our country, but to inform and advocate for them." The Aspen Institute's New Voices Fellowship called her "a longstanding advocate, activist, and champion for sexual and reproductive health and rights around the globe."

In a tribute published at the conclusion of her tenure in 2025, the Wits Centre for Applied Legal Studies wrote: "Dr Mofokeng has been a trailblazer in the global movement for health as a fundamental human right, reshaping the understanding of health beyond a service, but as a right that must be universally protected and upheld. Her impact has been profound, fundamentally transforming the legal and policy frameworks that govern health rights worldwide. Through her leadership, she has continually emphasized the importance of intersectionality in understanding healthcare access." CALS also noted that she "has also stood as a strong advocate for the health rights of Palestinians, focusing on the unique challenges faced by those in occupied territories. She has highlighted the severe consequences of restricted movement, limited medical supplies, and the destruction of healthcare infrastructure."

In 2025, Mofokeng received the ICFP Luminary Award, which cited her work "shaping policy, clinical practice, and public discourse on SRHR, advocating for adolescent health, transgender-affirming care, abortion access, and gender justice." The ICFP called her "a global health expert" whose "work chairing the Lancet Commission on Racism, Structural Discrimination and Global Health exemplifies her commitment to building equitable systems that protect dignity and advance human rights."

She was named to the BBC 100 Women list in 2021, and featured on the cover of Forbes Africa's "Over 30 Under 50" issue in 2024.

== Awards and honours ==
- 2016: Mail & Guardian One of the top 200 Young South Africans
- 2016: Bill and Melinda Gates Foundation 120 Under 40 Leader
- 2017: Africa Youth Awards Most Influential Young Africans
- 2018: Aspen Institute New Voices Senior Fellow
- 2019: Glamour Woman of the Year in Health
- 2021: BBC 100 Women
- 2023: Clinix Global Excellence Award
- 2024: Forbes Africa "Over 30 Under 50"
- 2025: ICFP Luminary Award

== Selected works / bibliography ==
- Mofokeng, Tlaleng (2021). Dr T: A Guide to Sexual Health and Pleasure. Picador Africa. ISBN 978-1-77010-770-0.
- Mofokeng, Tlaleng; et al. (March 2023). A Compendium on Comprehensive Sexuality Education (Report). OHCHR.
- Mofokeng, Tlaleng (July 2026). A Compendium on Medicide: A Sub-text to Reproductive Genocide: A Public Health Crisis (Report). OHCHR.

== See also ==
- United Nations Special Rapporteur
- Commission for Gender Equality
- Healthcare in South Africa
- Gender-based violence in South Africa
