= Vanessa Frazier =

Maltese diplomat (born 1969)

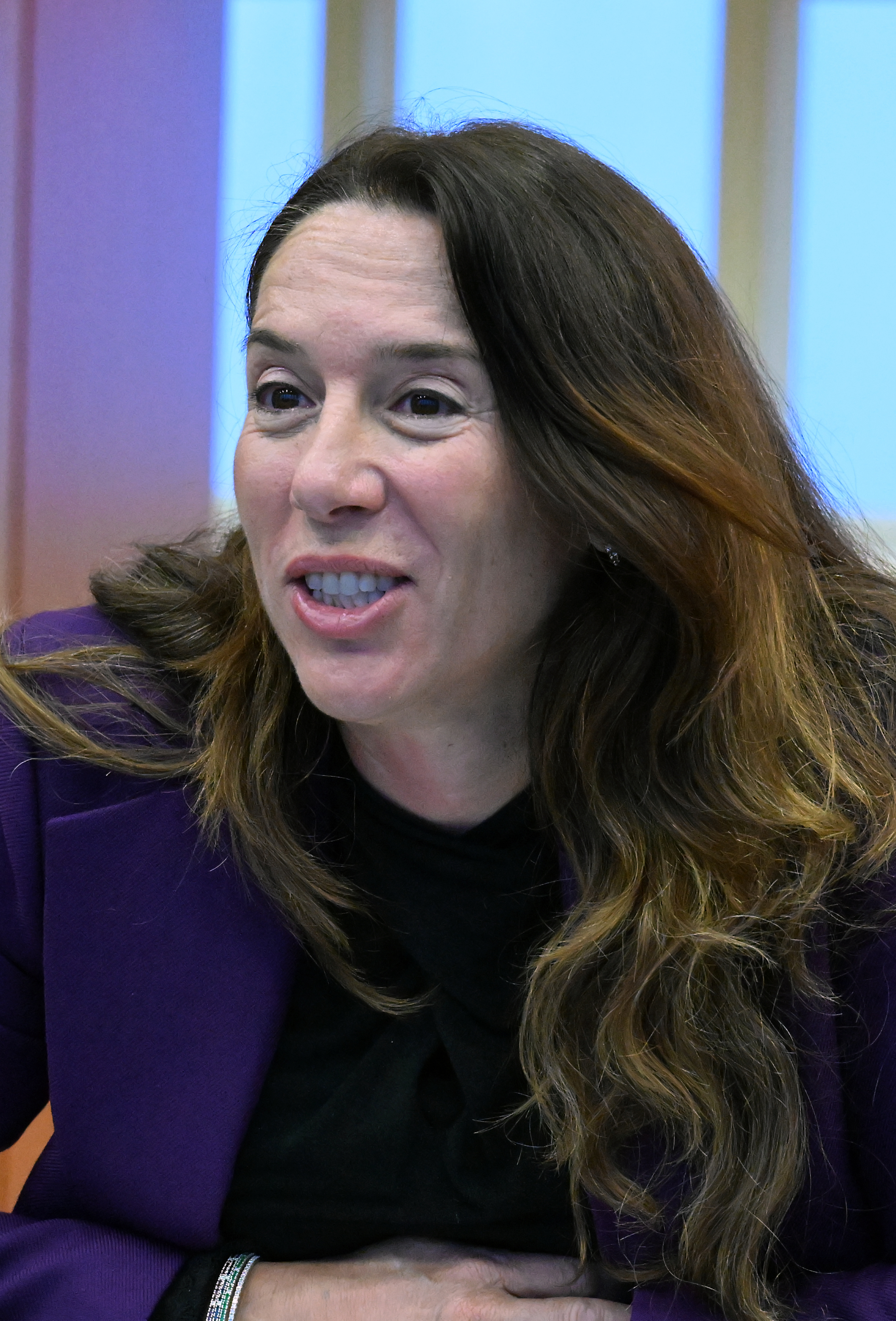
- Frazier in 2024
- Born: May 24, 1969 (age 57)
- Education: Luther College; University of Malta
- Occupation: Diplomat
- Office: Special Representative for Children and Armed Conflict (2025−present); Permanent Representative of Malta to the United Nations (2020−2025)

Vanessa Frazier (born 24 May 1969) is a Maltese diplomat who has served as the United Nations Secretary-General's Special Representative for Children and Armed Conflict since October 2025. She was previously the Permanent Representative of Malta to the United Nations from 2020 to 2025.

== Education ==
Frazier obtained a Bachelor’s degree in business management and French from Luther College in the United States and a Master’s degree in diplomatic studies, majoring in international law, from the University of Malta. She holds an honorary doctorate in recognition of her career achievements.

== Career ==
She began her diplomatic career as a student diplomat in 1992 and was appointed to the post of First Secretary in 1994. She served in the Ministry of Foreign Affairs as a Desk Officer for the United States and the Americas and was later redeployed to the Mediterranean Department. She was posted to London and Washington, D.C., before being appointed Ambassador to Belgium, Luxembourg and NATO before becoming Ambassador to Italy in 2013, where she was also accredited to San Marino and the Rome-based United Nations bodies.

In 2020 she was appointed Permanent Representative of Malta to the United Nations in New York, and the following year also became the Permanent Representative of Malta to the International Seabed Authority.

At the United Nations, she was elected Chair of the Second Committee for the 76th session of the General Assembly in 2021. She is the first woman to lead all women members Second Committee and the first woman to hold the position of Malta Permanent Representative to the UN.

She served as the President of the United Nations Security Council in February 2023 and in April 2024.

In October 2025 Frazier succeeded Virginia Gamba as the United Nations Secretary-General's Special Representative for Children and Armed Conflict since October 2025.
