= Paula Gaviria Betancur =

Colombian lawyer

Paula Gaviria
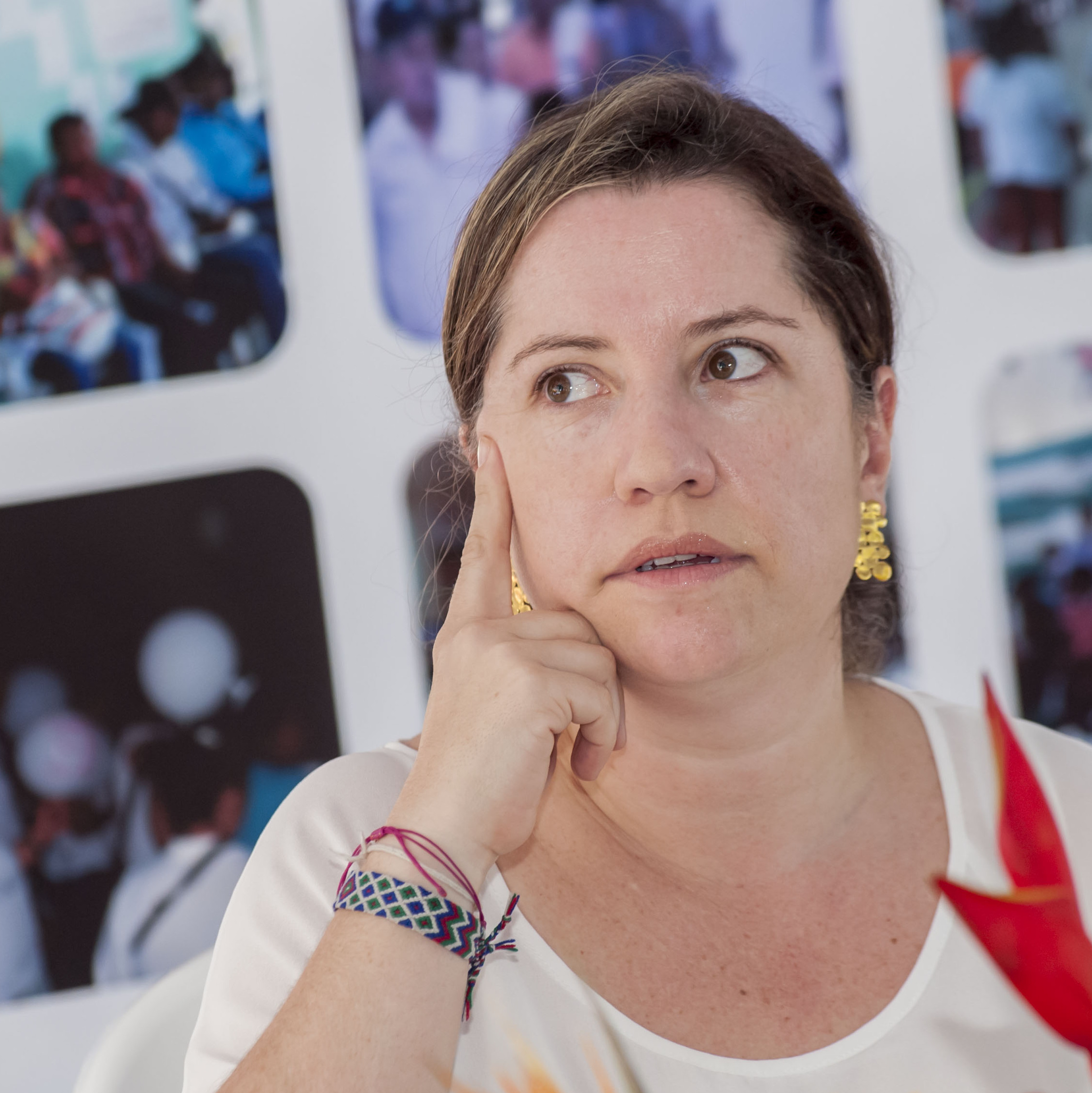
- Other name: Paula Gaviria Betancur
- Education: University of the Andes
- Occupation: lawyer
- Employer: Constitutional Court of Colombia et al
- Known for: United Nations Special Rapporteur
- Predecessor: Cecilia Jimenez-Damary

Paula Gaviria Betancur is a Colombian lawyer who was appointed to be a Presidential advisor and a United Nations Special Rapporteur. In each case her expertise was in displaced people. She has made visits to the Marshall Islands, Mozambique and the DRC.

== Life ==
Gaviria was born in the country's capital of Bogotá on 15 May 1972. Her grandfather, Belisario Betancur, was a President of Colombia in the 1980s. She graduated in law at the University of los Andes and then took post graduate qualifications in Journalism and Political Marketing. Her early career was spent at Colombia's Constitutional Court.

In 2011 the Colombian government put into place what was called the Victim's Law after decades of conflict with the rebel organization FARC and drug cartels. The law required that the millions of victims of conflict (including four millions who had been displaced) should be compensated. Gaviria became responsible for this law and the Victim's Unit (Unidad para las Víctimas). She oversaw the creation of the Victims Registry.

In 2016 Gaviria became the Colombian President's advisor on human-rights. She assisted the government in establishing a peace agreement with Colombian Government and the Revolutionary Armed Forces of Colombia (FARC-EP). She argued that the agreement needed to take accounts of the views of the victims. Her work was recognised by the World Bank when she received the José Edgardo Campos Collaborative Leadership award in 2016. She ceased to be the President's advisor in 2018 she led Nobel Laureate Juan Manuel Santos's Compaz Foundation.

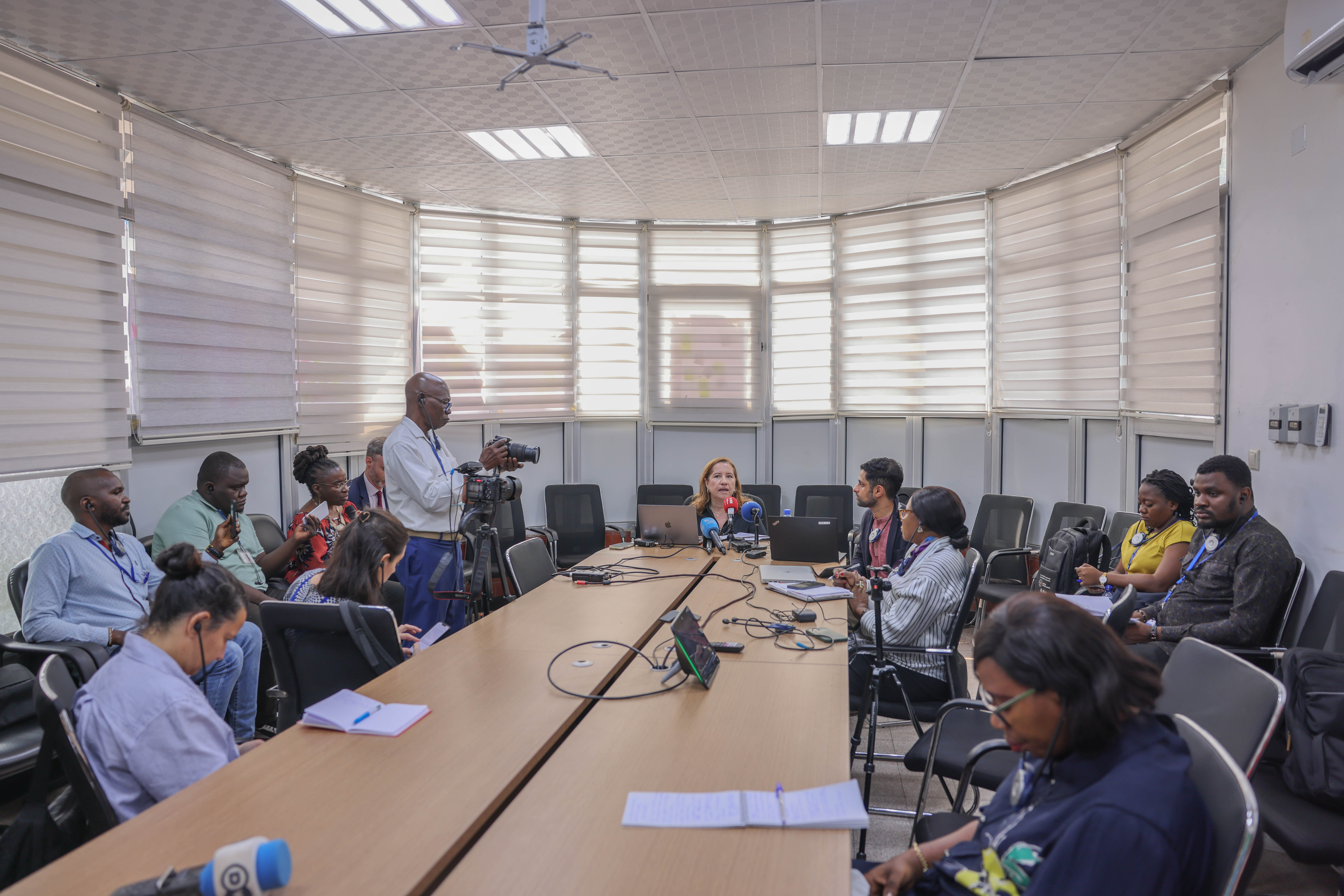
Special Rapporteur, Paula Gaviria Betancur, in 2025 in the DRC

In 2022, she was appointed Special Rapporteur on the human rights of internally displaced persons, succeeding Cecilia Jimenez-Damary from the Philippines who served from 2016. Gaviria took office on 1 November 2022. She stated that she would work for sustainable solutions and in particular the use of the private sector to break cycles of displacement.

Gaviria has describes climate change, generalized violence, wars and migration processes as the most important causes of internal displacement. She stresses that the participation of those affected is essential for the development of solutions. A key task of those responsible for politics is prevention .

In June 2024, she visited Mozambique to look at progress which she did with the cooperation of the government. She went to Maputo and outlying provinces. Her report identified additional work but this was on top of what she called "remarkable progress". Later that year she went to the Marshall Islands in the pacific for ten days. She drew attention of the global community to the two challenges facing the country. Historically people have been displaced and land has been polluted by nuclear weapons testing. More recently the islanders face the threat of rising water levels due to climate change.

In 2025, she visited the Democratic Republic of the Congo (DRC) where there are 7 million displaced people. In addition there is armed conflict and she met some of the leaders. She called for international assistance and leadership from the government.
