= Andrea Kalin =

American filmmaker

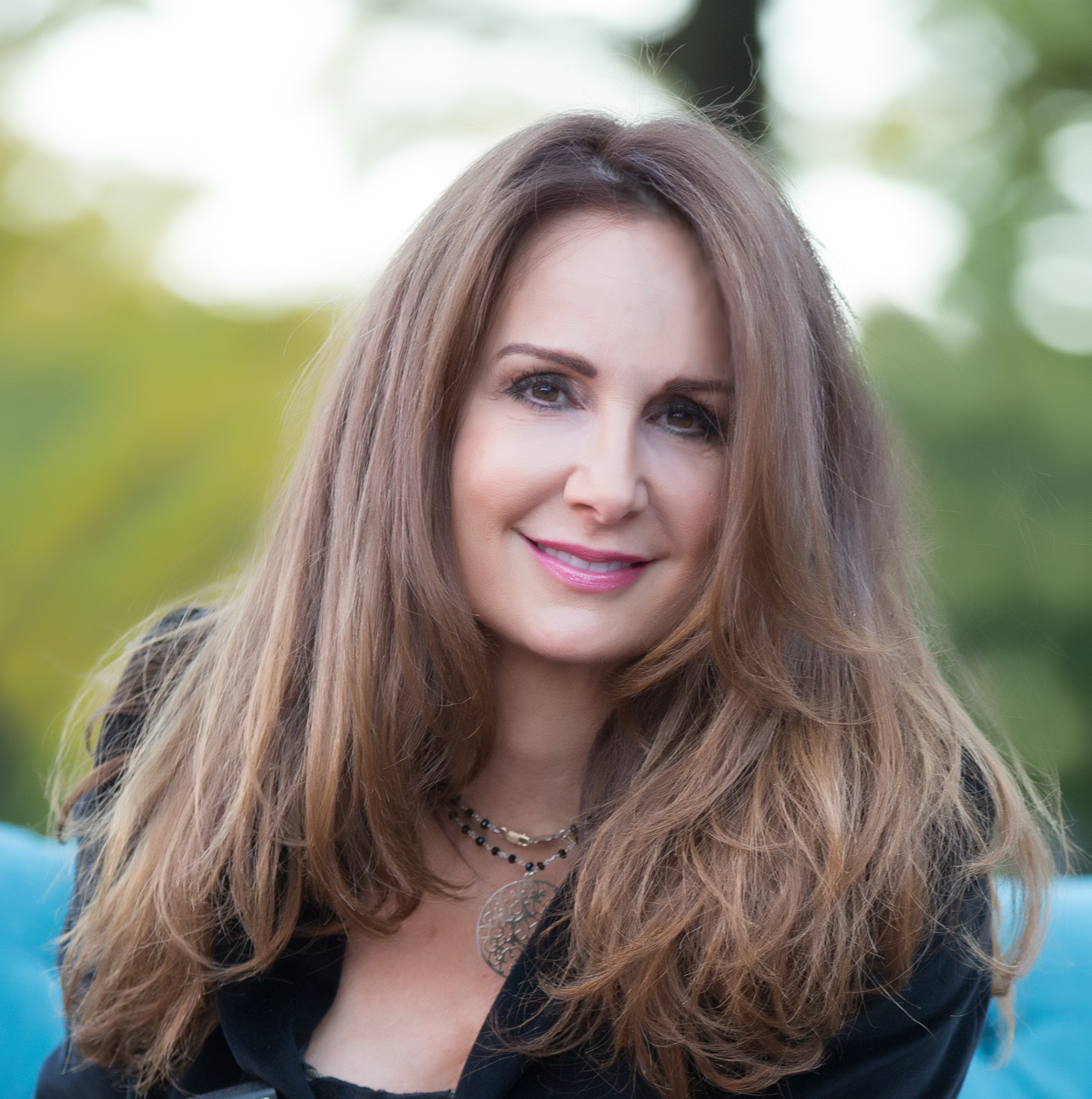
- Born: Boston, Massachusetts; United States
- Occupation: Filmmaker
- Writing career
- Genre: Documentaries

Andrea Kalin is an American independent filmmaker, writer, producer, and director. She is also the principal and founder of Spark Media and founder and executive director of Stone Soup Productions, a 501(c)(3) non-profit foundation.

== Personal life ==
Kalin was born in Boston, Massachusetts. She attended Brookline High School in Brookline, Massachusetts and graduated from American University with a Bachelor of Arts in criminal justice and corrections. Kalin lives and works in Washington, D.C. and is the founder and owner of Spark Media a documentary production company.

== Filmmaking ==
Andrea Kalin is a documentary filmmaker who focuses on social, mental health and women's health issues. She uses storytelling and marketing strategies to promote social change and raise awareness to societal problems, such as women's health issues and suicide. Some of her productions, such as Prince Among Slaves, Partners of the Heart, and Soul of a People, tell stories lost to history, while others—No Evidence of Disease, Scattering CJ, and The Pact address contemporary social issues, such as women's "below the belt" (GYN) cancers, suicide and inner city male role models.

Kalin started as a newsreel researcher for Ken Burns on his film The Congress.

=== 2020–2024 ===
In 2021, Andrea Kalin began production of a documentary film entitled Public Defender The film is about a DC left-leaning public defender named Heather Shaner who represents over a dozen January 6 defendants with a commitment to rehabilitating her clients through education. A lawyer hoped history books would help her Capitol riot clients grow. She was called a traitor — and worse. In the days after the January 6, 2021 attack, Heather Shaner, Esq. got a call from the Federal Defender's Office asking her to represent those charged with crimes related to January 6. Heather weighed the decision and elected to take on a handful of nonviolent misdemeanants. Her intent was not to get her clients off the hook for sedition but to understand how an average American could become so radicalized. The film features a number of her clients. Public Defender premiered at Mountainfilm in May 2024, where it won the Moving Mountains Award for social justice and impact.

=== 2016–2020 ===
Kalin's film, Scattering CJ, the story of CJ Twomey, a seemingly happy Air Force recruit who violently ended his own life at age 20, whose passing plunged his family into unrelenting grief and guilt. Years later, in a moment of desperate inspiration, his mother put out an open call on Facebook, looking only for a handful of world travelers who might help fulfill her son's wish to see the world by scattering some of his ashes in a place of beauty or special meaning to them – a call that 21,000 would answer. Scattering CJ had its world premiere at the Camden International Film Festival in September 2019. Scattering CJ was broadcast nationally on PBS in 2022. Scattering CJ earned awards from industry and film festivals including 2020 Audience Award from the Diff Film Festival and social impact awards awarded by Impact DOCS (Award of Excellence) and the Accolade Global Film Competition (Award of Excellence). The film was screened in a number of film festivals including Emerge Film Festival, Diff Film Festival, Salem Film Festival, Annapolis Film Festival, Richmond International Film Festival, Docutah, 320 Festival, Female Filmmakers Fuse Film Festival, Real Abilities Film Festival Boston, and FlickFair.

In 2017, Kalin directed, produced and wrote First Lady of the Revolution, a feature-length documentary about Henrietta Boggs, the American woman from Birmingham, Alabama who was married to José Figueres Ferrer during the years of the Costa Rican Civil War and served as the First Lady of Costa Rica from 1948 to 1949. The film premiered at the Sidewalk Moving Picture Festival in 2017 and has won numerous awards on the festival circuit. The documentary also had a limited theatrical release in Costa Rica and New York City and was broadcast on the American Public Television WORLD channel documentary series, Reel South.

=== 2010–2015 ===
In 2013, Kalin directed and produced No Evidence of Disease, a feature-length documentary film about N.E.D., a rock band of six gynecologic oncologists who seek to bring more attention and awareness to women's cancers. The film tells the story of the band members – their personal lives, as doctors, and as musicians – and also takes a look into the world of GYN cancers, where patients struggle to fight the disease and advocacy groups and activists seek to raise awareness and research funds for gynecological cancer research and funding. The film premiered at the LA Femme International Film Festival.

In 2014, Kalin released the film Red Lines, a feature-length documentary, depicting the ongoing civil war in Syria and the efforts of activists Mouaz Moustafa and Razan Shalab-al-Sham to raise international support for the revolution and to promote democracy in the Middle East. Red Lines debuted in Toronto, Ontario, Canada at the Hot Docs film festival in April 2014, where it was named in the festival's Top 20 Audience Picks. Red Lines was a competition finalist at the 2014 Woodstock Film Festival, which was also the films US premiere. The UK premiere took place September 25 at the Rich Mix Cultural Foundation.

=== 2000s ===
Kalin's films have received industry awards and nominations a Gracie Allen Award, CINE Golden Eagles, EdPress Awards of Distinction, The Chris Awards, a Paul Robeson award, a Gold UNESCO medal at the NY Festivals, the 2004 Organization of American Historians "(OAH)" Erik Barnouw Award for best documentary concerning a topic of American History, Black Maria Film Festival Jury Awards and a nomination from the Writers Guild of America for outstanding achievement in television (documentary non current events) among others.". Kalin was an Executive Consultant on Something The Lord Made, a made-for-television biographical drama film which received three Prime Time Emmy awards from nine nominations.

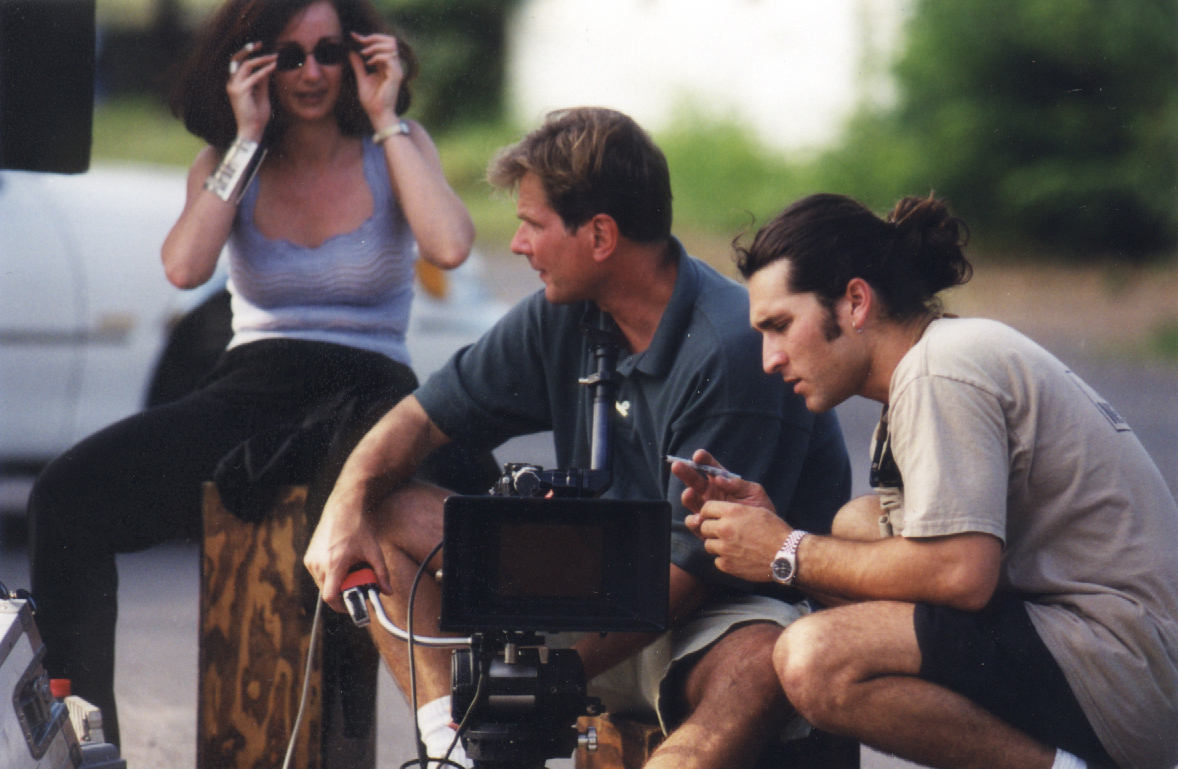
Director, Andrea Kalin & Director of Photography, John Rhode, Partners of Heart

Her first feature-length documentary film Partners of the Heart was inspired by Katie McCabe's Washingtonian article "Like Something the Lord Made", which formed the basis for the Emmy winning HBO film of the same name. Partners of the Heart" is the story of the 34-year partnership between Dr. Alfred Blalock, a white surgeon and Vivien Thomas, a black lab technician . At the height of segregation, Blalock and Thomas pioneered a procedure that saved the lives of thousands of children, called blue babies and opened up the field of heart surgery. With no more than a high school education, Thomas went on to train a generation of heart surgeons. The documentary was funded by the National Endowment of the Humanities NEH, the Corporation of Public Broadcasting CPB and WGBH, and was screened at a number of film festivals and aired on WGBH's American Experience in February 2003 and was rebroadcast in March 2005. Narrated by Morgan Freeman 'Partners of the Heart' went on to win the Erik Barnouw Award for Best History Documentary in 2004. Partners of the Heart also won a Gold TIVA-DC Peer award in the Documentary "Classic" Category.

Andrea Kalin served as the Executive Consultant for the "Something the Lord Made" film. "Something the Lord Made" was produced by Robert Cort, directed by Joseph Sargent, written by Peter Silverman and Robert Caswell, and starred Mos Def and Alan Rickman. "Something the Lord Made" was nominated for nine Emmy Awards (including acting nominations for both principals) and won three, for Best Made for Television Movie, Best Cinematography (Don Morgan) and Best Picture Editing (Michael Brown). It also received two Golden Globe nominations, Black Reel Awards for Best Film and Best Supporting Actor (Clayton LeBouef, in the role of Thomas' activist brother Harold), an NAACP Image Award, a Directors Guild of America Award for director Joseph Sargent, and a Writers Guild of America Award for scriptwriters Peter Silverman and Robert Caswell. The American Film Institute named "Something the Lord Made" "Best Television Movie of the Year for 2004" and called it "a revelation...a bittersweet story [that] is an important tool for America as it continues to search for a public vocabulary to discuss issues of race.

In the Fall 2002 issue, Andrea Kalin was featured in an article in the magazine Jewish Women International as one of "10 Jewish Women to Watch". Her picture appeared on the cover of that issue.

In 2006, Kalin went on to direct and produce The Pact (2006 film), a feature-length documentary based on a New York Times bestseller book, The Pact: Three Young Men Make a Promise and Fulfill a Dream. The film chronicles the true life story of Rameck Hunt, Sampson Davis, and George Jenkins, who made a pact in their inner-city high school in Newark, New Jersey, to find a way to go to college and then medical school. The Pact won the following awards and nomination: Indie Spec Best Documentary Award at the Boston International Film Festival, a 2006 CINE Golden Eagle award and a nomination for a 2006 Black Reel Best Independent Documentary. "The Pact (2006 documentary)" aired on American Public Television APT in 2008.

== Other documentary films ==
In 2007, Kalin produced, co-directed and co-wrote Prince Among Slaves, with Unity Productions Foundation. Prince is a feature-length documentary based on the biography of the same name about African Muslim-prince-turned-American-slave Abdul Rahman Ibrahima Sori written by Northern Virginia Community College history professor Terry Alford. Prince won numerous awards including the American Black Film Festival's Best Documentary award in 2007. the ITVA DC Peer Award (lighting, sound design, costume design, and music), Cine Golden Eagle, the 2008 intermedia-globe GRAND AWARD for documentaries and the Paul Robeson Award for documentaries. "Prince Among Slaves" premiered on PBS on February 4, 2008.

In 2009, Kalin, directed, co-produced, and co-wrote a National Endowment for the Humanities and Smithsonian Networks funded documentary about the Federal Writers' Project titled "Soul of a People: Writing America's Story", which includes interviews with notable project alumni Studs Terkel, Stetson Kennedy, Richard Ford, as well as American historians Douglas Brinkley and David Bradley. The documentary is narrated by Patricia Clarkson. "Soul of a People: Writing America's Story" premiered on Smithsonian Networks in September 2009 and has been rebroadcast a number of times The documentary includes footage from the Library of Congress & American Folklife Center, photographs revealing personal glimpses of the period and the FWP Writers, excerpts from the Project's life history interviews, slave narratives, and folk recordings preserved on acetate disk, and interviews with Project alumni. The film centers on the struggle between conflicting visions of America. "Soul of A People: Writing America's Story", which Andrea Kalin co-wrote with David Taylor and Olive Emma Bucklin, was nominated for a Writers Guild of America Award for outstanding achievement in television (documentary non-current events category) in December 2009. The American Library Association has been screening the documentary as part of the film's outreach nationwide. "Soul of A People: Writing America's Story" had a special screening in December 2009 at the Smithsonian Museum of American Art. In November 2009 at the National Press Club in Washington DC, "Soul of a People: Writing America's Story" won the TIVA-DC's Peer Award for "Best of DC". The film also received a silver trophy in the documentary category and a gold for screen writing.

In 2009, Kalin also produced and co-directed a documentary on the Smithsonian Folkways record label called Worlds of Sound: The Ballad Of Folkways, which premiered on Smithsonian Networks on October 25, 2009. "Worlds of Sound: The Ballad of Folkways" won a TIVA-DC Bronze award in the long form Documentary category (30 minutes and over) in November 2010. In addition, "Worlds of Sound: The Ballad of Folkways" won the Special Jury Award WorldFest – Houston International Film Festival, the Spring 2010 Cine Golden Eagle award and a Directors Jury Award (3rd) at the Black Maria Film and Video Festival.

In 2008, Kalin co-produced and co-directed Talking Through Walls. The film about how a struggle to build a mosque in Vorhees Township, New Jersey united a community. More specifically, it's a story of Zia Rahman, a retired engineer and devout Muslim American who prepared to go before the Zoning Board in his hometown in hopes of creating a mosque in his community. What Rahman didn't expect was the hostility and fierce pushback he received from his neighbors. In a world fraught with religious intolerance, Talking Through Walls is the story of how interfaith leaders in South Jersey figured out a way to keep the peace through compromise and tolerance.

In 2014, Kalin co-directed and produced a film on the Syrian conflict entitled Red Lines. The documentary film tells the story of the Syrian conflict through the lens of young Syrian activists. Red Lines won a number of documentary film awards including but not limited to Best Feature Documentary at the Woodstock Film Festival and two Humanitarian awards (the Accolade Competition, Global Film Awards and Tiburion Film Festival, Golden Reel Awards).

In 2017, Kalin had two films in production: The first is Scattering CJ, the story of CJ Twomey, a seemingly happy Air Force recruit who violently ended his own life at age 20, whose passing plunged his family into unrelenting grief and guilt. Years later, in a moment of desperate inspiration, his mother put out an open call on Facebook, looking only for a handful of world travelers who might help fulfill her son's wish to see the world by scattering some of his ashes in a place of beauty or special meaning to them – a call that 21,000 would answer. The second is about George Bridgetower called Sonata Mulattica, inspired by and based upon Rita Dove's poetry book by the same title.

== NGO Commissioned Films ==
In 2005, Kalin produced and directed Too Brief a Child, a film about how eighty-two million girls around the globe will be married annually before they leave adolescence causing them to lose their childhoods. "Too Brief A Child" explores the costs to the girls, their families and their communities including illiteracy, poverty, high infant and mother mortality, HIV/AIDs and loss of personal freedoms. The film was commissioned by the UNFPA. In 2005, "Too Brief A Child" was screened as part of the United Nations Association Film Festival; A Voice of Her Own, is a film that documents the transforming status of women in Asia. Funded by the Asian Development Bank, and shot on location in Cambodia, Bangladesh and the Philippines, the film looks at the changes underway of women's status in the region including the role women are playing in national economic development. "A Voice of Her Own" won the Chris Award; Commissioned by the IDB, Kalin Produced and Directed a film called "Battered Lives, Broken Trust" is a video program and outreach campaign on domestic violence; The InterAmerican Bank also commissioned Breaking the Poverty Cycle: Investing in Early Childhood Care and Development, a film about the importance of early childhood development and education on eliminating the inter-generational cycle of poverty; Commissioned by the Asian Development Bank, Kalin produced and directed the film "Asia's Water Crisis: The Struggle Within Each Drop", a film about Asia's severe growing water problems and how the water needs of growing urban Asian populations are competing with industry and agriculture. This short documentary chronicles how the region's supply, management and distribution of water is dwindling at alarming rates. The documentary was filmed in Sri Lanka, the Philippines and the People's Republic of China "Asia's Water Crisis" was screened at the 1998 U.S. Environmental Film Festival. won a Silver Screen award in 1998 at the International Film & Video Festival under the "Environmental Issues and Concerns category as well as a CINE Golden Eagle award in the environment category.

== Awards ==
In addition to winning a TIVA-DC Peer bronze, silver, gold (classic) award and "Best of DC" award for three of her documentaries in the documentary category, Spark Media also won five other TIVA-DC Peer film awards in 2010, including a gold for script writing for "Soul of a People: Writing America's Story" (David A. Taylor, Olive Emma Bucklin, Andrea Kalin-Spark Media); a bronze in the Education category for the training film: "Siemens: Export Control & Customs Awareness", produced and directed by James Mirabello/Spark Media); a bronze in the education category for a film on financial responsibility for NFL players called "Game On: Protecting Your Financial Future" (Andrea Kalin & Walter Gottlieb/Spark Media); a gold in the Audio Post Original Composition category for "Soul of a People: Writing America's Story", (Joseph Vitarelli, Wall Matthews- Spark Media); and a silver in the Audio Post Sound Mixing category for "Soul of a People: Writing America's Story" (Joe Powers, Clean Cuts/ Spark Media) Kalin also was an honored awardee in November 2010 of the Tikkun Olam Women's Foundation of Greater Washington ("TOWF"). TOWF is a non profit foundation dedicated to creating social change for women and girls through grants.

In addition to documentaries, Kalin also produced and directed a comedy concert film with Unity Productions Foundation featuring three Muslim-American comedians, titled "Allah Made Me Funny", which was theatrically released in seventeen markets across the US as well as in markets overseas. Michael Ordona of the Los Angeles Times observed: the film "has the potential to be culturally bridging in its way, and that makes looking for Muslim comedy in the Western world worthwhile.

Andrea Kalin produced a number of commissioned films for non-profits, NGOs and development banks including the Asian Development Bank (ADB), the Inter-American Development Bank (IADB), UNICEF, UNFPA, Refugees International, PCRM CSPI, the World Bank, the Urban Institute, Southeast Asian Refugees Association, and the NFPLA. For a number of years, Andrea Kalin provided media, interactive and broadcast reporting services to the Inter-American Development Bank IADB. Kalin established and operated a news bureau in the member bank country that was hosting the bank's annual meeting in order to provide live coverage of the meeting.

== Selected filmography ==
- The Pact
- Prince Among Slaves
- Partners of the Heart
- Talking Through Walls
- Allah Made Me Funny
- Asia's Water Crisis: The Struggle Within Each Drop
- Battered Lives, Broken Trust: When Men Abuse Women
- Too Brief a Child: Voices of Married Adolescents
- Vital Allies: Making Motherhood Save
- A Place at the Table
- Justice, Justice You Shall Pursue
- Breaking the Poverty Cycle: Investing in Early Childhood
- Bridges: Southeast Asians' American Journey
- Wired for Change: Information Technology for Development in the Americas
- A Voice of Her Own: Women and Economic Change in Asia
- From Rage to Recovery: Society's Search for Peace
- World Bank "HUNGER" Public Service Announcement
- The Soul of a People: Writing America's Story
- Hospice: A Testimony to Life
- Kitchen Fun for Kids
- The Real Scoop About Diet and Exercise
- School-to-Work, Connecting Youth to the Future
- Worlds of Sound: The Ballad Of Folkways
- The Wonder of Israel
- Land Use Analysis
- Urban Institute
- Art of Compassion
- Kuna Rape
- Youth and Development
- Game On: Protecting Your Financial Future
- Opening Doors to Compassion
- No Evidence of Disease N.E.D.
- Red Lines
- First Lady of the Revolution
- Public Defender (2024 film)
- Sonata Mulattica (in development)
- Smoke and Mirrors (in development)
- Scattering CJ
- The Low Cholesterol Gourmet (television-30 episodes)
