= First Lady of the Revolution =

- Directed by: Andrea Kalin
- Written by: Andrea Kalin
- Produced by: Andrea Kalin
- Starring: Henrietta Boggs
- Cinematography: Paulo Soto; Dennis Boni
- Edited by: David Grossbach
- Music by: Stephen Smith
- Production company: Spark Media
- Release date: August 27, 2016 (Sidewalk Moving Picture Festival)
- Running time: 71 minutes
- Country: United States
- Languages: English and Spanish

First Lady of the Revolution is a 2016 feature-length documentary film about former first lady of Costa Rica Henrietta Boggs. The documentary is a Spark Media film and was directed and produced by Andrea Kalin.

== Synopsis ==
While visiting an aunt and uncle in the exotic countryside of Costa Rica, a young southern belle from Alabama accepted a ride on the back of a motorcycle belonging to a local charismatic farmer — a ride that would propel her down narrow mountain roads and into history. First Lady of the Revolution is the story of Henrietta Boggs, who fell in love with a foreign land and the man destined to transform its identity. Her marriage to José Figueres Ferrer in 1941 led to a decade-long journey through activism, exile and political upheaval and, ultimately, lasting progressive reforms. First Lady of the Revolution is not only a depiction of the momentous struggle to shape Costa Rica's democratic identity; it's also a portrayal of how a courageous woman escaped the confines of a traditional, sheltered existence to expand her horizons into a new world, and live a life she never imagined.

== Release ==
First Lady of the Revolution debuted in Birmingham, Alabama, at the Sidewalk Moving Picture Festival on August 27, 2016, where it won the Audience Award for Best Alabama Film and a Jury Award Honorable Mention. Henrietta Boggs also received the inaugural Spirit of Sidewalk Award. The film had its Costa Rican premiere on September 13, 2016, at the Cine Magaly in San José, followed by a limited theatrical run in Costa Rica, New York City and Mexico.

The United States premiere was held at The Capri Theatre in Montgomery, Alabama, with Henrietta Boggs MacGuire and director Andrea Kalin in attendance and answering audience questions.

The film broadcast in 2018 as part of Reel South on PBS, a series that exhibits documentaries focusing on the Southern United States and the region's diverse voices and points of view.

== Reception ==
Following its premiere at Sidewalk Moving Picture Festival in 2016, Rick Harmon of Montgomery Advertiser wrote "It's a fascinating documentary...it leaves viewers hungering for more..." According to Eric Ginsburg of Triad City Beat First Lady of the Revolution "offers a unique perspective on a conflict that’s often overlooked." First Lady of the Revolution was the winner of the Audience Choice Award at the Fairhope Film Festival and the Hoka Award for Best Documentary Feature at the Oxford International Film Festival. The film also won three TIVA-DC awards, an IndieFEST Award of Excellence, an Accolade Global Film Competition Award of Excellence (Special Mention), and a Spotlight Award.

== Production team ==
- Director: Andrea Kalin
- Writer: Andrea Kalin
- Producer: Andrea Kalin
- Executive Producer: Martin Kalin
- Co-Producers: James Mirabello & Paulo Soto
- Associate Producer: Ethan Oser
- Directors of Photography: Dennis Boni & Paulo Soto
- Editor: David Grossbach
- Art Director: Luis G. Portillo
