= No evidence of disease =

No evidence of disease, or N.E.D., may refer to:

- A medical term for complete remission, mostly used in cancer-treatment
- N.E.D., a rock band composed of medical doctors
  - No Evidence of Disease, a 2013 documentary about the band
