= Dyalá Jiménez Figueres =

Costa Rican lawyer and politician (born 1972)

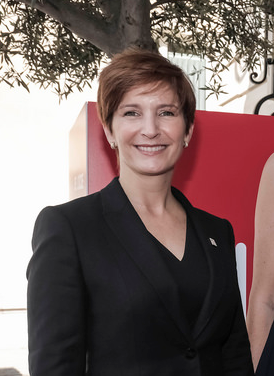
- Jiménez Figueres in 2018

Minister of Foreign Trade
- In office 3 July 2018 – 7 August 2020
- President: Carlos Alvarado Quesada
- Preceded by: Alexander Mora Delgado
- Succeeded by: Andrés Valenciano Yamuni

Personal details
- Born: 16 March 1972 (age 54) San José, Costa Rica
- Spouse: Roberto Álvarez (m. 2003)
- Children: 2
- Relatives: José Figueres Ferrer (grandfather); Henrietta Boggs (grandmother); José María Figueres (uncle)
- Education: University of Costa Rica; Georgetown University

Dyalá Jiménez Figueres (born 16 March 1972) is a Costa Rican lawyer specialized in international arbitration and politician. She served as Minister of Foreign Trade of Costa Rica between 2018 and 2020. She is member of the International Council of Arbitration for Sport.

== Early life ==
Jiménez was born in 1972 in Hospital México of San José, Costa Rica. She is the elder daughter of politician and ambassador Danilo Jiménez Veiga, who died in 1996 at the age of 75, and his maternal grandparents were president José María Figueres and first lady Henrietta Boggs, so she is also niece of former president José María Figueres.

She studied at the French Lycée until her family moved to Mexico for her father's work with the United Nations. After two years in Mexico and the United States, Jiménez studied at Lincoln College. In 1988, her father was appointed ambassador to the United States and the family moved to Maryland, where she studied at a public school.

Jiménez returned to Costa Rica in 1990 and graduated with a law degree from the University of Costa Rica in 1997.

== Career ==
After graduating, Jiménez worked as an advisor to first vice president Rodrigo Oreamuno Blanco. She got a master's degree in international law in 1999 at the Georgetown University in the United States through a Fulbright Program and in 1998 moved to France to work for a law firm specializing in international arbitration.

In 2011, she founded DJ Arbitraje, a law firm specializing in international arbitration, in Escazú, Chile, and has also worked on the arbitration team of the International Chamber of Commerce in Paris between 2000 and 2004 and in Santiago de Chile between 2004 and 2007. She worked as a lawyer in Chile until 2013.

The family returned to Costa Rica in 2013, where she worked as an advisor to Finance Minister Edgar Ayales Esna on congressional matters until 2014 and joined briefly the National Liberation Party. In 2014 Jiménez was advisor at the Legislative Assembly.

She is a founding member of the Latin American Arbitration Group of the International Chamber of Commerce (ICC), the International Arbitration Institute, and the Latin American Arbitration Association, and has been professor at Lead University in Costa Rica, the University of Chile, and the Heidel Institute.

=== Minister of Foreign Trade (2018–2020) ===
It was announced in April 2018 that Jiménez would be appointed as the new Minister of Foreign Trade. She was sworn in on 3 July 2018 by president Carlos Alvarado Quesada, and the following day, she stated in a press release that her main objective was to complete Costa Rica's accession process to the OECD.

In March 2019 she signed a Free Trade Agreement with South Korea. In May 2020, amid the COVID-19 pandemic in Costa Rica, Jiménez restricted the entry of foreign freight carriers, measures that were relaxed a few days later after negotiations with the other border countries.

During her tenure, Jiménez led the final negotiations that allowed Costa Rica to join the OECD. She resigned on 7 August 2020 due to disagreements with the Ministry of Foreign Affairs.

In 2021, Jiménez criticized Alvarado's rejection of the country's entry into the Pacific Alliance, stating that it meant Costa Rica would close itself off to negotiations with countries such as Japan and to greater foreign investment, and sends a bad signal as a country.

Jiménez is member of the International Council of Arbitration for Sport.

She became the first Latin American woman to become vice president of the International Council for Commercial Arbitration on 1 April 2025.

== Personal life ==
She married Spanish businessman Roberto Álvarez in France in 2003, with whom she has two children. She is a fan of cinema, dance, reading and sports.

== Publications ==
- Jiménez Figueres, Dyalá., and Karina Cherro. “Investment Arbitration in Costa Rica.” Journal of International Arbitration, 2012.
- Jiménez Figueres, Dyalá. “Multi-Tiered Dispute Resolution Clauses in ICC Arbitration.” The ICC International Court of Arbitration Bulletin, 2003.
- Figueres, Dyalá Jiménez. “La Madurez Del Arbitraje Comercial Internacional: De Laudos Extranjeros Y Laudos Internacionales.” Revista Brasileira de Arbitragem, vol. 2, no. Issue 5, 2005, pp. 129–43
- Figueres, Dyalá Jiménez. “Amicable Means to Resolve Disputes: How the ICC ADR Rules Work.” Journal of International Arbitration, vol. 21, no. Issue 1, 2004, pp. 91–101
