= Public defender (disambiguation) =

A public defender is a lawyer appointed to represent people who otherwise cannot reasonably afford to hire a lawyer to defend themselves in a trial.

(The) Public Defender may also refer to:

- Public Defender (1917 film), a silent film drama
- Public Defender (2024 film), a documentary film
- The Public Defender (film), a 1931 American pre-Code crime film
- The Public Defender (TV series), an American legal drama television series
