= The People's Recorder =

Podcast about American history, culture and literature

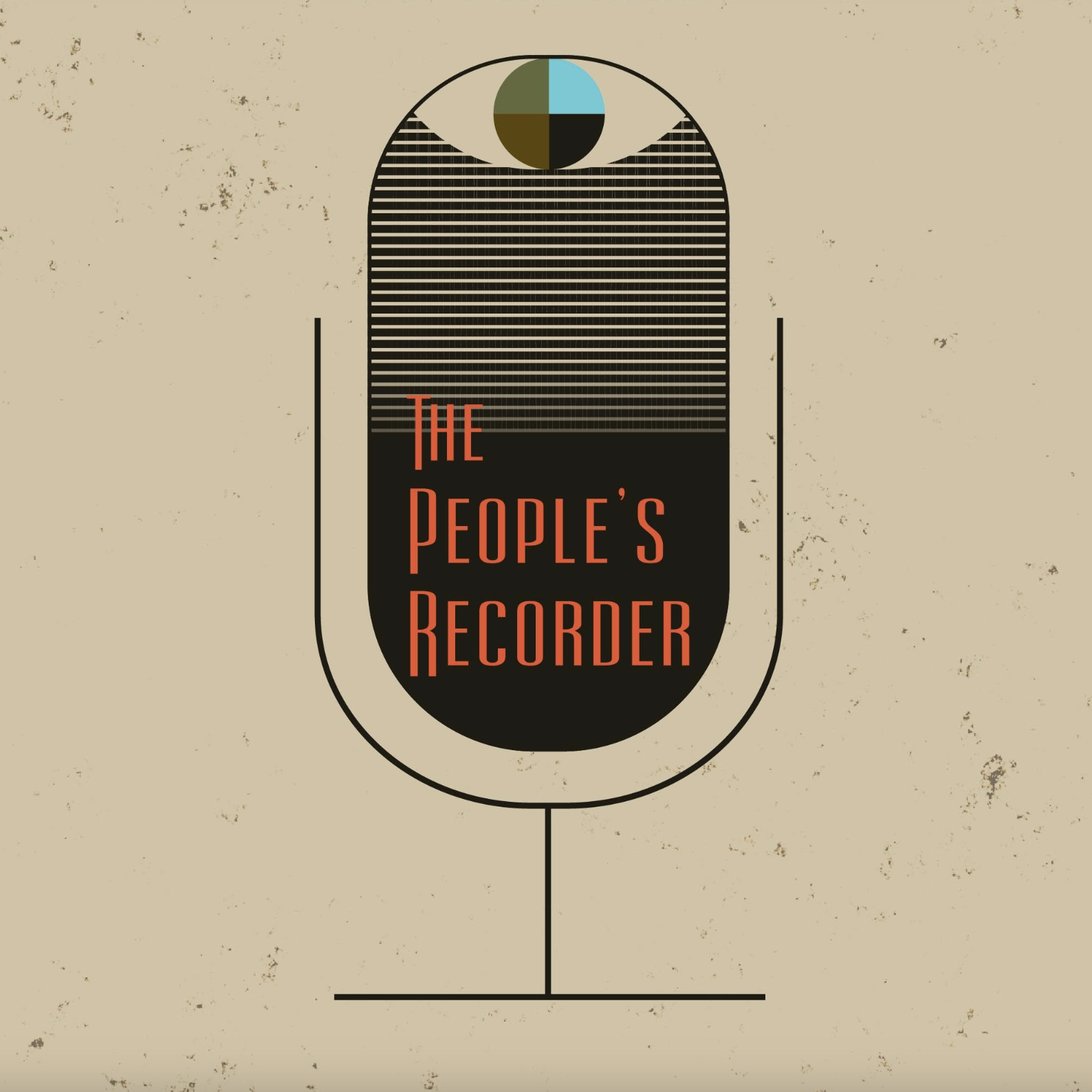
- Genre: History; Culture; Literature
- Language: American English

Creative team
- Written by: David Taylor
- Directed by: Andrea Kalin

Cast and voices
- Hosted by: Chris Haley

Production
- Length: 30–60 Minutes

Publication
- No. of seasons: 1
- No. of episodes: 10
- Original release: February 22, 2024
- Provider: Spark Media
- Updates: Monthly

Related
- Website: peoplesrecorder.info

The People's Recorder is a podcast about the Federal Writers' Project, and the ways that the American Guide Series reflects the modern day United States. The podcast is produced by Spark Media and is hosted by author and historian Chris Haley.

== About ==
Inspired by the award-winning documentary, Soul of a People, the podcast explores the work of the Federal Writers' Project, a United States government agency within the Works Progress Administration during the Great Depression. The project hired out of work writers with the goal of publishing a series of travel guides.

The first season of The People's Recorder includes ten episodes. The podcast was produced with funding from the National Endowment for the Humanities and the state humanities councils of Florida, Virginia, Wisconsin, California, and Nebraska.

== Reception ==
In a 2025 review of The People's Recorder, Destry Maria Sibley writes for The Oral History Review, "If the work of the FWP was to make visible American histories and life stories that would otherwise be overlooked, The People’s Recorder successfully positions itself within this genealogy..."

The People's Recorder was nominated for Best Indie Podcast at the 2025 Ambies and received a 2025 Signal Award.
