= David A. Taylor =

American author and filmmaker

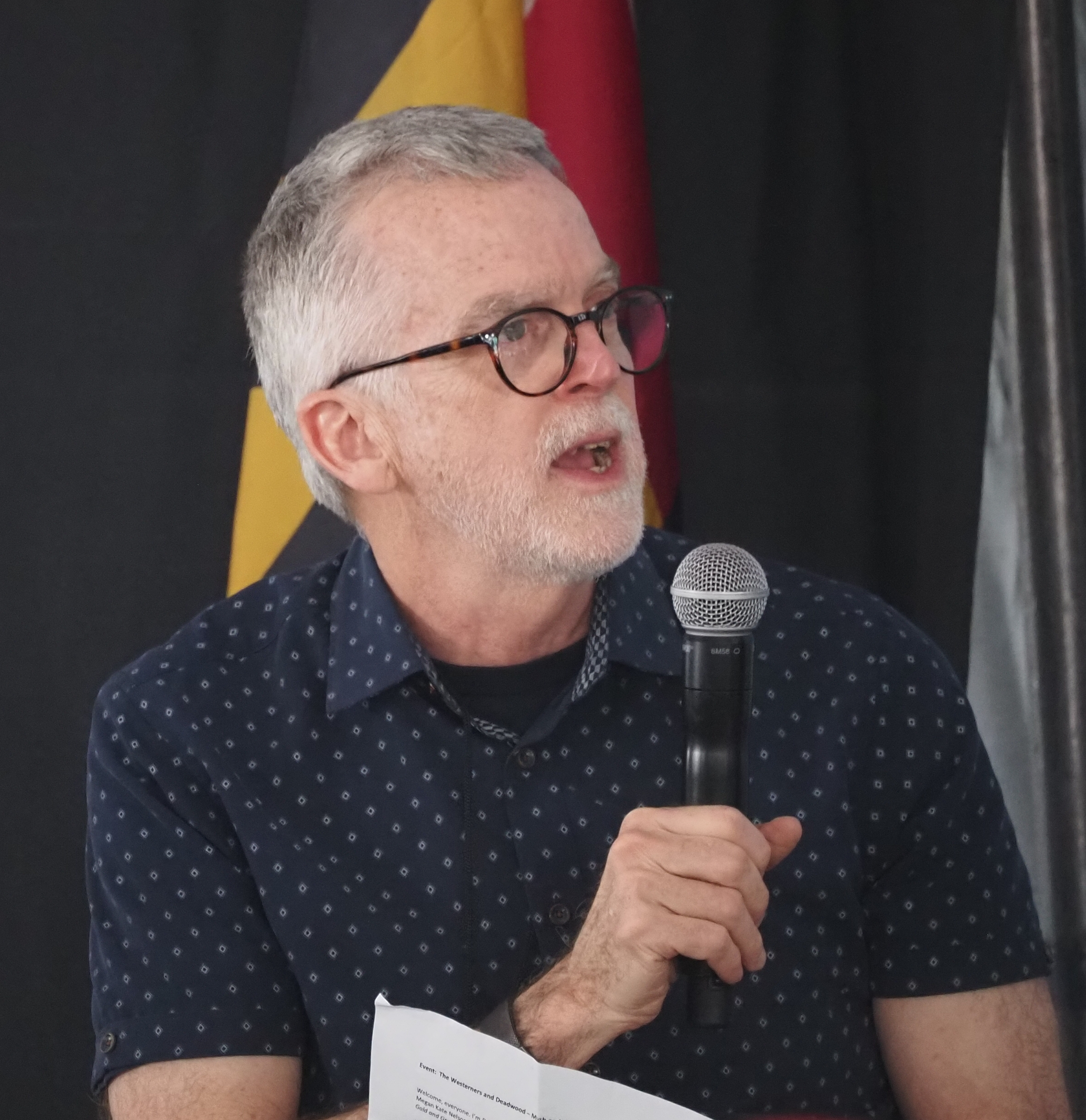
- Taylor at the 2026 Gaithersburg Book Festival
- Born: 1960 or 1961 (age 64–65); Alexandria, Virginia, U.S.
- Education: Davidson College (B.A., English, cum laude)
- Occupations: Author, filmmaker
- Known for: Ginseng, the Divine Root (2006); Soul of a People: The WPA Writers' Project Uncovers Depression America (2009); The War of 1812 and the Rise of the U.S. Navy (2012, with Mark Jenkins); Cork Wars: Intrigue and Industry in World War II (2018)
- Awards: Independent Publisher Book Award for History
- Website: www.davidataylor.org

David A. Taylor (born 1960 or 1961) is an American author and filmmaker on topics in history and science. His books include Ginseng, the Divine Root and Soul of a People: The WPA Writers' Project Uncovers Depression America, which the Pittsburgh Post-Gazette ranked among the Best Books of 2009.

Taylor has written articles for The Washington Post, Smithsonian, Science, Microbe, National Geographic, and Scientific American. He has written scripts for National Geographic Channel, PBS, Discovery, and Smithsonian Channels.

== Early life and education ==
David A. Taylor was born in 1960 or 1961 and grew up in Alexandria, Virginia His father, William Taylor, was an army engineer who contracted polio in his twenties in the early 1950s. He returned to work for the government after years of physical therapy. During David's early childhood, William Taylor worked at NASA on projects to track Soviet space plans, survey the Moon's surface, and helped to design the Lunar Roving Vehicle.

Taylor received a bachelor's degree in English cum laude from Davidson College and an MFA in Creative Writing from Pacific Lutheran University's Rainier Writing Workshop. He is married and lives in Washington, DC.

== Career ==
Taylor's first book, Ginseng, the Divine Root, was published by Algonquin Books in June 2006. The Boston Globe called it a "fantastic" book that shows "what an endlessly surprising place the world is by revealing the drama concentrated in the past and present of one plant." Library Journal dubbed it "a fascinating tour" from "a master storyteller."

Taylor's second nonfiction book, Soul of a People: The WPA Writers’ Project Uncovers Depression America, published by Wiley & Sons in February 2009, was named an Amazon Book of the Month and a finalist in the Library of Virginia Literary Awards. The Pittsburgh Post-Gazette ranked the book among the Best Books of 2009. According to Southern Cultures, the book, about the Federal Writers' Project, introduces important American writers of that period and shows how they "shaped the way Americans tell their histories." NPR featured the book on All Things Considered. In the Washington Independent Review of Books Cathy Alter wrote that Soul of a People was "a humane and seminal accounting of our country," akin to Studs Terkel's Working.

Publishers Weekly called Taylor's 2012 collaboration with Mark Collins Jenkins, an illustrated National Geographic book about the War of 1812, "fascinating" and said the authors avoid cheerleading and instead provide "a captivating story."

Taylor's 2018 book, Cork Wars: Intrigue and Industry in World War II, published by Johns Hopkins University Press, as Grady Harp wrote in the San Francisco Review of Books, "reads like a thriller." Historian Douglas Brinkley called Cork Wars "a marvelous history." In focusing the narrative on three families caught up in World War II when a seemingly innocuous substance, cork, gained strategic value in wartime, Taylor created an "absorbing account," wrote reviewer Brian Crim. The most compelling part, Crim wrote, involved "how families of outsiders--immigrants from Ireland, Italy, Spain, and Eastern Europe--demonstrated unbelievable resilience and ingenuity" in the face of hostility at home and abroad.

Taylor writes articles for Discover, Scientific American and Smithsonian magazines, and teaches in the M.A. in Science Writing program at Johns Hopkins University.

=== Documentaries, television and podcasts ===
In the 1990s, Taylor began writing for television and documentary films. After writing for television series including Great Castles of Europe and the F.B.I. Files, he ventured into long-form documentary, serving as a creative consultant with Spark Media for the 2002 PBS documentary, Partners of the Heart, about racism and a pioneering partnership in medicine.

Taylor was the lead writer and co-producer on the documentary film based on his book, Soul of a People: Writing America’s Story, which was broadcast on Smithsonian Channel in October 2009. Directed by Andrea Kalin and produced by Spark Media, the film garnered a Writers Guild of America Awards nomination for best documentary (non-current affairs), a TIVA gold award for best documentary scriptwriting, and a Cine Best of DC award.

The view of the WPA experience of writers and artists during the Depression in Soul of a People provided a springboard for writers at the start of the 2020 COVID-19 shutdown to consider potential large-scale responses to the economic crisis. David Kipen in the Los Angeles Times called the film "a moving documentary."

Ryan Prior, writing for CNN Arts, cited the writers profiled in Soul of a People—Richard Wright, Zora Neale Hurston, Ralph Ellison and Saul Bellow—and the impact of the Federal Writers' Project on their later careers and on American culture. He quoted Nelson Algren: "Had it not been for the Project, the suicide rate would have been much higher. It gave new life to people who had thought their lives were over."

In the Chicago Tribune, Chris Borrelli pointed out that by the late 1930s about 75,000 Chicagoans were working for the WPA. He quotes Taylor on how that provided a talent incubator that catalyzed Chicago as a cultural driver even after the Depression ended. Unemployment hit Chicago hard, yet with "the range of talent, and because those just out of college who needed jobs were thrown alongside veteran artists out of work, Chicago enormously benefited," Taylor said, and those innovations fueled American culture for decades.

Revisiting that history in another medium, Taylor in 2022 announced work on a podcast titled The People's Recorder, a collaboration with Spark Media. In August 2022, the podcast received a grant from the National Endowment for the Humanities, along with five state humanities grants. The People's Recorder launched in February 2024 with a first season of ten episodes, hosted by writer-archivist Chris Haley.

The podcast shares stories from recent research, showing how WPA writers documented a surprisingly wide range of American life. That includes important foundations for Black history and milestones in local and state histories. A June 2023 symposium at the Library of Congress featured a new generation of researchers and local historians drawn to the Writers' Project experience. In 2025, The People's Recorder was nominated for an Ambie award from the Podcast Academy for Best Indie Podcast and received a Signal Award in the History category.

=== Short fiction ===
Taylor's short story collection, Success: Stories, received the 2008 Washington Writers Publishing House Award for Fiction. StorySouth wrote that "superbly-crafted tales . . . explore the most vital crises of existence, when human emotions—desire and isolation, suspicion and jealousy—boil over, leaving in their wake exquisite failure and a conflict that blooms in complexity every time the reader revisits it." Publishers Weekly praised Taylor's stories for probing the ironies "in the commonly held notion of a successful life." In Washington City Paper, Mark Athitakis wrote that Taylor's skills included "tight, convincing dialogue, and an eye for apt metaphors."

Taylor's stories have appeared in literary journals including Gargoyle, Potomac Review, Jabberwock, Barrelhouse, and Rio Grande Review, and in the anthologies Stress City, This Is What America Looks Like, Eclectica's Best Fiction, and America's Future.

== Awards ==
- Outstanding Feature Story, Large Outlet, SEJ 23rd Annual Awards for Reporting on the Environment, for "Inside the Crime Rings Trafficking Sand," Scientific American
- Independent Publisher Book Award for History (World)
- Writers Guild of America East Screenplay Reading Series
- Career Grant from the National Association of Science Writers
- Virginia Center for the Creative Arts Fellowship
- CASE Media Fellowship
- National Endowment for the Humanities grants
- International Reporting Project Fellowship for reporting on malaria in West Africa
- Soul of a People and Success: Stories were both finalists in the Library of Virginia's Literary Arts Awards

== Selected bibliography ==
- Cork Wars: Intrigue and Industry in World War II. Baltimore: Johns Hopkins University Press, December 2018. (nonfiction)
- Towards the Assessment of Trees Outside Forests. By Hubert de Foresta et al. A Thematic Report prepared in the framework of the Global Forest Resources Assessment 2010. Edited by David Taylor. Rome: FAO, 2013. (scientific report)
- The War of 1812 and the Rise of the U.S. Navy. Mark Jenkins and David Taylor. Washington, DC: National Geographic Books, 2012. (nonfiction)
- Tall Ship Odysseys: Fifty Years of Operation Sail. Boston: Boston Publishing Co., 2010. (nonfiction)
- The Dragon and the Elephant: Understanding the Development of Innovation Capacity in China and India: Summary of a Conference. Merrill, Stephen, Taylor, David A. et al. Washington, DC: National Academies Press, 2010. 64 pages. (scientific report)
- Soul of a People: The WPA Writers’ Project Uncovers Depression America, by David Taylor. New Jersey: Wiley & Sons, 2009. (nonfiction)
- Success: Stories. Fiction. Washington, DC: Washington Writers Publishing House, 2008. (short stories)
- Ginseng, the Divine Root. NY and Chapel Hill: Algonquin Books, 2006. (nonfiction)

== Documentary films ==
- Worlds of Sound: The Ballad of Folkways for Smithsonian Channel's Inside the Music. 52 minutes. Smithsonian ChannelHD. 2009.
- Soul of a People: Writing America’s Story. 93 minutes. NEH-funded program for Smithsonian ChannelHD. 2009.
- Where Life Meets Art. Zora Neale Hurston in Maryland. 5 minutes. Spark Media. 2007.
- Partners of the Heart, for PBS American Experience (creative consultant). 55 minutes. Spark Media. 2002.
- Endangered Animals: Survivors on the Brink. National Geographic. 1997.
