= Karen Olsen Beck =

Danish American-Costa Rican diplomat (1930–2025)

- Beck in 1974

Member of the Legislative Assembly of Costa Rica
- In office May 1, 1990 – April 30, 1994

Ambassador of Costa Rica to Israel
- In office 1982–1984
- President: Luis Alberto Monge

First Lady of Costa Rica
- In role May 8, 1970 – May 8, 1974
- President: José Figueres Ferrer
- Preceded by: Clara Fonseca Guardia
- Succeeded by: Marjorie Elliott Sypher

First Lady of Costa Rica
- In role February 7, 1954 – May 8, 1958
- President: José Figueres Ferrer
- Preceded by: Henrietta Boggs; Vacant (1949–1954)
- Succeeded by: Olga De Benedictis Antonelli

Personal details
- Born: Rita Karen Olsen; January 31, 1930 Copenhagen, Denmark
- Died: September 25, 2025 (aged 95) San José, Costa Rica
- Party: PLN
- Spouse: José Figueres Ferrer (m. 1954; died 1990)
- Children: 4, including José María and Christiana
- Education: Columbia University; University of Copenhagen; University of Mary Washington
- Profession: Diplomat; Politician; Social worker

Rita Karen Olsen Beck (January 31, 1930 – September 25, 2025) was a Danish American-Costa Rican diplomat, politician and social worker. She served as the First Lady of Costa Rica during the governments of her husband José Figueres Ferrer 1954–1958 and 1970–1974, a Legislative Assemblywoman and the Ambassador of Costa Rica to Israel. She was the oldest living past first lady of Costa Rica following the death of Marita Camacho Quirós in 2025.

== Biography ==
Olsen was born Rita Karen Olsen in Copenhagen, Denmark, on January 31, 1930. Her parents, Walter Olsen and Karen Beck Olsen, had emigrated to the United States from Denmark and became naturalized U.S. citizens. She lived in Yorktown Heights, New York.

From an early age she exhibited great interest in social issues. While a student at Mary Washington College (now University of Mary Washington) she was involved in several movements promoting solidarity with, and defense of, the needy. After graduating from Mary Washington College, Olsen enrolled at the University of Copenhagen to study social sciences. She then received a Master of Arts in sociology from Columbia University in New York City.

She married the then-President of Costa Rica, José Figueres Ferrer, on February 7, 1954, becoming the country's First Lady. Olsen was 23 years old at the time of the wedding, while Figueres was 47. The ceremony was performed at the home of Figueres' brother, Antonio Figueres, by Archbishop Ruben Odio Herrera. President Figueres had divorced his first wife, former First Lady Henrietta Boggs, on January 1, 1954.

With Figueres she had four children, including José María Figueres, also president of Costa Rica 1994–1998; and Christiana Figueres, a specialist in environment and climate change, who is the executive secretary of the United Nations Framework Convention on Climate Change.

Olsen died on September 25, 2025, at the age of 95.
