= Prince Among Slaves =

- The Public Broadcasting Service (PBS) film poster
- Directed by: Andrea Kalin, Bill Duke
- Screenplay by: Andrea Kalin, Erik Habecker, Lloyd 'Raki' Jones
- Based on: Based upon the book, Prince Among Slaves, by Terry Alford
- Produced by: Andrea Kalin
- Cinematography: John Rhode
- Music by: Joseph Vitarelli
- Production company: Spark Media
- Release date: 2007
- Running time: 58 Minutes
- Language: English

Prince Among Slaves is a 2007 historical drama directed, written and produced by Andrea Kalin and narrated by Mos Def made for PBS by Unity Productions Foundation. The film, made in association with Spark Media and Duke Media, is based on the story of Abdul Rahman Ibrahima Sori, a prince from Guinea who was made a slave in the United States and freed 40 years later.

== Summary ==
Based on a biography by Northern Virginia Community College history professor Terry Alford, Prince Among Slaves dramatizes Abdul-Rahman's African-Muslim-prince-turned-American-slave drama cycle with historic and scholastic commentary along the way.

The story begins with Prince's capture at the age of 26 during a military campaign against non-Muslims in Guinea in 1788, and follows his sale to slave traders, transport to America on the slave ship Africa to New Orleans, arrival into bondage at Thomas Foster's tobacco plantation in Natchez, Mississippi, then ensuing 40 years of enslavement and his eventual liberation.

The unlikely story of his liberation began with a chance meeting with Dr. John Cox, who Abdul-Rahman's father helped in Africa. Cox offered to buy Abdul-Rahman from Foster, but he refused. Two decades later Cox's son William enlisted the help of local newspaper editor Andrew Marschalk to Abdul-Rahman's cause. Articles written by Marschalk caught the attention of then Secretary of State Henry Clay, who convinced President John Quincy Adams to free Abdul-Rahman. The liberated prince immediately purchased the freedom of his wife Isabella for $200, and remained in America for a year campaigning to free his nine children still enslaved on Foster's cotton plantation. He toured the northern cities, petitioning abolitionist groups and politicians for the money necessary to buy his family's freedom. He succeeded in raising only enough money for two of his children and their families who joined Isabella in Liberia. The prince returned to Africa, but died before reaching his kingdom in Futa Jallon. The film ends with Prince's living descendants from both sides of the Atlantic reunited for the first time at the fateful plantation in Natchez, with family members reacting to the discovery of their shared royal and slave heritage after nearly 200 years of disconnection.

== Background ==
The producers were drawn to the project during the spiritual turmoil that followed the September 11, 2001 attacks. According to Alex Kronemer, one of Unity Productions Foundation's executive producers, the story brought up a question about the plight of slaves completely disconnected from their native cultures. "In times of great tension and stress, people seek out their religious connections. But what was the spiritual life of the enslaved Africans? We don't know much about that."

That Abdul-Rahman had a religion, and was a Muslim, and a prince all at once, upsets many stereotypes, according to Director Andrea Kalin, whose films generally focus on bridging communication gaps between cultures. "Many people don't realize that up to 30 percent of slaves that came to America were Muslim. That didn't last past the first generation, but their customs are still evident in blues and some of the South's food."

"It's a universal story." Kronemer said. "It's paradise lost. We all wonder what would happen if we lost it all. Here's a story about someone who lost an entire empire and emerged intact." At the time of his capture in 1788, Abdul-Rahman commanded an army bigger than George Washington's in a country larger than the 13 original U.S. states.

It was Abdul-Rahman's extraordinary status that makes the story exemplify the ordinary in the experience of slavery, according to Mary McNamara of the Los Angeles Times. "His education and his brief fame make it a bit easier to tell his story, to know the sequence of certain events, the thoughts in his mind. But every one of the 16 million Africans abducted and sold had a similar story. Every African had a family left behind, a job, a past, a world in which he or she belonged. Every slave had to come to their own terms of submission or die."

== Appearances ==
=== Cast ===
- Marcus Mitchell — Abdul Rahman
- Bruce Holmes – Thomas Foster
- John C. Bailey – Andrew Marschalk
- Dawn Ursula – Isabella
- Andrew Honeycutt – Samba
- Wilson White – Dr. John Coates Cox
- Theodore M. Snead – David Walker
- Ian Coblyn – Young Abdul Rahman
- Isaiah Johnson – Middle Passage

=== Dramatic Readings Cast ===
- Robert G. McKay – Abdul Rahman;
- Randahl Lindgren – John Quincy Adams, Henry Clay;
- John C. Bailey – Andrew Marschalk, Major Steve Power;
- Casey Kaleba – Alexander Falconbridge, John Newton;
- Javier Sierra, David E. Elvove, Robin Coblyn, Julius Gwyer – Northern Tour

=== Commentators ===
- Terry Alford
- Kwame Anthony Appiah
- Bebe Moore Campbell
- Sylviane A. Diouf
- David S. Dreyer
- Artemus Gaye
- Michael Gomez
- Adam Hochschild
- Zaid Shakir

== Funding ==
Prince Among Slaves is a presentation of the National Black Programming Consortium. Major funding for Prince Among Slaves was provided by the National Endowment for the Humanities, the Corporation for Public Broadcasting, the El Hibri Charitable Foundation and many individual contributors.

== Awards ==
The film won the Best Documentary Award at the 2007 American Black Film Festival in Los Angeles, as well as multiple others including Gold at the World Media Film Festival, TIVA DC Peer Awards, Cine Golden Eagle, and a Grand Goldie.

== Broadcast ==
With a national broadcast on PBS, the film led off the network's Black History Month's programming in February 2008. Since then it has been re-broadcast on many local PBS affiliates.

== Community ==
Unity Productions Foundation has coordinated screenings in over 50 major U.S. cities in such diverse locations as the Hayti Heritage Center in Durham, North Carolina; the Fellowship Chapel in Detroit, Michigan; the Islamic Inmates Corrections Association of America, Tucson, Arizona; the Natchez Wilkinson Public Library, Natchez, Mississippi; the Rialto Center for the Performing Arts in Atlanta, Georgia; and the National Underground Railroad Freedom Center in Cincinnati, OH.

With support from organizations such as the Urban League, National Black Arts Festival, NAACP Chapters, Howard University, and Americans for Informed Democracy, these screenings brought together civic leaders committed to supporting the arts, civil rights and cultural diversity.

Today the film is used in thousands of communities, schools, universities, religious congregations, and civic organizations throughout the United States to increase Americans' understanding of the cultural legacy of enslaved Africans, Muslims in early America, the Trans-Atlantic slave trade, and American Identity today. Guides to facilitate discussions of the film's themes are available through the Prince Among Slaves project and the 20,000 Dialogues project.

With a second major grant from the National Endowment for the Humanities, the DVD of the film was re-issued in 2011 to include the dialogue guide for communities and lesson plans for teachers to use the film in the classroom, and an educational website about the cultural legacy of enslaved Africans.

== See also ==
- List of films featuring slavery
- List of Islamic films
- Alex Kronemer
- Michael Wolfe
- Andrea Kalin
- Mos Def
