= Public Defender (2024 film) =

2024 American documentary film

- Directed by: Andrea Kalin
- Written by: Andrea Kalin
- Produced by: Andrea Kalin, p.g.a. Ethan Oser
- Starring: Heather Shaner; Annie Howell; Jack Jesse Griffith
- Cinematography: Ethan Oser
- Edited by: Thomas Niles
- Music by: Mike Sayre
- Production company: Spark Media
- Distributed by: The New Yorker
- Release date: May 26, 2024 (Mountainfilm)
- Running time: 51 minutes 40 minutes
- Country: United States
- Language: English

Public Defender is a 2024 documentary film about Washington, D.C., criminal defense attorney Heather Shaner. The documentary follows Shaner's work defending two individuals who participated in the January 6 United States Capitol attack.

Public Defender is a Spark Media film, produced in partnership with Pulitzer Center. The documentary was directed and produced by Andrea Kalin with Emmy-award winning actor Richard Schiff as executive producer.

== Synopsis ==
Heather Shaner is a criminal defense lawyer who has been practicing in Washington, DC for more than 45 years. After a lifetime dedicated to vulnerable clients, Shaner faces an unexpected turn when she is asked to represent people who took part in the January 6th attack on the U.S. Capitol.

Shaner is assigned to represent Jack "Liberty Dragon" Griffith, a social media influencer, and Annie Howell, a single mother and painter. As Shaner gets to know her clients, she discovers how her clients were deceived by misinformation and thought they'd joined a righteous defense of democracy on January 6.

Public Defender explores the impact of disinformation on every-day Americans, and the broader challenge of addressing the divisions that exist in American society.

== Release ==
Public Defender premiered in Telluride, Colorado, at Mountainfilm on May 26, 2024, where it won the Moving Mountains Award for social justice and impact. Following its festival premiere, Public Defender had a limited theatrical run at the Roxie Theater in San Francisco, California and was released by The New Yorker via YouTube.

In addition to its publication by The New Yorker, Public Defender was also broadcast in Israel by yes, in Japan by NHK World-Japan, and by Scripps News in the United States on November 3, 2024 as part of their Emmy-winning documentary series, "In Real Life."

The documentary also had a Washington, DC regional public television broadcast on WETA-TV.

== Reception ==
Following the world premiere at Mountainfilm, Public Defender screened at festivals across the United States, including Indy Shorts presented by Heartland Film Festival, Rhode Island International Film Festival, and Hot Springs Documentary Film Festival. The documentary was also recognized with a Gold Telly Award for Documentary, the Best Life & Liberty Film award at Sidewalk Film Festival in Birmingham, Alabama, and the award best mid-length documentary at Frozen River Film Festival in Winona, Minnesota

Writing for The Ankler, Katey Rich calls Public Defender, "One of the most moving shorts" that she watched in 2024. Giving the documentary 4.5 stars out of 5 for Video Librarian, J. Zimmerman writes that Public Defender is, "an excellent non-fiction examination of the moral and political challenges that face defense lawyers in America."

Prior to the release, the documentary was awarded a Mountainfilm Commitment Grant and was invited to take part in Hot Docs Deal Makers 2023 under the film's working title, A Capitol Case.
