= Caribbean Legion =

1946–1950 Latin American revolutionary organisation

- Legión del Caribe
- Military leader: Juan Rodríguez
- Dates active: 1947–1950
- Active regions: Central America and the Caribbean (Cuba; Costa Rica)
- Ideology: Pro-democratic progressivism
- Size: c. 700
- Wars: Costa Rican Civil War

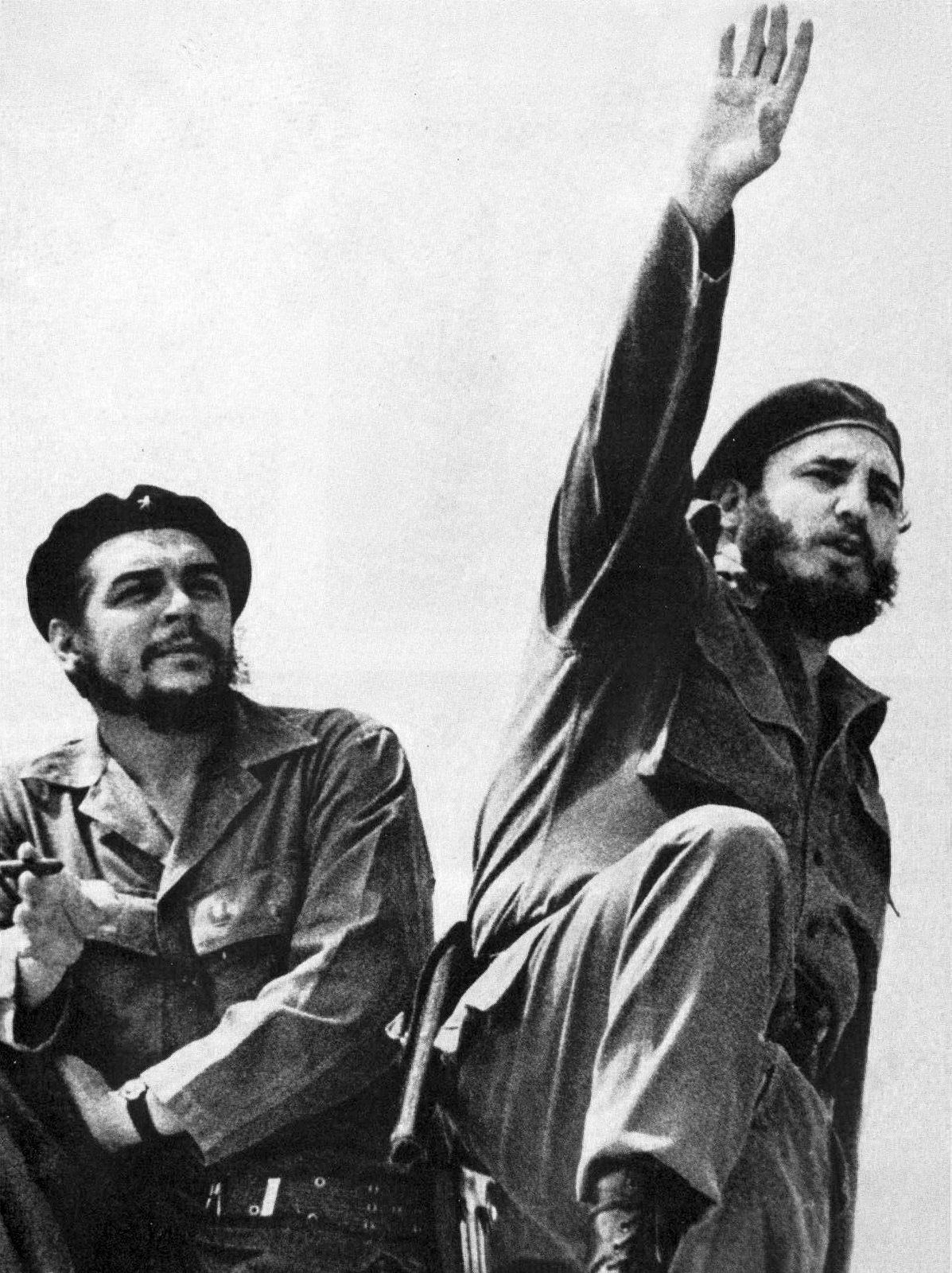
Che Guevara & Fidel Castro.

The Caribbean Legion (Spanish: Legión del Caribe) was an irregular paramilitary group and network of progressive Latin American exiles, mercenaries, and revolutionaries in the 1940s. They aimed to overthrow dictatorships across Central America and replace them with democratic governments.

The organization's leaders and members of the Legion came from most of the countries in Latin America, although the largest number were from the Dominican Republic. The stated targets of the Legion were the dictatorships of Rafael Trujillo in the Dominican Republic and Teodoro Picado in Costa Rica.

The Legion mounted two failed invasions of the Dominican Republic, in 1947 and 1949. It successfully toppled the Costa Rican government in the Costa Rican Civil War in 1948.

== History ==
In the mid-1940s, the emergence of democracy in Cuba, Venezuela, and Guatemala galvanized pro-democracy activists in other countries. In November 1945, when Eduardo Rodríguez Larreta, the foreign minister of Uruguay, proposed a resolution advocating "multilateral collective action" in support of democracy and human rights. The resolution was not supported by most of the hemisphere's governments but emboldened the political rebels. The activities of the loosely knit group that would later be called the Caribbean Legion began in 1946. The dictatorships of Rafael Trujillo in the Dominican Republic and Anastasio Somoza García in Nicaragua were seen as particularly tyrannical and so became targets of the Legion.

=== Cayo Confites Affair ===
In the summer of 1947, a group of about 1,200-armed men (Cubans, Dominicans, etc.) was assembled in Cuba with the covert assistance of Cuban President Ramón Grau San Martin. The military leaders of the group—Dominican Juan Rodríguez (General-in-Chief), Gen. Feliciano Maderne, Lt Col. Rolando Masferrer, Lt Col. Eufemio Fernández, and Lt Col. Jorge Rivas—believed that with their own strength and the assistance of the Dominican underground, they would be able to overthrow the U.S.-backed dictator Rafael Trujillo. The preparations of the force were not kept very secret, and its intent was very public. Fidel Castro was a lieutenant in this affair. In September 1947, the U.S. government pressured Ramón Grau into arresting the entire force, and the invasion never took place. The weapons of the forces were also confiscated. The exiles were set free within a few days. The incident was given the name "Cayo Confites affair," after the area in Cuba from where the invasion was supposed to be launched.

=== Pacto del Caribe ===
After the collapse of the Dominican invasion attempt, the Guatemalan government of Juan José Arévalo became the legion's biggest supporter. Arévalo had previously procured weapons for the exiles by claiming that his purchases were for the Guatemalan military. He convinced Ramón Grau to release the exiles weapons to the Guatemalan government. The exiles began to congregate in Guatemala. In December 1947 Arévalo convinced them to sign the Pacto del Caribe (Caribbean Pact), a document which laid out a unified agenda for the exiles. The document explicitly called for the overthrow of the governments of Costa Rica, Nicaragua, and the Dominican Republic. In addition, it stated that

All groups representing the oppressed peoples of the Caribbean are invited to join this pact, so that they too—with our help—can liberate their own countries

The ultimate aim of the group was described as follows:

We, the undersigned, declare that the immediate re-establishment of the Republic of Central America is necessary for this continent; this principle will be affirmed in the new constitutions of the liberated countries, and each new government will immediately work to implement it with all the resources at its disposal.

The liberated countries pledge to establish a Democratic Alliance of the Caribbean, which will be open to all the democracies of the Caribbean, as well as to El Salvador and Ecuador...

The Democratic Alliance of the Caribbean will constitute an indivisible bloc in all international crises. Its fundamental aims will be: to strengthen democracy in the region; to demand the respect of the international community for each of its members; to liberate the European colonies that still exist in the Caribbean; to promote the creation of the Republic of the Lesser Antilles; to act as one in defense of our common economic, military and political interests.

From 1948 to 1949 the United States repeatedly asked Arévalo to withdraw his support to the Caribbean Legion, fearing that the Legion was supporting communist interests. However, although the Legion was stridently anti-dictatorial, and was opposed to anti-communist regimes, it was also opposed to communism. Historian Piero Gleijeses writes that the Legion would likely have supported the United States against the Soviet Union, and the Pacto del Caribe explicitly stated that the legion would ally itself with the United States "for the common defense."

=== Costa Rican revolution ===
José Figueres Ferrer, a Costa Rican businessman, had been exiled from Costa Rica in 1942 due to his strident criticism of the government. He came into contact with the Caribbean Legion in 1947 following the Cayo Confites affair. Figueres offered Costa Rica as a base to the Legion against the government of Somoza if the Legion would help him overthrow Teodoro Picado. Although the government of Picado was engaged in limited social reform within the country, it did not wish to engage with anti-dictatorial efforts in Central America, and so many of the exiles were opposed to it. Costa Rica was also attractive as a base because it bordered Nicaragua, whereas Guatemala did not.

Arévalo agreed to Figueres' offer and provided the exiles with the confiscated weapons he had received from Cuba. On 1 January 1948 the Costa Rican government annulled a presidential election that had been won by the opposition candidate. This provided the Legion with a justification for an invasion, and the 300-strong Costa Rican army was quickly defeated by the invasion force composed mostly of Nicaraguan exiles, and Figueres was made President until the democratically elected winner of the nullified election was restored.

=== Luperón invasion ===
In 1949, Arévalo supported another invasion of the Dominican Republic, this time by air. Sixty Dominican exiles were to take part. The invasion force was trained at Guatemalan military facilities, and Arévalo persuaded the Mexican government to allow the invasion planes to refuel there. However, due to poor coordination and poor weather, only 15 men of the invasion force landed in the Dominican Republic at the town of Luperón, where they were quickly captured or killed. The trial of those who were captured was used by the Trujillo government to express its support for non-interventionism and to condemn the Guatemalan government as a puppet of the Soviet Union. The United States also strongly criticised the Legion following the capture of the fighters. The failure of the invasion led to the collapse of the Legion, and it never fought another battle.

== Membership and organization ==
The Caribbean Legion never had a formal structure. The name was coined by journalists in the United States in 1947. Although it had members from every country in Hispanic Latin America, the greatest number came from the Dominican Republic. Many of the exiles were war veterans; many of the Cubans and Dominicans had volunteered in the United States army during World War II, while others had fought in the Spanish Republican Army. There were also some pilots who had been members of the U.S. Air Force.

The funding and weapons of the Caribbean Legion came from many different sources. A number of weapons dealers had stock left over from World War II that they were willing to sell to the Legion. The Legion also received support at various times from the governments of Cuba and Guatemala, as well as from the Costa Rican government of José Figueres Ferrer after it came to power in 1948. The biggest source of funding for the legion was Juan Rodriguez Garcia, a wealthy Dominican rancher who fled the Dominican Republic in January 1946.

A secondary member of the Caribbean Legion was Fidel Castro, who participated in the Cayo Confites affair as a 21-year-old. He was captured with the rest of the invasion force, but escaped by allegedly jumping off the Cuban Navy vessel he was held on and swimming to shore.
