= Henrietta Boggs =

American author (1918–2020)

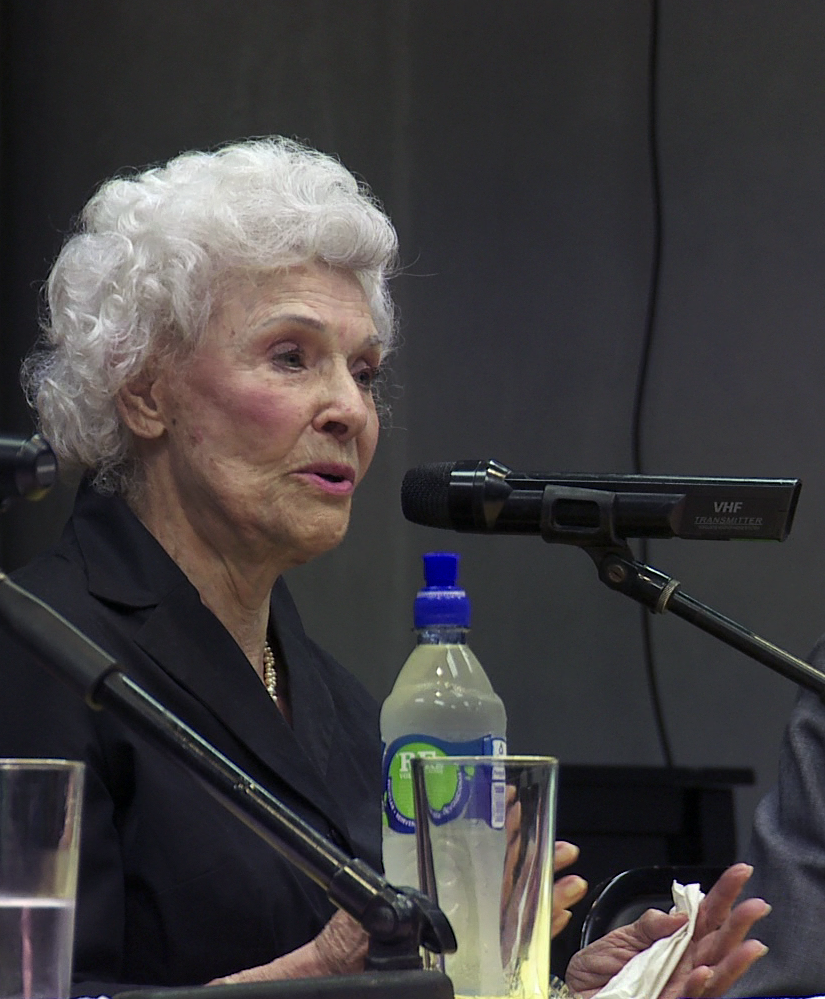
- Henrietta Boggs speaking at a panel discussion in 2014

First Lady of Costa Rica
- In office 8 November 1953 – 1 January 1954
- President: José Figueres Ferrer
- Preceded by: Vacant
- Succeeded by: Karen Olsen Beck
- In office 8 May 1948 – 8 November 1949
- Preceded by: Etelvina Ramírez Montiel
- Succeeded by: Vacant

Personal details
- Born: 6 May 1918 Spartanburg, South Carolina, U.S.
- Died: 9 September 2020 (aged 102) Montgomery, Alabama
- Spouse(s): José Figueres Ferrer (m. 1941; div. 1954) Hugh MacGuire
- Children: 2
- Relatives: Dyalá Jiménez Figueres (granddaughter)

Henrietta Longstreet Boggs (6 May 1918 – 9 September 2020) was an American author, journalist, and activist. She served as First Lady of Costa Rica from 1948 to 1949 in the years immediately following the Costa Rican Civil War. She turned 100 in May 2018.

== Biography ==
Boggs was born in Spartanburg, South Carolina. She was the daughter of Mary Esther Long and Ralph Emerson Boggs, a Presbyterian elder. In 1923, her family moved to Birmingham, Alabama, where her father started a construction business.

After completing high school, Boggs attended Birmingham–Southern College, where she studied English and was a reporter for the student newspaper. While on a summer vacation, Boggs went to visit her aunt and uncle, who had retired in Costa Rica. While there she met and would later marry José Figueres Ferrer.

Figueres would go on to lead the opposition forces in the 1948 Costa Rican Civil War. Therein he led a successful democratic revolution against the government, abolished the army, and catapulted Boggs to the role of first lady. From that vantage point, she successfully pushed for giving Costa Rican women the right to vote. Over time, Boggs realized that marriage and life in politics were incompatible, given her independent spirit in what was still very much a patriarchal society. Boggs divorced Figueres in 1954, and she took their children to New York City, where she worked for Costa Rica's delegation to the United Nations while pursuing her lifelong passion of writing.

Her return to Alabama in 1969 came with a second marriage to Dr. Hugh MacGuire and her co-founding of River Region Living, the city magazine that she would later sell, but for which she still wrote, up to the time of her death.

Boggs was born during the influenza pandemic of 1918 and died from COVID-19 at her home in Montgomery, Alabama, on September 9, 2020, at the age of 102, during the COVID-19 pandemic in Alabama.

== Documentary film ==
Her 1992 memoir of her years in Costa Rica, Married to a Legend: My Life with Don Pepe, is the subject of the documentary First Lady of the Revolution. The film was produced by Spark Media, a documentary film company headquartered in Washington, D.C.
