= N.E.D. =

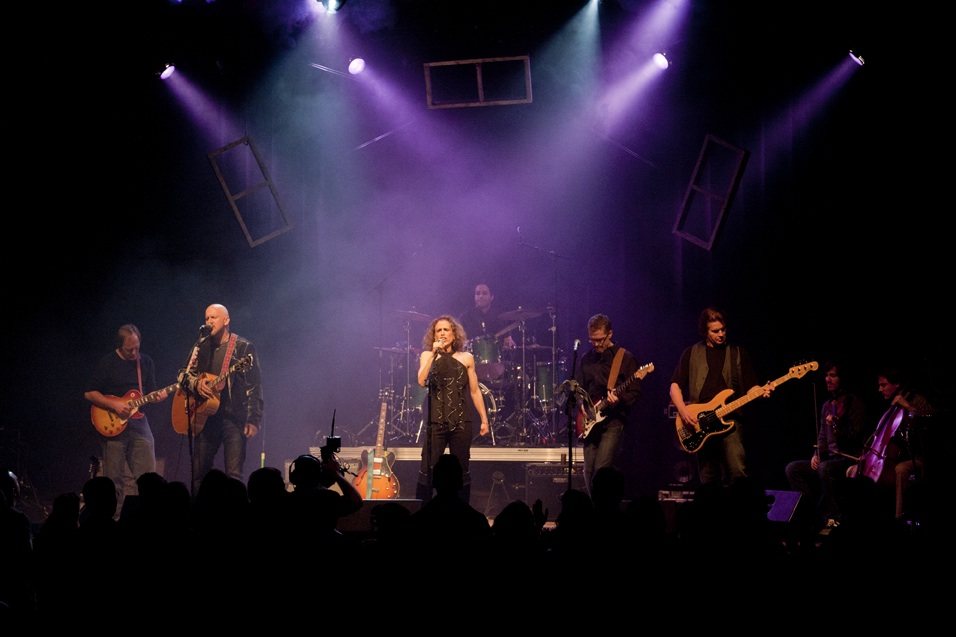
- N.E.D. performing at the Aladdin Theater, 2011

Background information
- Also known as: No Evidence of Disease
- Genre: Alternative rock
- Years active: 2008–present
- Label: Motéma Music
- Members: John Bogess; Nimesh Nagarsheth; William Winter; Bob Burger; Gizelka David-West
- Past members: Joanie M. Hope; William "Rusty" Robinson; John Soper
- Website: www.nedtheband.com

N.E.D. (No Evidence of Disease) is an alternative/folk rock band whose members are medical doctors, mostly gynecologists and gynecologic oncologists. Their members are John Bogess, M.D. on lead vocals, guitar, and harmonica; Nimesh Nagarsheth, M.D. on drums and percussion; Robert "Bob" Burger, M.D. on bass, Gizelka David-West, M.D. on vocals; and William Winter, M.D. on guitar and backing vocals. They released their self-titled debut on Motéma Music in 2009, followed by a second album in 2010 titled 6 Degrees. Their songs focus on emotional content and make no explicit references to cancer.

The band has been reported on by The New York Times, USA Today, The Washington Post, Forbes, NorthJersey.com, and KGW. The band has also been profiled by Lifetime Television and thinkMTV.com. N.E.D. was the subject of a 2013 documentary, No Evidence of Disease, produced by Spark Media.

== History ==
The band formed to play at the annual medical conference of the Ovarian Cancer National Alliance in 2008 and decided that it should be more than just a side project. Their musical style is influenced by U2, Alison Krauss and Union Station, Foo Fighters, Rush, Weezer, and Natalie Merchant.

One of the goals of the band is to increase awareness and education about women's cancers. "GYN cancers are not things people talk about in our culture, and they’re woefully underfunded and misunderstood", John Boggess commented against The Washington Post. "We really believe that we’re starting a conversation. Because there are worse things than getting cancer, and that’s feeling isolated and without help and understanding." Their song lyrics deal with issues of hope and survival, as well as partying and relationships. The band members have the case studies that show that music therapy is beneficial to the healing of cancer patients, and that is the band's mission.

== Documentary ==
A 2013 documentary about the band, also titled No Evidence of Disease, was directed by Andrea Kalin. The film is about the life of the band as well as their patients, their families, and cancer awareness advocates.

== Education and Advocacy ==
N.E.D. is an official part of Marjorie J. Johnson Uterine Cancer Education Fund, a Portland, Oregon based charity named after a musician who died of uterine cancer.

In 2010, Music and Cancer: A Prescription for Healing by Nimesh Nagarsheth was released by Jones & Bartlett Learning. The book quotes his and his bandmates' songs. Dr. Nagarsheth also gave a talk at 92YTribeca about the topic.
