= Red Lines =

- Release Poster for Red Lines
- Directed by: Andrea Kalin and Oliver Lukacs
- Written by: Andrea Kalin
- Produced by: Andrea Kalin
- Starring: Mouaz Moustafa; Razan Shalab Al-Sham; Abu Jaffar; Abu Abdulrahman Al-Soory; Abu Yahia; May Aljblawieah; Jamil Saib; Noura al-Amir; Samer al-Hilal; Assia Shihab; Moaz al-Khatib; Senator John McCain
- Edited by: Oliver Lukacs
- Music by: Armand Amar, and Syrian composers, musicians, and vocalists who wish to remain anonymous due to security concerns.
- Distributed by: FilmBuff
- Release date: April 29, 2014 (Hot Docs)
- Running time: 99 minutes
- Country: United States
- Language: English

Red Lines is a documentary film produced by Spark Media in 2014. It depicts the ongoing civil war in Syria and the efforts of activists Mouaz Moustafa and Razan Shalab-al-Sham to raise international support for the revolution and to promote democracy in the Middle East.

== Synopsis ==
In 2011, protests against Syrian president Bashar al-Assad turned into a violent conflict between the Syrian government and revolutionaries. As the revolution continues, wealthy Syrian socialite-turned-activist Razan teams up with Syrian-American lobbyist Mouaz to forge a link between the Free Syrian Army, the Syrian Emergency Task Force, and the West. However, their goal of a free and democratic Syria is put under strain as the revolution in Syria turns from bad to worse, and Western governments prove reluctant to get involved, despite the growing humanitarian crisis.

== Release ==
Red Lines debuted in Toronto, Canada at the Hot Docs film festival in April 2014, where it was named in the festival's Top 20 Audience Picks. The film was later acquired by distribution company FilmBuff and released through Video On Demand in July 2014. The film broadcast on Free Speech TV. The original soundtrack was released through CD Baby.

== Reception ==
Following its premiere at Hot Docs 2014, Bob Turnball of "Eternal Sunshine of the Logical Mind" deemed Red Lines as "an early candidate for the most moving film of the festival." Red Lines was also acclaimed to be "one of the most inspiring films this year" by Myrocia Watamaniuk, International Programmer for Hot Docs. Sam Cooper of Pretty Clever Films noted that Red Lines was, "easily…one of the most important films at this year's Hot Docs." We Got This Covered describes the film as "eye opening" and "will have you on the edge of your seat." Red Lines was the winner of Best Documentary Feature at Woodstock Film Festival in 2014, which was also the films United States premiere. Red Lines also received the Gold TIVA-DC Award, a Gold Pixie Award for the animated closing credits, the Tiburon International Film Festival Humanitarian Award, three IndieFEST awards including the Humanitarian Award and the Award of Excellence, the Global Film Humanitarian Award, and most recently the Ramdam Film Festival Most Disturbing Film Award. The UK premiere took place September 25 at the Rich Mix Cultural Foundation.
