= José María Figueres =

President of Costa Rica from 1994 to 1998

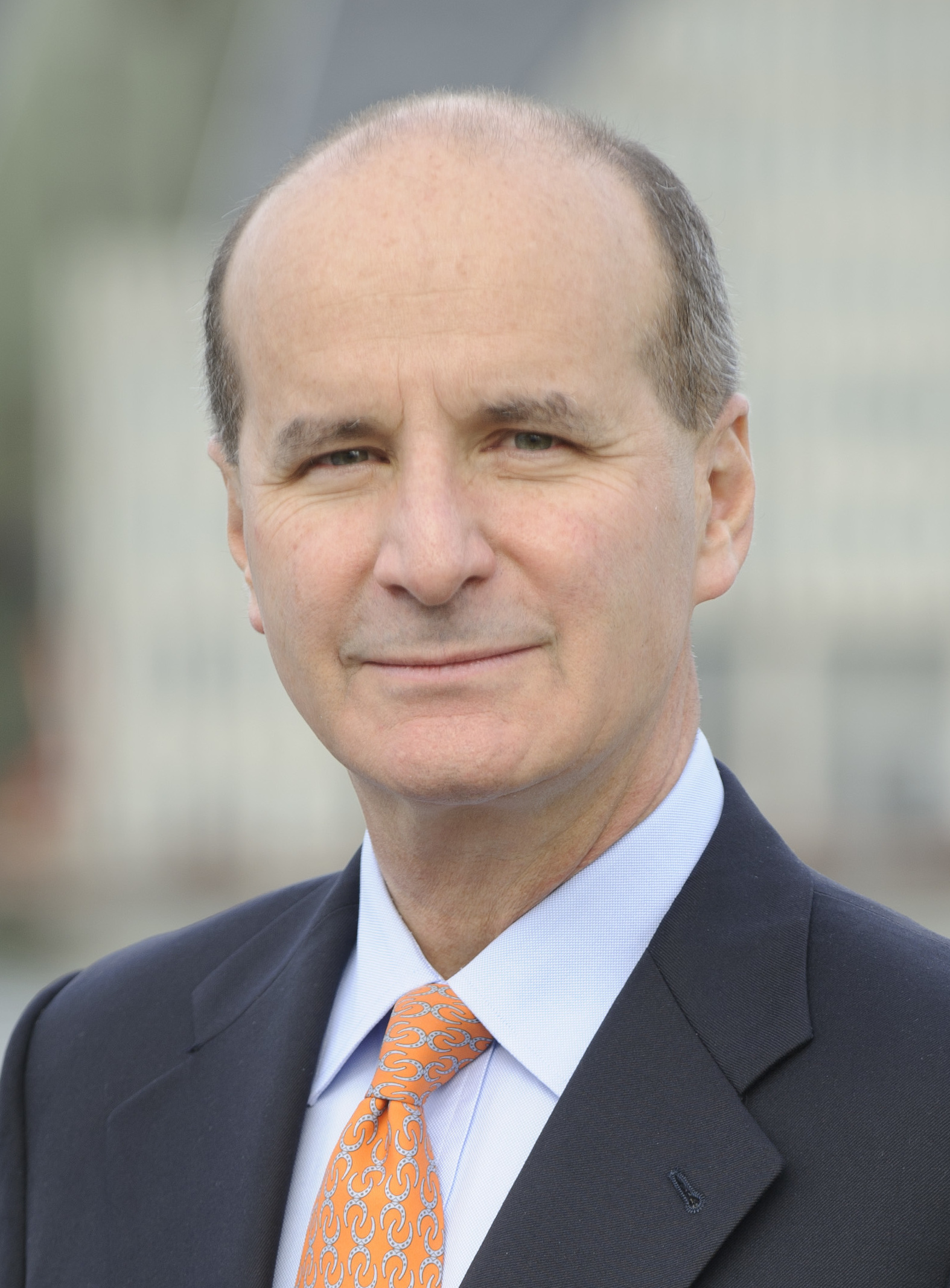
- Figueres in 2012

42nd President of Costa Rica
- In office 8 May 1994 – 8 May 1998
- Vice President: Rodrigo Oreamuno Blanco; Rebeca Grynspan
- Preceded by: Rafael Ángel Calderón Fournier
- Succeeded by: Miguel Ángel Rodríguez

CEO and Director of the World Economic Forum
- In office 2000–2004

Minister of Agriculture
- In office 1989–1990
- President: Óscar Arias Sánchez
- Preceded by: Antonio Álvarez Desanti
- Succeeded by: Juan Rafael Lizano Sáenz

Minister of Foreign Trade
- In office 1986–1988
- President: Óscar Arias Sánchez
- Preceded by: None
- Succeeded by: Luis Diego Escalante Vargas

Personal details
- Born: 24 December 1954 (age 71) San José, Costa Rica
- Party: National Liberation
- Spouse(s): Josette Altmann Borbón (( m. 1978; div. 2000)) Cinthya Geovanna Berrocal Quirós ( m. 2017)
- Children: 2
- Parent(s): José Figueres Ferrer; Karen Olsen Beck
- Relatives: Dyalá Jiménez Figueres (niece)
- Education: United States Military Academy (BS); Harvard University (MPA)
- Profession: Businessman and politician
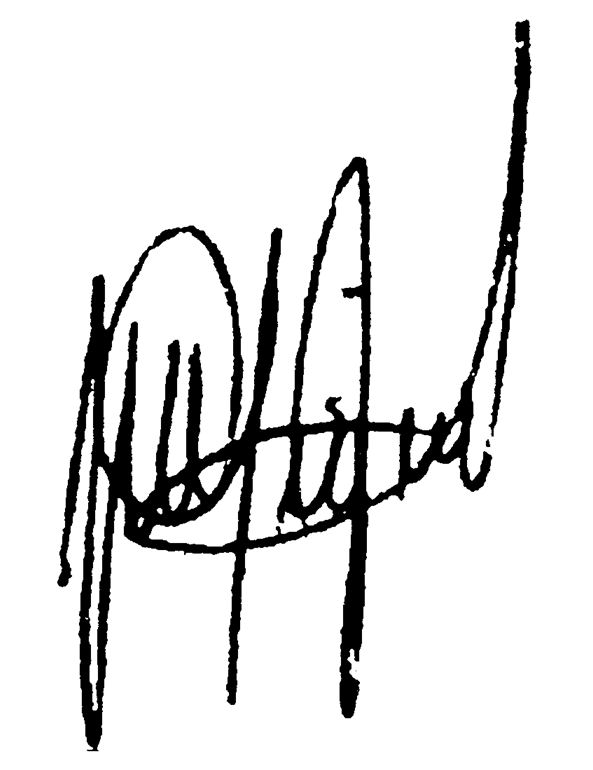
- Signature

José María Figueres Olsen (born 24 December 1954) is a Costa Rican businessman and politician, who served as President of Costa Rica from 1994 to 1998. He also ran for president in the 2022 presidential election but was defeated by Rodrigo Chaves.

Figueres started his career as an engineer working in agribusiness. After a decade, he entered public service as Minister of Foreign Trade and then Minister of Agriculture. In 1994, he was elected President of Costa Rica, as the nation's youngest elected president of the 20th century (Alfredo Gonzalez Flores became president in 1914 at the age of 36, however he was not elected directly, as he was appointed by the National Assembly). He left the presidency of Costa Rica in 1998, since then he has been involved in global issues such as climate change, sustainable development, and technology.

In 2000, Figueres joined the World Economic Forum in Switzerland. In 2004, he resigned over the undeclared receipt of more than 900,000 US dollars in consultancy fees from the French telecommunications firm Alcatel. Later, he worked with Concordia 21 in Madrid. Since 2010, he has been Chairman of the Carbon War Room, an independent non-profit organization focused on the global transition to a low-carbon economy. On 27 March 2012, Sir Richard Branson announced that he was appointed as the new President of the Carbon War Room.

== Biography ==
José María Figueres is the son of José Figueres Ferrer (known as Don Pepe), who was a three-time President of Costa Rica. His mother, Karen Olsen Beck, an American social worker born to Danish immigrant parents, later adopted Costa Rican nationality. After serving as First Lady, she was appointed Ambassador to Israel in 1982. In 1990, she was elected Member of Congress for the 1990–1994 legislature.

Figueres grew up in La Lucha, a farm community his father Don Pepe founded in 1928. There José María attended the public school Cecilia Orlich Figueres, before going on to study at the Colegio Humboldt and later at the Lincoln High School, both in San José.

Figueres has three younger siblings, Christiana Figueres, Mariano and Kirsten. Christiana Figueres was Executive Director of the UNFCCC, responsible for international climate change negotiations. From the first marriage of his father, Figueres has an older brother, Marti, and a sister, Muni. Muni Figueres has held various public positions, and since 2010 she has served as the Costa Rican Ambassador to the United States.

José María has two children from his first marriage to former First Lady Josette Altmann Borbón, José María and Eugenia. The marriage between Figueres and Altmann ended in divorce. He is currently married to Cinthya Berrocal Quirós.

== Education ==
Figueres completed his undergraduate studies at the United States Military Academy (West Point), where he graduated in the Class of 1979 with a major in Engineering. While attending West Point, he attended and completed the U.S. Army's Ranger Training Course in 1975. He was awarded the Army Ranger tab and was the class Distinguished Honor Graduate.

Later, he continued his academic studies at the John F. Kennedy School of Government at Harvard University, graduating in 1991 with a master's degree in Public Administration. During his studies at Harvard, Figueres also attended courses at Harvard Business School and Harvard Law School.

== Business career ==
Upon returning to Costa Rica after concluding his studies at West Point, he joined and later led the restructuring process of the deeply indebted family business, Sociedad Agroindustrial San Cristobal (SAISC). Figueres helped return the business to profitability by disposing of non-productive assets, reducing leverage, improving the efficiency of many industrial processes, and focusing on expanding exports.

Years later, in 1990, Figueres co-founded Energía Global Inc. a renewable energy company with operations in Costa Rica, Guatemala, and Chile. The business was later sold and today it continues to operate as a subsidiary of ENEL.

In 1999, Figueres joined the Board of Directors of Terremark Worldwide Inc, on which he served for five years. He then continued to be closely associated with the company in its international expansion projects. Terremark is involved in transforming and securing enterprise-class IT on a global scale, providing industry managed services, cloud computing, colocation and web hosting solutions for enterprise IT infrastructures from their data centers. In 2011, Terremark was acquired by Verizon.

In 2005, Figueres undertook a one-year assignment as Managing Director of Talal Abu-Ghazaleh Organization, responsible for refocusing global consulting within the group. This group is the largest Arab group of professional services firms, headquartered in Amman, Jordan, with over 73 offices in 23 countries. From 2006 to 2009, Figueres served on the International Advisory Board of Abraaj Capital, the largest Middle East Private Equity firm with over $6 billion of assets under management. In 2009, he joined the Advisory Board of Grupo Arcano, an independent financial services firm based in Madrid, Spain.

In 2010, Figueres joined IJ Partners in Geneva, Switzerland, as a Managing Partner. IJ Partners was founded in 2009 during the global economic crisis, to provide financial services to private individuals and family offices investing exclusively in tangible assets.

Figueres served on the board of the Rocky Mountain Institute, including as chairman until 2017.

== Political career ==
In 1986 Nobel Peace Prize Laurate and President Óscar Arias (1986–1990), appointed Figueres to overhaul the ailing National Railway System, INCOFER. He was then appointed Minister in the Arias government, first of Foreign Trade and later of Agriculture. Upon the completion of the governmental period Figueres continued his academic studies at the John F. Kennedy School of Government at Harvard University, graduating in 1991 with a master's degree in Public Administration.

Following his graduate studies at Harvard, Figueres returned to Costa Rica and declared his intention to seek the nomination of the political party he belonged to, the National Liberation Party. After a heated and much-disputed primary election process involving five candidates, Figueres won the party's nomination in 1993 and went on to the national election that he won in February 1994. José María Figueres Olsen was elected President of Costa Rica for four years at the age of 39, the nation's youngest elected president in the 20th century (Alfredo González Flores took office in 1914 at the age of 36. However he was not elected by popular vote but rather appointed by Congress.)

== Presidency (1994–1998) ==
According to Leonardo Garnier, minister of Planning and Economic Policy during the Figueres' administration, the latter promoted Sustainable Development as the integrating architecture of governmental action. This program was anchored on three pillars: Firstly, to transform the Costa Rican economy towards one of higher productivity, with special emphasis on technology. Secondly, for the Costa Rican society to express greater solidarity by opening opportunities of wellbeing for all. Thirdly, for society to develop itself in harmony with nature (from the book "Gobernando en Tiempos de Cambio: Administración Figueres Olsen", by Leonardo Garnier). The administration is credited with having worked to advance and promote further integration of Costa Rica into the globalised economy.

Figueres reformed and reorganized many public institutions including the closing of some of them, such as Banco Anglo Costarricense (which was plagued with corruption charges) and the National Railway System (INCOFER) which after being re-organized several times was again insolvent. The latter decision was reversed by the following administrations, which actually invested in modernizing the railway, with apparent success. The Figueres Administration contributed to the establishment of Intel Corporation in Costa Rica.

His administration also launched several initiatives to improve national education, including a constitutional reform approved by Congress to dedicate 6% of GDP towards public education; introduced English as a second language in public schools from the first grade up; consolidated the installation of computer labs in high schools.

During his term, government created the EBAIS (Primary Teams of Basic Health Care) as a provider of preventive medicine in the communities, primarily by giving easy access to medical services.

He was also an early leader on climate change, putting in place the first price on carbon in the world in Costa Rica in 1995. In 1994, he proposed to the U.S. Government via the U.S. Department of Energy negotiation of a U.S. - Costa Rica bilateral agreement on climate change. This was the first such agreement in the world, was negotiated in 1994 and signed by President Figueres and U.S. Vice President Al Gore in the Indian Treaty Room of the White House on September 30, 1994. From then on, Costa Rica continued to lead on climate change, engaging other nations across the Americas and under the UN Framework Convention on Climate Change, helping to ensure the success of the Kyoto Protocol and since. Jose Maria's sister, Christiana Figures, played a leading role, advising President Figueres, negotiating the agreement with the U.S., and engaging other nations, eventually becoming Costa Rica's representative in the global climate treaty negotiations, and then the Executive Secretary of the UN Framework Convention on Climate Change.

== Controversies ==
=== Chemise case ===
In 1991, when Figueres was seen as a possible contender for the presidency, brothers David and José Romero published a book accusing Figueres of having participated in the extrajudicial execution of a drug dealer named Jose Joaquin Orozco, known as "Chemise". The basis for this allegation dated back to March 7, 1973. Figueres accused the Romero brothers of libel and in 1993 a court acquitted them while condemning their main source, former drug-enforcement officer Walter Campos. In 1998 another court sentenced the Romero brothers to seven years' imprisonment for making a false accusation, but that sentence was appealed and revoked due to procedural issues. In 2000, two years after Figueres left office, the legal proceeding ended with a settlement between the Romero brothers and Figueres's lawyers.

=== Religion ===
In the middle of Figueres' presidential campaign, anonymous allegations arguing Figueres was not Roman Catholic were widely spread and picked up by the media. Costa Rica's political constitution establishes the Catholic faith as the official State religion. To dispel the strong rumors Monsenor Román Arrieta, Archbishop of San José and President of the Episcopal Conference was obliged to pronounce himself acknowledging that Figueres had been baptized a Roman Catholic.

=== Alcatel ===
In 2004, Costa Rica's Attorney General opened official investigations against two other former presidents, for alleged financial misconduct. Both were placed under arrest. Shortly afterwards local media reports claimed Figueres had also received payments from Alcatel. It was reported that Figueres had earned nearly US$900,000 for three years of consultancy work on telecommunications with Alcatel, initiated two years after his presidency, and while already working in Europe. Figueres disclosed all his financial affairs and requested the Costa Rican Internal Revenue Service to review his tax returns. Following this review, Figueres amended his tax filings to include income earned outside of Costa Rica, which is not subject to Costa Rican tax, and paid 67.2 million Costa Rican colones in taxes. On 5 December 2005 the Internal Revenue Service of Costa Rica notified Figueres of no financial misconduct with resolution number 5452000009594 dated 27 October 2005.

A Congressional Commission took it upon themselves to investigate the allegations. The Commission of Control of Public Revenue and Expenditure (Comisión de Control del Ingreso y el Gasto Público) summoned Figueres. On 6 September 2005, Judge Maria Morales of the First Circuit Court of Costa Rica pronounced a ruling in Figueres' favour, and against the Congressional Commission's procedures. The Commission also failed to register a report on the findings before the Congress, as stipulated in Congressional Procedural Regulations.

In the context of the allegations, Figueres resigned from his role as CEO and executive director of the World Economic Forum in October 2004. Transparency International had highlighted this incident in their Global Corruption Report in 2006. Figueres was never summoned nor charged by the Costa Rican Attorney General's office. On 19 September 2007, the Attorney General formally announced that there were no grounds on which to press any charges against Figueres.

=== Paradise Papers ===
In November 2017 an investigation conducted by the International Consortium of Investigative Journalism cited his name in the list of politicians named in the "Paradise Papers" allegations.

== International awards ==
President Figueres has received international awards for his work and adherence to the tenets of Sustainable Development.

- Kew Gardens Annual Award, 1995
- Botanic Research Institute Texas, 1996
- State Botanical Garden in Missouri, 1996
- First recipient of the Global Prize from the World Bank's Global Environmental Fund for leadership and efforts for the environment, 1998
- Liberty Prize from the Max Schmidheiny Foundation and St. Gallen University in Switzerland, 1998
- Award of the Climate Institute, Washington D.C., 1998
- Order of José Matías Delgado Grand Silver Cross from the Republic of El Salvador, 1999
- Sustainability Award in Switzerland, 2003

== International work ==
Upon leaving government in 1998 President Figueres founded Entebbe (Costa Rican Foundation for Sustainable Development). The foundation started and developed pioneering programs, such as LINCOS (Little Intelligent Communities), APVE (Clean Transport Alternatives) and CENTAIRE (Center for monitoring and evaluation of Air Quality in Central America). A large number of academic, social and communal organizations, as well as private sector partners contributed to the development of these programs. In the same field of deploying technologies to boost development, together with Nicholas Negroponte and Jeffrey Sachs, Figueres founded the "Digital Nations Consortium", a program overseen by the Media Lab at the Massachusetts Institute of Technology (MIT). In 1999 he was called upon by Secretary-General Kofi Annan of the United Nations to chair a working group on Information, Communication, Technology (ICT). He was later elected Chairman of the United Nations Information and Communication Technologies Task Force (ICT).

While leading the ICT Task Force, in mid-2000 Figueres was appointed Managing Director of the World Economic Forum (WEF), and independent international organization dedicated to improving the state of the world by bringing together world leaders to establish alliances that can influence industry, regional and global agendas. Three years later he was appointed the first CEO of the WEF. His responsibilities included coordinating the annual meeting of the forum in Davos, Switzerland, which brought together prominent corporate leaders, heads of State and government, as well as respected personalities from the academic, cultural and religious world.

Figueres resigned from the WEF towards the end of 2004, when consulting work with Alcatel appeared in the international media. Andre Schneider, the WEF's spokesman said that Figueres acknowledged violating the rules of the forum by not declaring that he was being retained as a consultant when he took the post and while he was working at the forum. In his letter of resignation, Figueres apologized to forum founder Klaus Schwab for failing to inform the organization that he had entered the consultancy "many months before joining the Forum."

Since having left government in Costa Rica, Figueres has served on numerous boards. He has served as a director of the World Wildlife Fund, the Botanical Research Institute of Texas, the World Resources Institute (WRI), and the Stockholm Environment Institute. In 2008, Figueres has served as Chairman of the Global Fairness Initiative, taking on the role from its founding chairman, Bill Clinton. He is a board member of FRIDE, the Earth Council Geneva, Population Action International, and is Chairman of the Board of Trustees of DARA. From 2009 until 2011, he served on UN Secretary General Ban Ki-moon's Advisory Group on Climate Change and Energy. In 2010, He joined the Carbon War Room as its first chairman. In the academic field, He also served on the Dean's Alumni Leadership Council at the John F. Kennedy School of Government at Harvard University, and he is a member of Thunderbird School of Global Management, where he often participates in global business events. Figueres is a founding member of the Club de Madrid, an independent non-profit organization with the objective to promote "Democracy that Delivers", composed of more than 100 former Presidents and Prime Ministers from all over the world.

Political offices
New office	Minister of Foreign Trade; 1986–1988	Succeeded by Luis Diego Escalante Vargas
Preceded by Antonio Álvarez Desanti	Minister of Agriculture; 1989–1990	Succeeded by Juan Rafael Lizano Sáenz
Preceded by Rafael Ángel Calderón Fournier	President of Costa Rica; 1994–1998	Succeeded by Miguel Ángel Rodríguez
Party political offices
Preceded by Carlos Manuel Castillo	PLN nominee for President of Costa Rica; 1994	Succeeded by José Miguel Corrales Bolaños
Preceded by Antonio Álvarez Desanti	PLN nominee for President of Costa Rica; 2022	Most recent
