= The Pact (2006 film) =

- Directed by: Andrea Kalin
- Produced by: Andrea Kalin
- Starring: Sampson Davis; George Jenkins; Rameck Hunt
- Cinematography: Bryan Sarkinen
- Edited by: Paula Heredia
- Music by: Marcus Miller
- Production companies: Spark Media; Duke Media
- Distributed by: WGBH Video
- Release dates: March 21, 2006 (CIFF); May 4, 2008 (United States)
- Running time: 84 minutes
- Country: United States
- Language: English

The Pact is a 2006 American documentary film directed and produced by Andrea Kalin, presented by the National Black Programming Consortium, and aired on public television about three childhood friends from New Jersey who make a pact to help keep each other in school, graduate, and all successfully become doctors. The three men now appear as motivational speakers known as The Three Doctors.

== Summary ==
Sampson, George,and Rameck could easily have followed their childhood friends into drug dealing, gangs, and prison. Like their peers, they came from poor, single-parent homes in urban neighborhoods where survival, not scholastic success, was the priority. When the three boys met in a magnet high school in Newark, they recognized each other as kindred sprits that wanted to overcome the incredible odds against them and reach for opportunity.

They made a friendship pact, deciding together to take on the biggest challenge of their lives: attending college and then medical and dental schools. Along the way they made mistakes and faced disappointments, but by working hard, finding the right mentors, separating themselves from negative influences, and supporting each other, they achieved their goals–and more.

Based on the book The Pact, the film chronicles the true life story of Rameck Hunt, Sampson Davis, and George Jenkins, who made a pact in their inner-city high-school in Newark, New Jersey, to find a way to go to college and then medical school. The documentary follows the three doctors as they navigate the minefields of their community work, struggling with exhausting shifts at the hospital, and wrestle with their own painful childhood memories while they spread the word to inspire other inner-city children to stay out of gangs and use education to escape from their urban streets. The narrator of the film, 12-year-old Malique Bazemore, is a Newark resident whom the doctors have taken under their wing. Bazemore lives with his mother and younger sister, who suffers from a rare, deforming neurological disorder. His father abandoned the family when his sister was born. Bazemore accidentally got involved in the film and became one of its central characters.

== Background ==
The three future doctors forged a strong friendship at Newark’s University High School. During junior year, they vowed to change their lives, stay in school and become doctors, hence the making of "the pact" their promise of commitment and support to each other.

According to Davis, "the pact" was an informal agreement the three made as high school juniors when, cutting class one day, they escaped into the school library to avoid being caught by a security guard. A recruiter from the Seton Hall was giving a talk about the university's Pre-Medical/Pre-Dental Plus Program designed for minorities interested in careers in medicine. The three agreed to apply to the program, and to go on to medical school if accepted.

The three overcame staggering statistics. The high school dropout rate in Newark is more than 50 percent. Homicide ranks as the leading cause of death of African American under the age of 24. One out of three blacks is involved with the criminal justice system. All three ultimately graduated from the University of Medicine and Dentistry of New Jersey.

Today, they practice medicine in the same city where they grew up. Davis works in emergency medicine at Newark’s Beth Israel Hospital, the same medical facility where he was born. Hunt is an internist, and Jenkins is a dentist who recently became the director of minority affairs at the University of Medicine and Dentistry of New Jersey.

Andrea Kalin, the film’s director, was attracted to the compelling story of individuals who transcended adverse circumstances. "In our society, we're obsessed with people known for their fame and beauty, not for their characters," says Kalin. "But there are real heroes. These are both men and doctors who can teach us how to face inevitable obstacles with courage."

== Reception ==
Before its airing on public television, many predicted that the film "will do as much, if not more, to influence the aspirations of young men than the rap game, professional sports or street culture ever could."

A number of organizations throughout the country included the documentary as part of their different outreach projects to keep kids out of gangs and in school. In Florida the People For the American Way Foundation used it for their Message Project, a series of education forums for urban youth and young professionals.

Three organizations arranged for different groups of Baltimore boys to view The Pact. Richard Rowe of the African American Male Leadership Institute, David Miller and LaMarr Darnell Shields of the Urban Leadership Institute, and Imam Earl El-Amin, co-host with Rowe of the radio show Dialogue with the African American Male on WEAA thought the message in The Pact was so powerful that the film warranted a third showing in Baltimore. Clarke personally footed the bill for the theater rental and paid for the projectionist.

"Young men," Rowe told the boys after the screening, "don't join a gang. Join a pact."
