= Capri Theatre (Montgomery, Alabama) =

Independent movie theater in Montgomery, Alabama

- Interactive map of Capri Theatre
- Former names: Clover Theatre (1941–1962)
- Address: 1045 East Fairview Avenue; Montgomery, Alabama; United States
- Coordinates: 32°21′09″N 86°17′27″W
- Owner: Capri Community Film Society
- Capacity: 200
- Type: Movie theater

Construction
- Opened: July 1941
- Renovated: 1962, 2014–2016, 2025

Website
- capritheatre.org

The Capri Theatre, originally the Clover Theatre, is an independent movie theater in the Cloverdale neighborhood of Montgomery, Alabama. It is the longest continually operating movie theater in Alabama.

== History ==
The theater opened as the Clover Theatre in July 1941. It was Montgomery's first neighborhood movie theater and was operated by Wilby-Kincey, an affiliate of Paramount Pictures. In December 1962, the building was renovated and renamed the Capri Theatre.

The theater changed ownership multiple times until 1982, when a group of neighborhood residents formed the Capri Community Film Society (CCFS) to save it from closure and took over its lease and operation. In 2010, the building was put up for sale by its landlord, prompting the CCFS to undertake its largest fundraising effort; the society purchased the building in 2013.

In 2014, the theater launched its first capital campaign, "Lighting the Heart of Cloverdale," which raised more than $800,000 for renovations completed ahead of the theater's 75th anniversary. In April 2025, the theater unveiled a new marquee designed in the style of the original 1941 marquee.

In October 2025, the CCFS announced that Martin McCaffery, the theater's director since November 1985, would step down at the end of the year, with his duties divided between Adrian Lee Bush as organization director and Richard Sherman as theatre director. The new leaders took over in early 2026. The theater marked its 85th anniversary in July 2026.

== Programming ==
In addition to first-run independent and foreign films, the theater hosts community events and special screenings.
