= Scattering CJ =

Scattering CJ is a Facebook page started by Hallie Twomey on November 11, 2013, to commemorate her eldest son C.J. Twomey, who died by suicide in 2010. Through the Facebook page, Hallie asked if anyone would be willing to scatter a small amount of C.J.'s cremains in a location of their choosing. Since the founding of the page, C.J.'s ashes have been scattered in over one thousand locations worldwide, including Machu Picchu, the Great Barrier Reef, the Great Wall of China and Mount Kilimanjaro.

== Documentary film ==
In 2019, the Washington, DC–based media production company Spark Media released a documentary titled Scattering CJ about the Facebook page and the Twomey family. The documentary chronicles the Twomey family as they grieve C.J.'s death, experiences and stories of members of the Scattering CJ Facebook page, and the conversation about mental health and suicide prevention that has come from sharing C.J.'s story publicly.

== Reception ==
The documentary Scattering CJ received critical recognition and won several awards, including an Accolade Global Film Competition Award of Excellence and an Impact DOCS Award of Excellence.
