= No Evidence of Disease =

- The release poster for the documentary film 'No Evidence of Disease'.
- Directed by: Andrea Kalin
- Produced by: Andrea Kalin; Karen Simon; Oliver Lukacs
- Starring: Joanie Hope; John Boggess; Nimesh Nagarsheth; William "Rusty" Robinson; John Soper; William Winter
- Cinematography: Bryan Sarkinen; Oliver Lukacs
- Edited by: Amy Young
- Music by: N.E.D.
- Distributed by: Candy Factory Films
- Release date: February 3, 2013
- Running time: 84 minutes
- Country: United States
- Language: English

No Evidence of Disease is a feature-length documentary film about N.E.D., a rock band of six gynecologic oncologists who seek to bring more attention and awareness to women's cancers. The film tells the story of the band members - their personal lives as doctors and musicians - and also takes a look into the world of GYN cancers, where patients struggle to fight the disease and advocacy groups and activists seek to raise awareness and research funds for gynecological cancer research and funding. The documentary is from Spark Media, directed and produced by Andrea Kalin, and distributed by Candy Factory Films.

== Summary ==
The band No Evidence of Disease (N.E.D.) was formed in 2008. The group of six women's cancer surgeons started playing original music to help create awareness and education for women's cancers and have gone on to release two albums. The film chronicles the lives of the band as they seek to raise awareness for gynecologic cancers through their music. The band is composed of six gynecologic cancer surgeons from across the United States: Dr. John Boggess (vocals, guitar), Dr. Joanie Hope (vocals), Dr. Nimesh Nagarsheth (drums, percussion), Dr. William "Rusty" Robinson (bass, harmonica), Dr. John Soper (guitar), and Dr. William Winter (guitar). They hail from all over the United States, including North Carolina, New Jersey, Washington, and Alaska. The film shows the doctors over the course of a year as they balance songwriting, online rehearsals, concerts, and the release of their second album with their work as gynecologic oncologists. Many of their patients are also portrayed in the film.

== Release ==
No Evidence of Disease premiered on television on March 4, 2015. It was shown on WORLD and will continue to be broadcast in the United States by American Public Television, and in Spanish by Vme TV.

No Evidence of Disease was shown in special screenings in 2012 and 2013. The film's festival premiere was at the LA Femme Film Festival on October 18, 2013.

Beginning in 2013, the film was made available for theatrical screenings through the online platform, Tugg, and has screened at over 80 movie theaters around the world. No Evidence of Disease was shown at 44 Regal theaters on February 4, 2015 for World Cancer Day across the United States.

== Festivals & Awards ==
No Evidence of Disease has won awards and screened at many film festivals around the world, including:

- Rocky Mountain Women's Film Festival, 2013
- LA Femme Film Festival, 2013
- Everett Film Festival, 2014
- Big Picture Film Festival, 2014
- Awareness Festival, 2014
- Cinequest Film Festival, 2015
- Madelyn’s Choice Award at the Rocky Mountain Women’s Film Festival,
- Two TIVA-DC Peer Awards
- CINE Golden Eagle Award.

== Awareness efforts ==
The mission of the band, and also the film, is to raise awareness for women's cancers. Dr. Nagarsheth has said that the documentary "is just another added facet to what we're doing... The documentary is going to reach a lot of people... it's just another way to get the word out.

Several other projects related to gynecologic cancer awareness are connected to the film. A 16-minute informational film called What Every Woman Should Know features the doctors of N.E.D. and educates women about the signs and symptoms of gynecologic cancers, and encourages them to know their bodies and take control of their own health.

The filmmakers also became involved in the creation of Globeathon, an international walk to raise awareness for gynecologic cancers.
