= Escazú =

Escazú may refer to:

- Escazú (canton), a canton in the province of San José in Costa Rica
- Escazú (district), a district of the above canton
