= José Figueres Ferrer =

32nd and 36th President of Costa Rica

José Figueres Ferrer OMRI OYC OPC
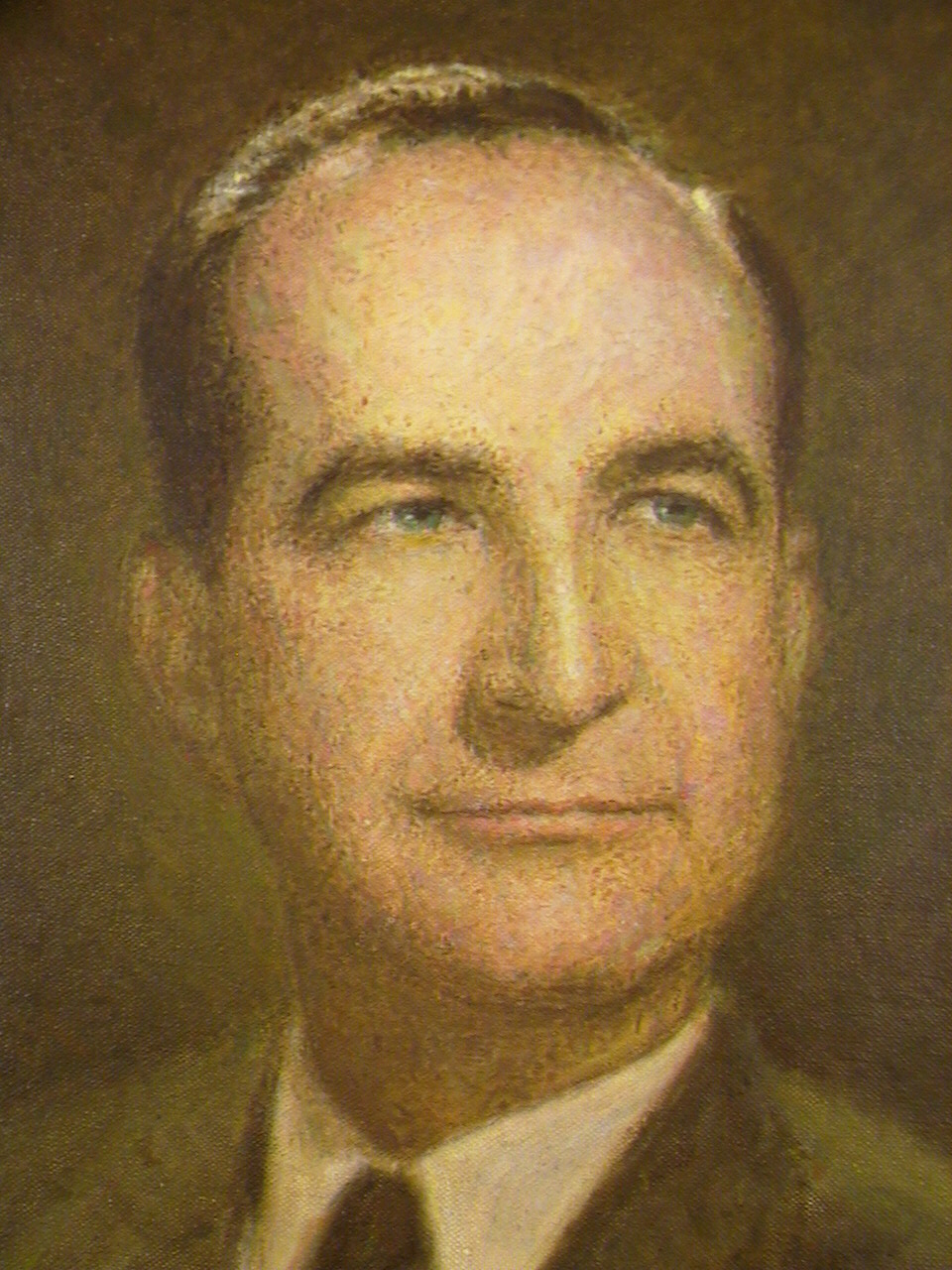
- Portrait by José Claro Ascarreta

32nd and 36th President of Costa Rica
- In office 8 May 1970 – 8 May 1974
- Vice President: Manuel Aguilar Bonilla; Jorge Rossi Chavarría
- Preceded by: José Joaquín Trejos Fernández
- Succeeded by: Daniel Oduber Quirós
- In office 8 November 1953 – 8 May 1958
- Vice President: Raúl Blanco Cervantes; Fernando Esquivel Bonilla
- Preceded by: Otilio Ulate Blanco
- Succeeded by: Mario Echandi Jiménez

President of the Founding Junta of the Second Republic
- In office 8 May 1948 – 8 November 1949
- Preceded by: Teodoro Picado Michalski (as President)
- Succeeded by: Otilio Ulate Blanco (as President)

President of the National Liberation Party
- In office August 1958 – April 1970
- Preceded by: Rafael París Steffes
- Succeeded by: Daniel Oduber Quirós

Secretary of Foreign Affairs (Note: Simultaneously in charge of the portfolios of Justice, Grace and Worship.)
- In office 23 April 1948 – 8 May 1948
- President: Santos León Herrera (acting)
- Preceded by: Julio Acosta García
- Succeeded by: Benjamín Odio Odio

Secretary of Public Security
- In office 23 April 1948 – 8 May 1948
- President: Santos León Herrera (acting)
- Preceded by: Miguel Brenes Gutiérrez
- Succeeded by: Edgar Cardona Quirós

Personal details
- Born: José María Hipólito Figueres Ferrer; 25 September 1906 San Ramón, Alajuela, Costa Rica
- Died: 8 June 1990 (aged 83) San José, Costa Rica
- Party: PLN (from 1951)
- Other political affiliations: Social Democratic (1945–1951); Democratic (1941–1945)
- Spouse(s): Henrietta Boggs (m. 1941; div. 1951) Karen Olsen Beck (m. 1954)
- Children: 6, including José María and Christiana
- Relatives: Dyalá Jiménez Figueres (granddaughter)
- Education: Massachusetts Institute of Technology
- Occupation: Landowner; politician; farmer; businessman; writter
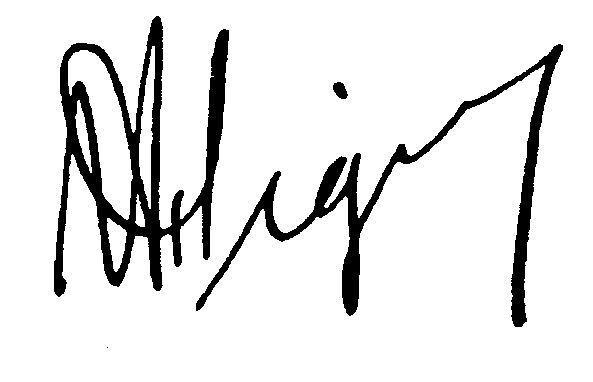
- Signature
- Nickname: Don Pepe

José María Hipólito Figueres Ferrer (25 September 1906 – 8 June 1990) was a Costa Rican farmer, revolutionary leader, and statesman who served as the 32nd and 36th President of Costa Rica from 1953 to 1958 and from 1970 to 1974. He was also the head of the Founding Junta of the Second Republic from 1948 to 1949 and the founder of the National Liberation Party.

As the victorious leader of the Costa Rican Civil War and principal architect of the Second Republic, one of Figueres's most notable achievements was the abolition of the Costa Rican army, making Costa Rica one of the first countries to permanently eliminate its standing armed forces, though the motivations for the decision have been widely debated. His junta government also nationalized the banking system, secured suffrage for women and Afro–Costa Ricans, and extended Costa Rican nationality rights to people of African descent.

During his two constitutional presidencies, Figueres oversaw the creation of the Costa Rica Institute of Technology, the National University of Costa Rica, and the Costa Rican Electricity Institute (ICE) as an autonomous institution, among other reforms. His administrations also promoted industrialization, social mobility, and the strengthening of the Costa Rican middle class.

His son José María Figueres served as President of Costa Rica from 1994 to 1998.

== Early life and career ==
Figueres was born on 25 September 1906 in San Ramón in Alajuela province. Figueres was the eldest of the four children of Mariano Figueres Forges (a doctor), and his wife, Francisca Ferrer Minguella (a teacher) who had recently immigrated from Catalonia to San Ramón in west-central Costa Rica. Figueres' first language was Catalan.

In 1924, he left for Boston, United States, on a work and study trip. There he studied hydroelectric engineering at the Massachusetts Institute of Technology. Figueres returned to Costa Rica in 1928 and bought a farm in a remote area in the mountains of San Cristóbal, Desamparados. He named the farm "La Lucha Sin Fin" (lit. "The Endless Struggle") .. This would be his home and operational headquarters until his death in 1990.

Figueres became a successful coffee grower and rope manufacturer, employing more than 1,000 sharecroppers and factory laborers. Describing himself as a "farmer-socialist", he built housing and provided medical care and recreation for his workers and established a community vegetable farm and a dairy with free milk for workers' children.

His sharecroppers could either sell hemp grown on his plantation to him at market price for use in his rope factory, or sell it elsewhere if they were offered a better price.

== Political career ==
=== Return to Costa Rica, the Caribbean Legion, and the Costa Rica Civil War (1944–1948) ===
When Figueres returned to Costa Rica in 1944 following two years in exile for criticising President Rafael Ángel Calderón Guardia, he established the Democratic Action current within the Democratic Party, which a year later transformed into the Social Democratic Party. The party was intended to be a counterweight to the ruling National Republican Party (PRN), led by former President Calderón and his successor Teodoro Picado Michalski. The highly controversial Calderón had angered Costa Rican elites, enacting a large social security retirement program and implementing national healthcare. Calderón was accused of corruption by the elites, providing a rallying cry for Figueres and the Social Democratic Party.

Figueres began training the Caribbean Legion, an irregular force of 700. Figueres launched a revolution along with other landowners and student agitators, hoping to overthrow the Costa Rican government. With plans of using Costa Rica as a base, the Legion planned next to remove the three Central American dictators. Washington officials closely watched the Legion's activities, especially after Figueres carried out a series of terrorist attacks inside Costa Rica during 1945 and 1946 that were supposed to climax in a general strike, but the people did not respond.

Former President Calderón supporters prevented and invalidated the 1 March 1948 presidential election in which Otilio Ulate had allegedly defeated Calderón in his second term bid with fraud. In March–April 1948, the protests over the election results mushroomed into armed conflict, then into revolution. Figueres defeated Communist-led guerrillas and the Costa Rican Army, which had joined forces with President Picado.

With more than 2,000 dead, the 44-day civil war was the bloodiest event in 20th-century Costa Rican history.

=== Figueres as the provisional president (1948–1949) ===
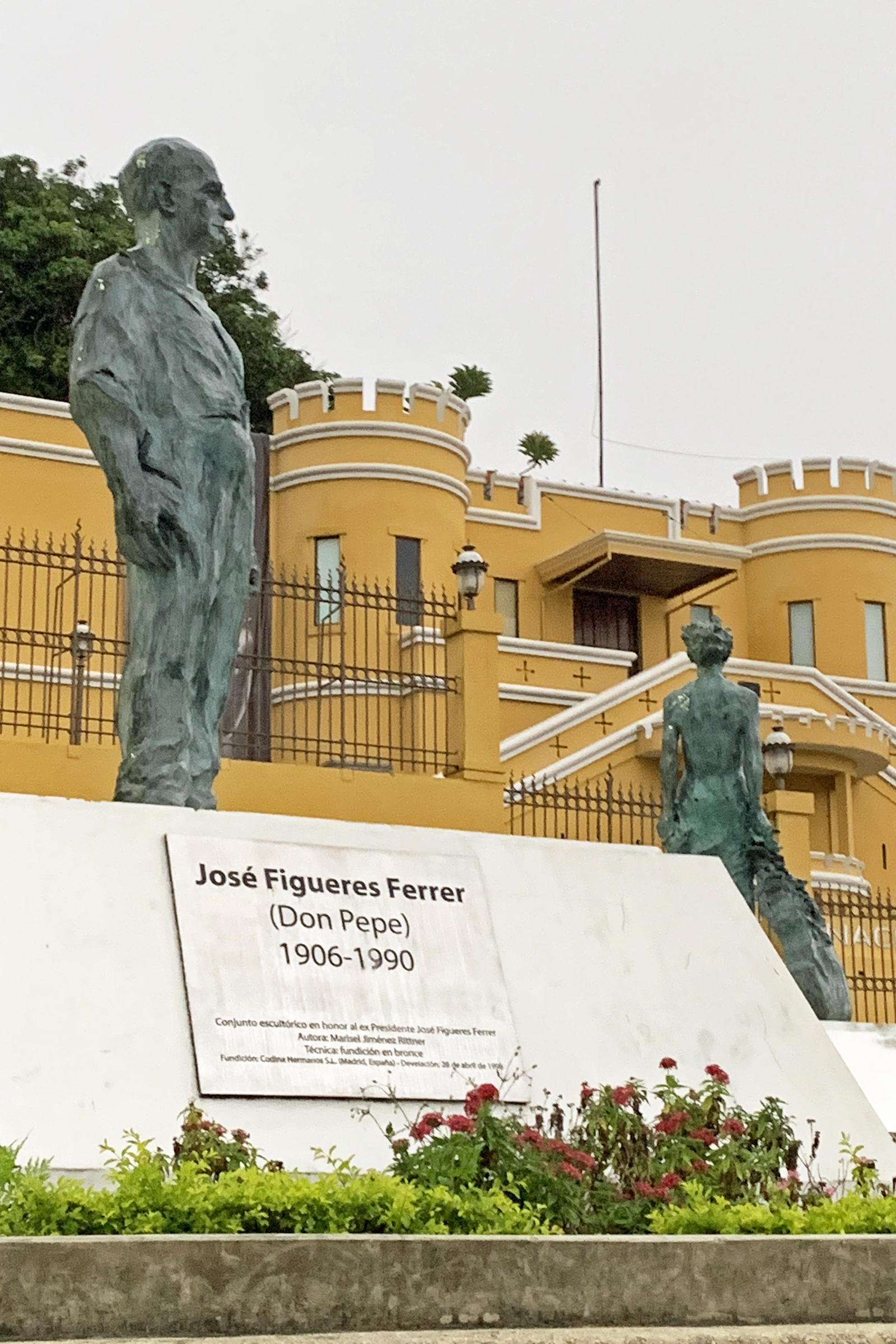
Monument to José Figueres Ferrer commemorating his abolishing of Costa Rica's army in 1948, Plaza de la Democracia, San José

After the civil war, Figueres became president at the head of a provisional junta, known as the Founding Council, that held power for 18 months. During that time he took several actions:

- abolishing the army (as a precaution against the militarism that has perennially thwarted or undercut democracy in Central America) Figueres said he was inspired to disarm Costa Rica by H. G. Wells "The Outline of History", which he read in 1920 while at MIT. "The future of mankind cannot include armed forces. Police, yes, because people are imperfect.", he declared. Ever since, Costa Rica has had no army and has maintained a 7,500-member national police force for a population of over five million.
- enabled women and illiterates to vote,
- put into effect basic welfare legislation,
- nationalised banks,
- outlawed the Communist Party,
- directed the writing of a new constitution,
- guaranteed public education for all,
- gave citizenship to black immigrants' children,
- established civil service to eliminate the spoils system in government, and

"In a short time, we decreed 834 reforms that completely changed the physiognomy of the country and brought a deeper and more human revolution than that of Cuba", Figueres said in a 1981 interview.

Once Figueres gained control, the legislation he passed regarding social reform was not that much different from Calderón's proposals. In fact, it is believed by some historians, such as David LaWare, that Figueres' social reforms were more or less the same as Calderón's Labor Code of 1943, with the primary difference being that Figueres had gained the power with which to enact the laws, holding the complete support of virtually all the country. Both of these leaders' programs were in many cases exactly like the ones Franklin D. Roosevelt passed during the Great Depression that helped lift the US out of its own economic slump and social decline it had faced in the 1930s. Figueres admired what president Franklin D. Roosevelt did; however, he noted that "the price he had to pay to get his programs through was to leave the business community free overseas to set up dictatorships and do whatever they liked...What we need now is an international New Deal, to change the relations between North and South."

Figueres stepped down after 18 months, handing his power over to Otilio Ulate, and ever since Costa Ricans have settled their arguments constitutionally.

"Your hands are not clean to fight communism when you don't fight dictatorships", Figueres told American interviewers in 1951. "It seems that the United States is not interested in honest government down here, as long as a government is not communist and pays lip service to democracy."

=== Second term as President (1953–1958) ===
In 1953, Figueres created the Partido Liberación Nacional (PLN), the most successful party in Costa Rican political history, and was returned to power in 1953. He has been considered to be the most important political figure in Costa Rica's history.

During his various terms in office he nationalized the banking system and contributed to the construction of the Pan-American Highway that goes across Central America. He promoted the private industry sector and stimulated the national industry sector. He succeeded in energizing the country's middle class creating a strong buffer between the upper and lower classes.

What most alarmed U.S. officials was Figueres's material and moral support for the Caribbean Legion, even though Figueres had obviously lost interest in the Legion after he gained power. But Figueres still criticized U.S. support for the dictators, going so far as to boycott the 1954 inter-American meeting because it was held in Caracas, where President of Venezuela Marcos Pérez Jiménez, a military ruler, held sway.

Figueres happily cooperated with North American military plans. After the United States established the School of the Americas in the Panama Canal Zone to train Latin American officers in Anti-Communist techniques, more Costa Rican "police" graduated from the School between 1950 and 1965 than did officers of any other hemispheric nation except Nicaragua.

In 1957 Figueres was the subject of an assassination attempt by Cuban exiles, including Herminio Díaz García, who were operating under the orders of Nicaraguan dictator Luis Somoza Debayle and Dominican dictator Rafael Trujillo. Three days after their arrival they were arrested by Costa Rican authorities as they were staking out the Presidential Palace. Once captured they confessed to the authorities that Trujillo had promised them $200,000 and further aid to overthrow Batista in exchange for their services. They received a six month prison sentence.

=== Border war with Somoza's Nicaragua (1954–1955) ===
Figueres's support for the Caribbean Legion nearly cost him his job during this second presidency. Implicated in an invasion of Nicaragua in April 1954 by anti-Somoza exiles linked to the Caribbean Legion, Anastasio Somoza García launched a counter-attack, allowing the exiled former Costa Rica president Rafael Calderón to invade Costa Rica in January 1955.

The Nicaraguan dictator withdrew, but not before extracting a commitment from Figueres that he would sever links with the exiles.

=== 1958 testimony before U.S. Congress ===
In 1958, during a visit to Caracas, Venezuela, U.S. Vice President Richard Nixon was spat at by anti-American protesters who also disrupted and assaulted Nixon's motorcade, pelting his limousine with rocks, shattering windows, and injuring Venezuela's foreign minister. The event prompted the United States Congress to create a special committee to investigate the reasons behind it. Many people were invited to speak before it, including Figueres, who testified on 9 June 1958. Figueres condemned the Venezuelans, but said that he understood them, criticizing the United States for their support of Rafael Trujillo, resource extraction, and enabling of corruption and autocracy.

=== Third presidential term (1970–1974) ===
The termination of Alliance for Progress funds as well as the collapse of the Central American Common Market, threatened to cripple the country's economy until Figueres discovered a new market by selling 30,000 tons of coffee to the Soviet Union in 1972. Costa Rica then became the only Central American nation to establish diplomatic relations with Moscow. The World Bank and International Monetary Fund also delivered millions of dollars to keep the economy afloat.

When opponents of Nicaragua's President Anastasio Somoza Debayle seized a plane flying from Managua to Miami and forced it to land in San José in 1971, holding the passengers hostage and demanding fuel for a diverted flight to Cuba, Figueres ordered Costa Rican police to shoot out the engines and tires. The hijackers demanded a new plane in return for the release of hostages, to which Figueres agreed, and the hostages were released; however, when the four hijackers themselves debarked, the 160-centimetre-tall Figueres, with a submachine gun in hand, met them with 200 armed police, and a shootout ensued in which 2 hijackers were killed.

By his own account, he also nearly ruined a 1973 Central American summit when he lambasted five army generals, saying, "Isn't it odd that all you bastards are generals, and I'm the only civilian, but I'm the only one who's ever fought a war?"

== Political connections ==
=== KGB ===
According to revelations from the Mitrokhin Archive, the KGB secretly transmitted to Figueres a $300,000 loan via the Costa Rican Communist Party to help finance his 1970 campaign, in exchange for establishing diplomatic relations with the Soviet Union, which he did upon election. Figueres later escalated his relationship with the San Jose residency of the KGB, expanding his activities to providing confidential reports on other countries in Central America and the Caribbean.

In 1974, a KGB report to Leonid Brezhnev revealed that Figueres had agreed to publish materials advantageous to the KGB. For this reason, he was given $10,000 under the guise of stock purchases in his newspaper.

=== CIA ===
Figueres himself acknowledged in 1981 that he had received help from the Central Intelligence Agency, saying, "At the time, I was conspiring against the Latin American dictatorships and wanted help from the United States, I was a good friend of Allen Dulles," and, "The CIA's Cultural Department helped me finance a magazine and some youth conferences here. But I never participated in espionage. I did beg them not to carry out the Bay of Pigs Invasion of Cuba, which was madness, but they ignored me."

=== Relationship with Cuba ===
Figueres also opposed the dictatorial regime in pre-Castro Cuba and went so far as to dispatch a planeload of weapons for Cuban insurgents led by the young Fidel Castro, a member of Caribbean Legion. But soon after the 1959 success of the Cuban Revolution, he and Mr. Figueres had a falling out over the growth of Communist influence on the island. In March, 1959, Figueres was invited to Havana, and during a public speech, he warned Castro about the ideological deviations he had observed in Cuba, and immediately the microphone was taken from him. Figueres supported John F. Kennedy's Alliance for Progress but not the C.I.A.'s clandestine wars with Cuba.

=== Robert Vesco, fugitive U.S. financier ===
Figueres was stubborn about his blunders, most notably his most controversial decision to grant asylum to Robert Vesco, the fugitive U.S. financier, accused of looting millions of dollars from the Investors Overseas Service, Ltd. (IOS) mutual funds in the 1970s. Mr. Vesco not only had a personal and business relationship with Mr. Figueres but he also made contributions to the campaign coffers of both leading political parties in the 1974 elections. Figueres made it clear, however, that he would not hesitate to extradite Vesco if the United States requested it. Figueres tried to intervene with president Jimmy Carter on Vesco's behalf. In the resulting political uproar in Costa Rica, Figueres' party lost the 1978 presidential election. Robert Vesco left Costa Rica after the Presidential elections of 1978 were won by Rodrigo Carazo, who had vowed to expel him.

In an interview in 1981, Figueres said that Vesco had "committed many stupidities" but added:

"I have always defended asylum and would protect him again if I could because I never abandon my friends. The only thing that pains me is that some friends thought I personally benefitted from Vesco."

Earlier, in a 1973 interview, Figueres said that he had been introduced to Vesco in Costa Rica in 1972 and that Vesco had then arranged for the investment of $2.15 million in Sociedad Agricola Industrial San Cristobal, S.A. The financially troubled company was founded by Figueres and owned by him and others. It had diverse operations in agriculture and its 3,000 employees made it the fourth-largest employer in Costa Rica.

== Career after presidency ==
Figueres was well liked and received in many Latin American countries for his center-left ideals.

After the presidency, as an acknowledged elder statesman, Figueres became a de facto ambassador for subsequent administrations.

Figueres backed the left-wing Nicaraguan Revolution that overthrew dictator Anastasio Somoza Debayle in 1979. He railed against U.S. policy when the United States supported Nicaragua's Contras.

A proposal by his supporters for a fourth presidential term in the 1980s was quickly crushed.

"This is an exemplary little country. We are the example for Latin America", Figueres told the Los Angeles Times in a 1986 interview. "In the next century, maybe everyone will be like us."

== Global policy ==
He was one of the signatories of the agreement to convene a convention for drafting a world constitution. As a result, for the first time in human history, a World Constituent Assembly convened to draft and adopt the Constitution for the Federation of Earth.

== Personal life ==
Figueres married Henrietta Boggs from the United States in 1941. They had two children, Muni and José Martí, before the marriage ended in divorce in 1954. He later married Karen Olsen Beck, also from the United States. They had four children: José María, Karen Christiana, Mariano and Kirsten. His wife was a member of the country's Legislative Assembly.

He was a good friend of the Governor of Puerto Rico, Luis Muñoz Marín, praising his political achievements in one of his essays.

His son, José María, also served as president from 1994 to 1998. His daughter, Muni Figueres Boggs, was a former Ambassador from Costa Rica to the United States. His other daughter, Christiana, is a Costa Rican diplomat who served from 2010 to 2016 as the Executive Secretary of the UN Framework Convention on Climate Change (UNFCCC), and is widely considered to be the architect of the Paris Agreement.

== Death ==
He died on 8 June 1990 in San José aged 83 from natural causes. He was given a state funeral by the government and his former comrades who fought with him in the 1948 & 1955 revolutions. After the funeral, his remains were taken to La Lucha Sin Fin, his farm which he owned since 1928.

== Awards ==
- Taiwan: Order of Propitious Clouds (1973)

== See also ==
- Costa Rican Civil War

== Notes ==
Political offices
Preceded by Teodoro Picado	President of Costa Rica; 1948–1949	Succeeded by Otilio Ulate
Preceded by Otilio Ulate	President of Costa Rica; 1953–1958	Succeeded by Mario Echandi
Preceded by José Joaquín Trejos	President of Costa Rica; 1970–1974	Succeeded by Daniel Oduber
