= Spark Media =

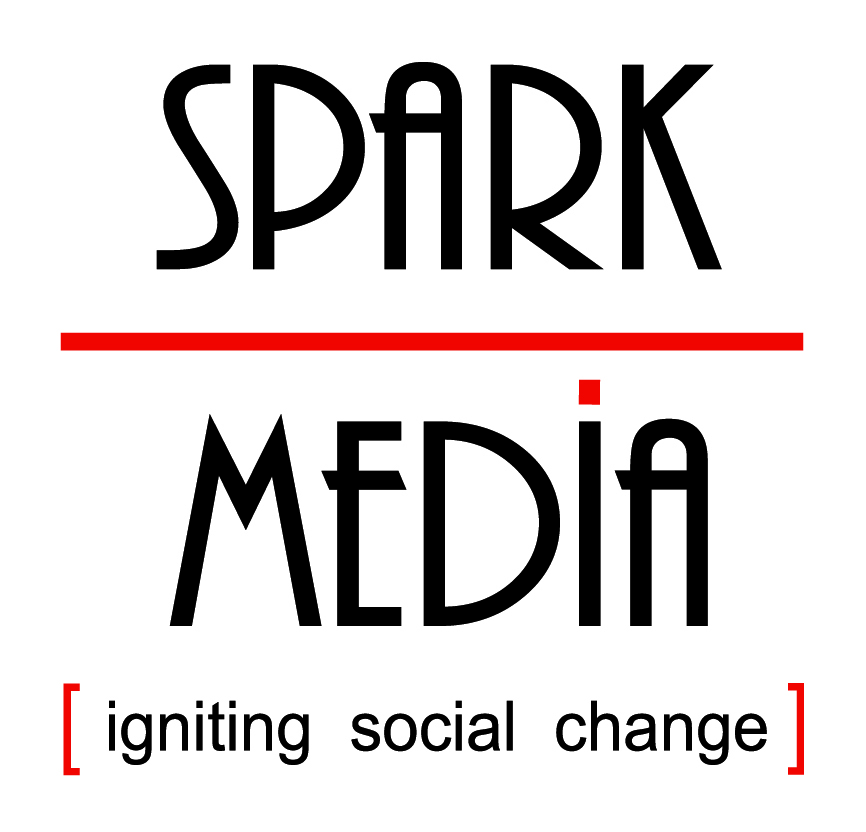
- Type: Private
- Industry: Film production
- Founded: 1989
- Founder: Andrea Kalin
- Headquarters: Washington, D.C., United States
- Key people: Andrea Kalin, James Mirabello, Ethan Oser, Karen Simon, Diana Moss
- Website: sparkmedia.org

Spark Media is an American independent multimedia and documentary production house based in Washington, D.C., United States.

== History ==
Established in 1989 by director and producer Andrea Kalin, the company specializes in creating socially conscious media used to raise public awareness in America and throughout the world. The company has produced over a dozen films, including the documentary short Public Defender and twelve feature-length documentaries: Scattering CJ, First Lady of the Revolution (Reel South on PBS), Red Lines (Free Speech TV), No Evidence of Disease (American Public Television, World Channel, V-me), Soul of a People: Writing America's Story (Smithsonian Channel), Worlds of Sounds: Ballard of Folkways (Smithsonian Channel), Talking Through Walls (PBS), Prince Among Slaves (PBS), Allah Made Me Funny (theatrical release), The Pact (American Public Television), and Partners of the Heart (PBS American Experience).

Partners of the Heart, narrated by Morgan Freeman, aired on PBS’s American Experience in February 2003 and was rebroadcast in March 2005. Partners of the Heart went on to win the Erik Barnouw Award for Best History Documentary in 2004 and was later turned into the Golden Globe-nominated HBO film Something The Lord Made starring Mos Def, who also narrated Prince Among Slaves. As part of their 50th anniversary celebration, the National Endowment for the Humanities highlighted Partners of the Heart as one of 50 top grant projects that have enriched and shaped American lives.

Spark Media's films have won numerous awards, among them Emmys, CINE Golden Eagles, Gracies, as well as a Writers Guild of America nomination.

== Current projects ==
=== Documentaries ===
In 2024, the documentary short Public Defender premiered at Mountainfilm in Telluride, Colorado, where it won the Moving Mountains Award for social justice and impact. The film tells the story Heather Shaner, a public defender in Washington, D.C., who has spent 40 years representing people who can’t afford a lawyer. On January 6, 2021, Shaner’s empathy is challenged when a violent mob supporting outgoing President Donald Trump storms the Capitol to stop the peaceful transfer of power to President-elect Joe Biden. The goal of the film is to address America’s epidemic of division and misinformation, showing how to restore trust and accountability one conversation at a time.

Following the festival premiere, Public Defender was published by The New Yorker on October 9, 2024. In addition to The New Yorker, the documentary was also broadcast in Israel by yes, in Japan by NHK World-Japan, by Scripps News in the United States on November 3, 2024 as part of their Emmy-winning documentary series, "In Real Life," and by WETA-TV.

In early 2019, Spark Media completed production on Scattering CJ, the story of CJ Twomey, a seemingly happy Air Force recruit who violently ended his own life at age 20, whose passing plunged his family into unrelenting grief and guilt. Years later, in a moment of desperate inspiration, his mother put out an open call on Facebook, looking only for a handful of world travelers who might help fulfill her son's wish to see the world by scattering some of his ashes in a place of beauty or special meaning to them - a call that 21,000 would answer. Scattering CJ had its world premiere at the Camden International Film Festival in September 2019. On November 21, 2020, the filmmakers hosted a live virtual conversation about the film and suicide prevention to commemorate International Survivors of Suicide Loss Day. Scattering CJ premiered on public television in September 2022, including a national broadcast on PBS WORLD Channel on September 16, 2023.

Spark Media is also in post-production on Klandestine Man, about Stetson Kennedy, the folklorist and social justice activist who famously infiltrated the Ku Klux Klan in the 1950s with the goal of dismantling the violent white supremacist group from the inside out.

=== Digital Projects ===
With funding from the National Endowment for the Humanities Office of Digital Humanities, Spark Media began production on Project Maestro (now known as humanities.games) in 2019, an open-source platform that "empowers educators and students with limited computer access to make digital humanities games." The platform was first created for Spark Media's game The Search For Harmony, a web game about the rich, forgotten historical legacy of classical musicians of African descent.

In December 2020, Spark Media in collaboration with UXR Tech completed production on El 48, a virtual reality experience based on the abolition of the Costa Rican army. The exhibit was opened on December 1, 2020, the anniversary of the abolition of the military, is currently housed at Museo Nacional de Costa Rica and is the first of its kind at the museum.

=== Podcasts ===
In 2024, Spark Media released a podcast series called The People's Recorder which explores stories first unearthed by Works Progress Administration writers and artists in the 1930s. Spark Media is producing the podcast with support from the National Endowment for the Humanities, Florida Humanities Council, Virginia Humanities, Wisconsin Humanities, California Humanities, and Humanities Nebraska. A second season of the podcast is currently in production, supported by the National Endowment for the Humanities.

== Films ==
- Public Defender
- Scattering CJ
- My America
- Syria: A Decade of Atrocities
- Resolute: Leading in Turbulent Times
- Celebrating ChangermakHERS: GirlTrek
- First Lady of the Revolution
- Red Lines
- No Evidence of Disease
- What Every Woman Should Know
- People Will Carry Your Story
- Worlds of Sounds: Ballard of Folkways
- Soul of a People: Writing America's Story
- The Pact
- Prince Among Slaves
- Partners of the Heart
- Talking Through Walls
- Allah Made Me Funny: Live in Concert
- Asia’s Water Crisis: The Struggle Within Each Drop
- Battered Lives, Broken Trust: When Men Abuse Women
- Too Brief a Child: Voices of Married Adolescents
- Breaking the Poverty Cycle: Investing in Early Childhood
- Bridges: Southeast Asians’ American Journey
- Wired for Change: Information Technology for Development in the Americas
- A Voice of Her Own: Women and Economic Change in Asia
- From Rage to Recovery: Society’s Search for Peace
- World Bank HUNGER Public Service Announcement
