= Mountainfilm =

Annual film festival in Colorado, US

Mountainfilm is a documentary film festival that showcases nonfiction stories about environmental, cultural, climbing, political and social justice issues in Telluride, Colorado. It has been held every Memorial Day weekend since 1979.

In 2000, Mountainfilm started touring its films and speakers internationally with Mountainfilm on Tour. Mountainfilm has since added Mountainfilm for Students, an educational component for schools across the country with free screenings of festival films that are supported by customized educational materials. Mountainfilm also funds Mountainfilm Commitment Grants, annual grants for filmmakers, photographers, artists and adventurers.

== History ==
Mountainfilm began in 1979, when Telluride was completing its transition from a hard-rock gold and silver mining community to a destination resort and ski town. Lito Tejada-Flores, after screening his adventure and mountaineering film Fitzroy at the Trento festival in Italy, and Bill Kees, a local climber and avid outdoorsman, inaugurated the event. Over three nights, at the historic Sheridan Opera House, they screened a dozen films about mountain sports, mountain cultures and mountain issues. During the daytime, audience members took to the mountains for adventure themselves.

In 1980, Jeff Lowe and Family were the headliners and Bill Kees, Lito Tejada-Flores became retired directors and supporters. The board of directors was expanded over the years to include Sue Cobb, Royal Robbins, Henry Barber, Mike Kennedy, Sir Edmund Hillary, Bob Craig, David Brower, David Brashears.

The event was held virtually in 2020 due to the COVID-19 pandemic, and was held in person in a limited capacity in 2021.

== Speakers ==
Mountainfilm has hosted such speakers as Bill McKibben, Chris Sharma, Wade Davis, Sandra Steingraber, Sir Edmund Hillary, Richard Holbrooke, Dianne Feinstein, Galen Rowell, George Schaller, Phil Borges, Frans Lanting, Lynn Hill, David Brower, Pete Athans, Timmy O'Neill, Subhankar Banerjee, David Breashears, Norman Vaughan, Martin Litton, James Balog, Maurice Herzog, Gretel Ehrlich, Timothy Treadwell, David James Duncan, Julia Butterfly Hill, John Grunsfeld, Angela Fisher, Paul Pritchard, Rick Ridgeway and Carl Pope.

== Mountainfilm on Tour ==
In 2000, Mountainfilm introduced Mountainfilm on Tour, which presents over 150 shows per year worldwide. More than 65,000 people attend across 6 continents.

== Founders ==
Founders include Royal Robbins, Lito Tejada-Flores, then president of American Alpine Club, Bob Craig and Telluride local Bill Kees, along with help from former Climbing magazine owner/publisher Michael Kennedy and Patagonia founder Yvon Chouinard.
