= List of presidents of the Legislative Assembly of Costa Rica =

Presiding officer of the Legislative Assembly of Costa Rica

President of the Legislative Assembly of the Republic of Costa Rica
- Coat of arms of Costa Rica

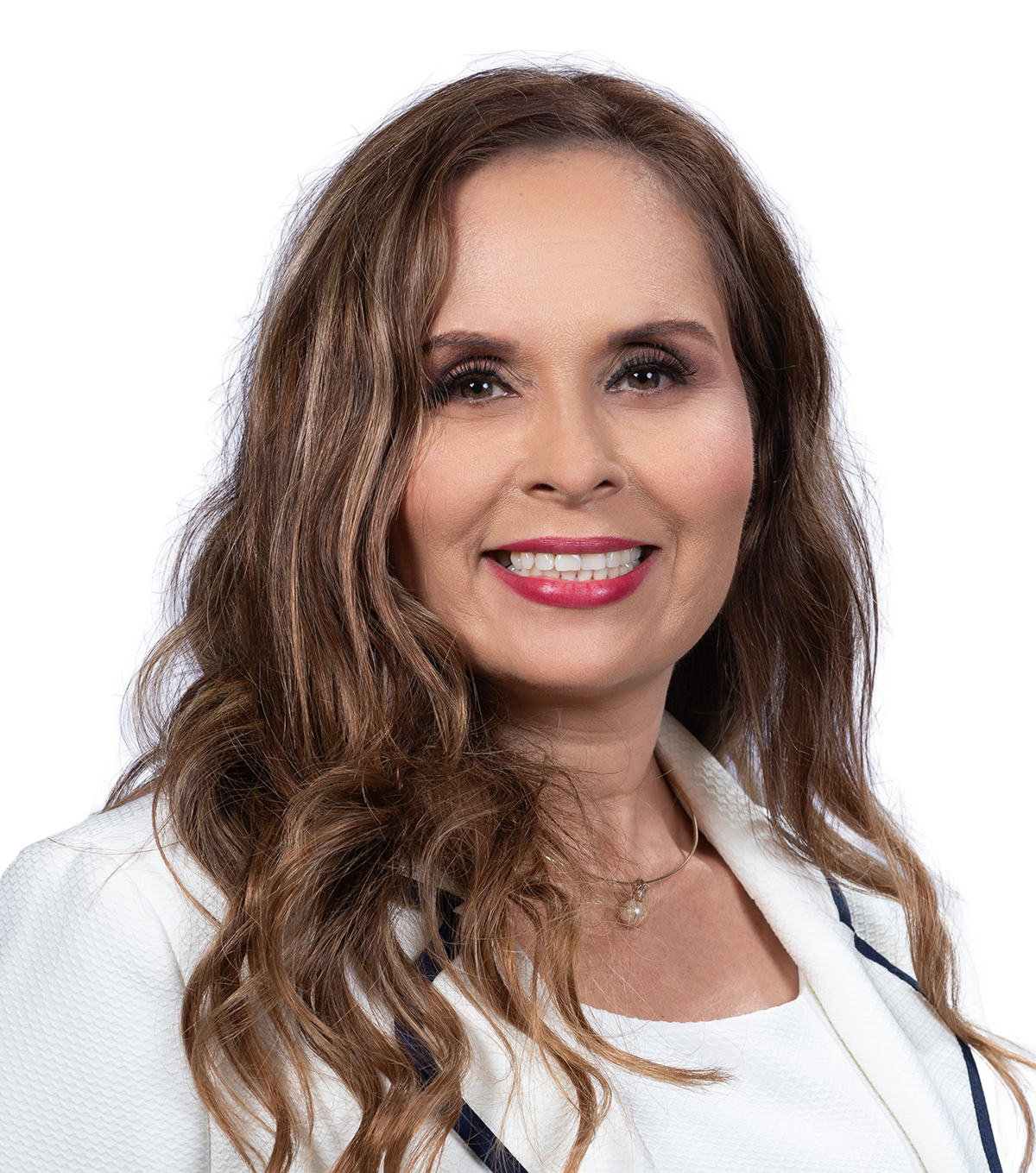
- Incumbent; Yara Jiménez Fallas since 1 May 2026
- Style: Madam President
- Appointer: Legislative Assembly
- Term length: One year
- Inaugural holder: Manuel Aguilar Chacón
- Formation: 1824; 1949 (current form)

The President of the Legislative Assembly is the presiding officer of the Legislative Assembly of Costa Rica. The president is elected at the first meeting of the Assembly in each legislative year by a simple majority vote of the deputies.

The powers of the office are established in Article 27 of the Regulations of the Legislative Assembly. The officeholder presides over debates, appoints standing committees, refers legislative bills to the appropriate committees, grants the floor and calls deputies to order, and signs (together with the secretaries) the minutes, laws, and other legislative provisions. The president may also grant leave of absence to deputies and oversees internal administrative and procurement processes in accordance with applicable legislation.

Costa Rica has maintained a presiding officer for its legislature since the establishment of its first Congress under the Fundamental Law of the State of Costa Rica. The current structure of the office is defined by the 1949 Constitution, which replaced the earlier Constitutional Congress with the present Legislative Assembly.

President	Tenure	Party
Federal Republic of Central America
Manuel Aguilar Chacón	1824 November – 1825 January	
Agustín Gutiérrez y Lizaurzábal	1824 September – November	
Cecilio Umaña Fallas	1825 April – May	
Manuel Alvarado Hidalgo	1825 January – February	
Manuel Alvarado Alvarado	1825 February – April	
Pedro Zeledón Mora	1825 June – November	
Félix Romero Castro	1825 November – December	
José María Arias Zamora	1826 January – February	
Joaquín Rivas Ramírez	1826 March – May	
Francisco Javier Alfaro Zamora	1826 May – August	
José Antonio Castro Ramírez	1827 May – June	
Braulio Carrillo Colina	1828 March	
José Joaquín Flores Pérez	1828 September	
Manuel María Peralta del Corral	1829 November – 1830 February	
Luciano Alfaro Arias	1830 May – June	
José María Esquivel Azofeifa	1830 May – June	
Rafael Francisco Osejo	1831 January – April	
José Gabriel Campo Guerrero	1831 July – August	
José Nereo Fonseca González	1831 May – June	
José Francisco Peralta del Corral	1832 setiembre – December	
José Andrés Rivera	1834 March – April	
Manuel Antonio Bonilla Nava	1836 August – December	
Francisco Javier Sáenz Ulloa	1836 January – February	
Miguel Alfaro Saborío	1837 January – February	
José Julián Blanco Zamora	1837 March – April	
Francisco María Oreamuno Bonilla	1837 March – April	
Félix Sancho Alvarado	1837 September – 1838 May	
Free State of Costa Rica
Juan Mora Fernández	1843 August – December	
Juan de los Santos Madriz Cervantes	1843 June – August	
Félix Sancho Alvarado	1844 January – May	
Rafael Ramírez Hidalgo	1844 July – November	
José María Castro Madriz	1845 November 1844 – December	
Juan Rafael Reyes Frutos	1846 December – 1846 February	
Manuel José Carazo Bonilla	1846 March – June	
Nazario Toledo	1846 September – 1847 May	
José María Alfaro Zamora	1847 May – September	
First Costa Rican Republic
Juan Rafael Mora Porras	1847 November – 1848 June	
Manuel José Carazo Bonilla	1848 September – 1849 December	
Francisco María Oreamuno Bonilla	1850 January – 1856 May	
Rafael García-Escalante Nava	1857 October – 1858 August	
José María Castro Madriz	1859 October – December	
Julián Volio Llorente	1860 – 1863	
Manuel José Carazo Bonilla	1860 – 1861	
Rafael Ramírez Hidalgo	1861 – 1862	
Manuel José Carazo Bonilla	1862 – 1863	
Napoleón Escalante Navas	1863 May – August	
Rafael Ramírez Hidalgo	1863 May – August	
Joaquín Bernardo Calvo Rosales	1864 – 1867	
Francisco María Iglesias Llorente	1864 – 1865	
José María Montealegre Fernández	1867 – 1868	
Francisco María Iglesias Llorente	1867 – 1868	
Juan José Ulloa Solares	1869 January – February	
Francisco Echeverría Alvarado	1869 May – 1870 April	
Manuel Antonio Bonilla Nava	1869 – 1876	
Víctor Guardia Gutiérrez	1882 – 1883	
Juan Manuel Carazo Peralta	1883 – 1886	
Aniceto Esquivel Sáenz	1886 – 1889	
Manuel Aragón Quesada	1889 – 1890	
Francisco María Iglesias Llorente	1890 – 1892	
Carlos Durán Cartín	1892	
Pedro María León-Páez y Brown	1894 – 1900	
Francisco María Iglesias Llorente	1900 – 1903	
Ricardo Jiménez Oreamuno	1900 – 1903	
Mauro Fernández Acuña	1904 – 1905	
Federico Tinoco Iglesias	1905 – 1908	
Juan Bautista Quirós Segura	1905 – 1908	
Ricardo Jiménez Oreamuno	1909 – 1910	
Ezequiel Gutiérrez Iglesias	1910 – 1913	
Máximo Fernández Alvarado	1913 – 1914	
Leonidas Pacheco Cabezas	1914 – 1916	
Máximo Fernández Alvarado	1916 – 1917	
Daniel Núñez Gutiérrez	1917 – 1918	
Leonidas Pacheco Cabezas	1917 April – June	Peliquista Party
José Astúa Aguilar	1917 – 1918	Peliquista Party
Rafael Calderón Muñoz	1917 – 1918	Peliquista Party
Francisco Faerron Suárez	1918 – 1919	Peliquista Party
José Astúa Aguilar	1919	Peliquista Party
Arturo Volio Jiménez	1920 – 1925	Republican Party
León Cortés Castro	1925 – 1926	Republican Party
Arturo Volio Jiménez	1926 – 1929	Republican Party
Alejandro Alvarado Quirós	1929 – 1930	Republican Party
Oscar Rohrmoser Carranza	1929 – 1930	Republican Party
Rafael Calderón Muñoz	1931 – 1932	National Republican Party
Arturo Volio Jiménez	1932 – 1935	National Republican Party
Ricardo Castro Beeche	1935 – 1936	National Republican Party
Juan Rafael Arias Bonilla	1936 – 1938	National Republican Party
Rafael Ángel Calderón Guardia	1938 – 1940	National Republican Party
Otto Cortés Fernández	1940 – 1941	Democratic Party
Teodoro Picado Michalski	1941 – 1944	National Republican Party
José Albertazzi Avendaño	1944 – 1945	National Republican Party
Rafael Ángel Grillo Ocampo	1944 – 1945	National Republican Party
Francisco Fonseca Chamier	1946 – 1948	National Republican Party
Second Costa Rican Republic
Marcial Rodríguez Conejo	1949 – 1952	National Union Party
Abelardo Bonilla Baldares	1952 – 1953	National Union Party
Gonzalo Facio Segreda	1953 – 1956	National Liberation Party
Otto Cortés Fernández	1956 – 1958	National Liberation Party
Álvaro Montero Padilla	1958 – 1960	National Union Party
Fernando Lara Bustamante	1960 – 1961	National Union Party
Mario Leiva Quirós	1961 – 1962	National Union Party
Carlos Espinach Escalante	1962 – 1963	National Liberation Party
Rafael París Steffens	1963 – 1964	National Liberation Party
Rodolfo Solano Orfila	1964 – 1965	National Liberation Party
Rafael París Steffens	1965 – 1966	National Liberation Party
Rodrigo Carazo Odio	1966 – 1967	National Liberation Party
Hernán Garrón Salazar	1967 – 1968	National Liberation Party
Fernando Volio Jiménez	1968 – 1969	National Liberation Party
José Luis Molina Quesada	1969 – 1970	National Liberation Party
Daniel Oduber Quirós	1970 – 1973	National Liberation Party
Luis Alberto Monge Álvarez	1973 – 1974	National Liberation Party
Alfonso Carro Zúñiga	1974 – 1977	National Liberation Party
Elías Soley Soler	1977 – 1978	National Liberation Party
Rodrigo Madrigal Nieto	1978 – 1979	Unity Coalition
Ramón Aguilar Facio	1979 – 1980	Unity Coalition
Rafael Grillo Rivera	1980 – 1981	Unity Coalition
Cristian Tattenbach Iglesias	1981 – 1982	Unity Coalition
Hernán Garrón Salazar	1982 – 1983	National Liberation Party
Jorge Luis Villanueva Badilla	1983 – 1984	National Liberation Party
Bernal Jiménez Monge	1984 – 1985	National Liberation Party
Guillermo Vargas Sanabria	1985 – 1986	National Liberation Party
Rose Marie Karpinsky Dodero	1986 – 1987	National Liberation Party
Fernando Volio Jiménez	1987 – 1988	National Liberation Party
José Luis Valenciano Chaves	1988 – 1989	National Liberation Party
Allen Arias Angulo	1989 – 1990	National Liberation Party
Juan José Trejos Fonseca	1990 – 1991	Social Christian Unity Party
Miguel Ángel Rodríguez Echeverría	1991 – 1992	Social Christian Unity Party
Roberto Tovar Faja	1992 – 1993	Social Christian Unity Party
Danilo Chaverri Soto	1993 – 1994	Social Christian Unity Party
Alberto Cañas Escalante	1994 – 1995	National Liberation Party
Antonio Álvarez Desanti	1995 – 1996	National Liberation Party
Jorge Walter Coto Molina	1996 – 1997	National Liberation Party
Saúl Weisleder Weisleder	1997 – 1998	National Liberation Party
Luis Fishman Zonzinski	1998 – 1999	Social Christian Unity Party
Carlos Vargas Pagán	1999 – 2000	Social Christian Unity Party
Rina Contreras López	2000 – 2001	Social Christian Unity Party
Ovidio Pacheco Salazar	2001 – 2002	Social Christian Unity Party
Rolando Laclé Castro	2002 – 2003	Social Christian Unity Party
Mario Redondo Poveda	2003 – 2004	Social Christian Unity Party
Gerardo González Esquivel	2004 – 2006	Social Christian Unity Party
Francisco Antonio Pacheco Fernández	2006 – 2010	National Liberation Party
Luis Gerardo Villanueva Monge	2010 – 2011	National Liberation Party
Juan Carlos Mendoza García	2011 – 2012	Citizens' Action Party
Víctor Emilio Granados Calvo	2012 – 2013	Accessibility without Exclusion Party
Luis Fernando Mendoza Jiménez	2013 – 2014	National Liberation Party
Henry Mora Jiménez	2014 – 2015	Citizens' Action Party
Rafael Ortiz Fábrega	2015 – 2016	Social Christian Unity Party
Antonio Álvarez Desanti	2016 – 2017	National Liberation Party
Gonzalo Alberto Ramírez Zamora	2017 – 2018	Costa Rican Renewal Party
Carolina Hidalgo Herrera	2018 – 2019	Citizens' Action Party
Carlos Ricardo Benavides Jiménez	2019 – 2020	National Liberation Party
Eduardo Cruickshank Smith	2020 – 2021	National Restoration Party
Silvia Hernández Sánchez	2021 – 2022	National Liberation Party
Rodrigo Arias Sánchez	2022 – 2026	National Liberation Party
Yara Jiménez Fallas	2026 – present	Sovereign People's Party

== Sources ==
- Official website
