= 1863 Costa Rican general election =

- 5 April 1863 (electoral college)
- Presidential election
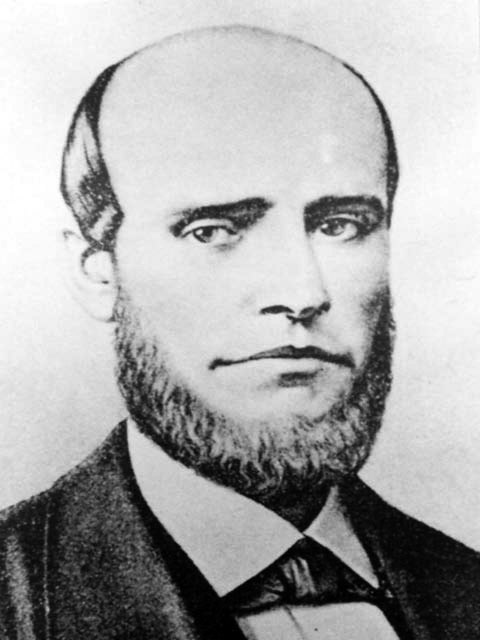
Nominee	Jesús Jiménez Zamora
Party	Independent
Alliance	Anti-morismo
Electoral vote	299
Percentage	98.68%
President before election
José María Montealegre
Independent
Elected President
Jesús Jiménez Zamora
Independent

General elections were held in Costa Rica on 5 April 1863 to elect the president for a three-year term. Incumbent José María Montealegre was constitutionally barred from seeking immediate re-election. Former First Designate Jesús Jiménez Zamora was elected with 98.7% of the electoral vote, becoming the first president from Cartago Province and the second physician to hold the office.

== Background ==
The election was held less than three years after the execution of former President Juan Rafael Mora Porras, an event that continued to shape the political landscape. During the 1862 campaign, the country's political elite remained divided between rival antimorista factions that had emerged following Mora's overthrow in August 1859.

One faction was led by Francisco Montealegre Fernández and included figures such as Second Designate Manuel José Carazo Bonilla and General Máximo Blanco Rodríguez. Another, known as the Tinoquistas, was headed by Saturnino Tinoco López and included Foreign Secretary Francisco María Yglesias Llorente, First Designate Julián Volio Llorente, former President José María Castro Madriz, and General Lorenzo Salazar Alvarado.

According to the memoirs of Manuel Argüello Mora, Francisco Montealegre proposed supporting a compromise candidate who had not become closely identified with either political faction. General Blanco subsequently suggested Jesús Jiménez Zamora, a physician, former congressman and First Designate, whose candidacy gained broad support among both groups.

On 25 August 1862, the bicameral Congress formally called the election and ordered the renewal of the Electoral Assemblies in accordance with the Constitution and the Electoral Law.

== Electoral system ==
The election was conducted under the Electoral Law of 1862 (Decree No. 25), which retained Costa Rica's indirect electoral system. Citizens in good standing voted in Popular Assemblies to elect members of the Electoral Assemblies, which in turn elected the President of the Republic, members of Congress, and other public officials.

The law reorganized the country into five provinces and the comarca of Puntarenas for electoral purposes. Electors were required to be literate citizens at least 25 years of age, resident in the province they represented, and to possess either property valued at a minimum of 500 pesos or an annual income of at least 200 pesos. The President of the Republic and the Bishop were ineligible to serve as electors.

A total of 312 electors were designated under the law, of whom 303 ultimately participated in the presidential election.

== Results ==
Candidate	Votes	%
Jesús Jiménez Zamora	299	98.68
Juan José Ulloa Solares	2	0.66
Cruz Alvarado	1	0.33
José María Castro Madriz	1	0.33
Total	303	100.00
Registered voters/turnout	312	–
Source: TSE

== Aftermath ==
On 1 May 1863, the bicameral Congress formally declared Jesús Jiménez Zamora elected President of the Republic, and the outgoing Executive ratified the declaration on 4 May. He was inaugurated on 8 May 1863. Within three months of taking office, Jiménez dissolved Congress following a dispute over the constitutional incompatibility of certain public offices.
