= José Luis Molina Quesada =

Costa Rican lawyer and politician (1926–2018)

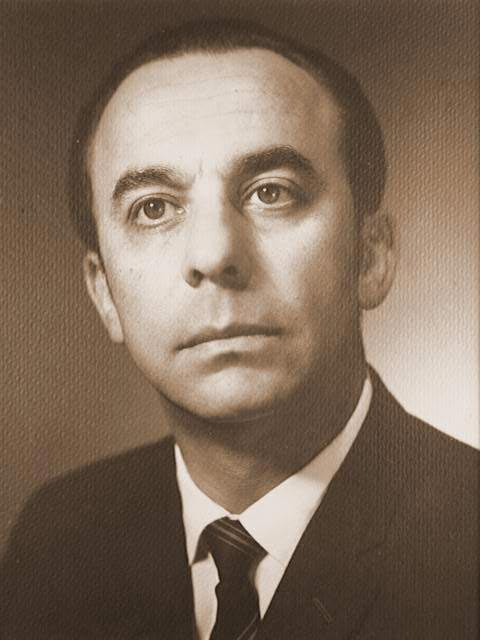
- Molina in 1969

Substitute Magistrate of the Constitutional Chamber
- In office 27 November 1989 – 9 November 2009
- Preceded by: Position established

Permanent Representative to the United Nations
- In office 29 May 1970 – 1973
- President: José Figueres Ferrer
- Preceded by: Luis Dobles Sánchez
- Succeeded by: Fernando Salazar Navarrete

15th President of the Legislative Assembly of Costa Rica
- In office 1 May 1969 – 30 April 1970
- Preceded by: Fernando Volio Jiménez
- Succeeded by: Daniel Oduber Quirós

Deputy of the Legislative Assembly of Costa Rica
- In office 1 May 1966 – 30 April 1970
- Preceded by: Alberto Cañas Escalante
- Succeeded by: Jenaro Valverde Marín
- Constituency: San José (3rd Office)

Personal details
- Born: José Luis Molina Quesada; 23 July 1926 San José, Costa Rica
- Died: 3 April 2018 (aged 91) San José, Costa Rica
- Party: PLN (from 1951)
- Other political affiliations: Social Democratic (1946–1951)
- Education: University of Costa Rica (LLB)

José Luis Molina Quesada (23 July 1926 – 3 April 2018) was a Costa Rican jurist, academic and politician who served as the 15th President of the Legislative Assembly from 1969 to 1970. A member of the National Liberation Party, he later served as Permanent Representative to the United Nations and as a substitute magistrate of the Constitutional Chamber of the Supreme Court of Justice.

== Early life and education ==
Molina was born in San José on 23 July 1926, the son of José Luis Molina Herrera and Carmen Quesada Montes de Oca. He studied law at the University of Costa Rica, where he obtained a law degree and qualified as a notary public in 1952. He subsequently pursued postgraduate studies in Central American legislation and development at the university. In 2009, at the age of 82, he received a doctorate in education from La Salle University.

== Academic career ==
Molina taught at the University of Costa Rica, where he was a professor of Public International Law and Legal Aspects of Public Administration. He also taught Public International Law and Constitutional Law at La Salle University.

His academic work included teaching, supervising undergraduate and graduate theses, and advising students in the fields of law and public administration.

From 1989 to 1990, Molina served as the first director of the Diplomatic Institute of the Ministry of Foreign Affairs of Costa Rica, which was subsequently named after diplomat Manuel María de Peralta y Alfaro.

== Political career ==
Molina became involved in social democratic political and civic organizations while studying at the University of Costa Rica. He participated in the Center for the Study of National Problems, the Social Democratic Party, and subsequently the National Liberation Party.

He was first elected as a substitute deputy to the Legislative Assembly in 1953, serving from until 1958. He returned to the Assembly following the 1966 general election, serving from May 1966 to April 1970. On 1 May 1969, he was elected president of the Legislative Assembly for the final year of that legislative term. During his tenure as president of the Assembly, Molina participated in a mediation commission concerning the conflict between Honduras and El Salvador.

From 1970 to 1973, he served as Costa Rica's Permanent Representative to the United Nations. He had been a member of the board of directors of the Costa Rican Social Security Fund from 1958 to 1965 and again from 1982 to 1984. During his service, he participated in international social security conferences in England, Mexico, and Paraguay.

In November 1989, Molina Quesada was elected by the Legislative Assembly as magistrate of the newly established Constitutional Chamber of the Supreme Court of Justice for the 1989–1993 term. He was subsequently re-elected to the position in 1993, 1997, 2001 and 2005.

== Later life and death ==
He died in San Jose on 3 April 2018 at the age of 91.
