= 1872 Costa Rican general election =

- 2 April 1872
- Presidential election

314 members of the Electoral College 158 votes needed to win
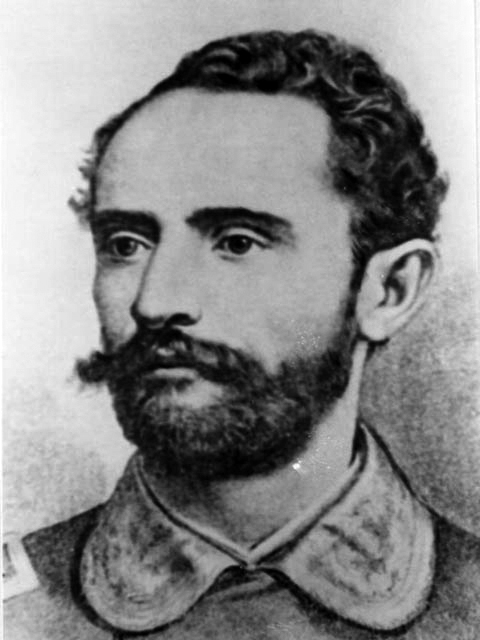
Nominee	Tomás Guardia Gutiérrez
Party	Independent
Electoral vote	311
Percentage	99.04%
President before election
Tomás Guardia Gutiérrez (acting)
Independent
Elected President
Tomás Guardia Gutiérrez
Independent
- Legislative election
- All 21 seats in the Constitutional Congress; 11 seats needed for a majority
Party	Seats	+/–
Independent	21	+21
This lists parties that won seats. See the complete results below.
Results by province

General elections were held in Costa Rica on 2 April 1872 to elect the president and all 21 members of the Constitutional Congress. They were the first elections held under the Constitution of 1871, whose basic electoral framework remained in force until the Costa Rican Civil War, with the exception of the period governed by the Constitution of 1917.

== Background ==
The election followed the political upheaval that began with the overthrow of President Jesús Jiménez Zamora on 27 April 1870. Jiménez, who had returned to power as a dictator and remained in office following the 1869 election, was deposed in a coup supported by elements of the army and the coffee-growing elite. Physician Bruno Carranza Ramírez was installed as "Provisional Head of the Republic" and called elections to a Constituent Convention.

Carranza resigned on 8 August 1870 after disagreements with the commander of the army, Tomás Guardia Gutiérrez, who was subsequently appointed provisional president by the Convention. Relations between Guardia and the Convention soon deteriorated, leading him to dissolve the body. He then promulgated a new electoral law and called elections to a National Constituent Assembly, which drafted and adopted the Constitution of 1871.

== Electoral system ==
Under the Constitution, presidential and legislative elections were conducted through a two-stage electoral system. In the first stage, eligible male citizens elected second-degree electors (electores), who in turn elected the President of the Republic and members of the Constitutional Congress.

Suffrage was extended to Costa Rican men aged 20 or older, or 18 if married or engaged in a recognized profession. The Constitution did not require voters to be literate, and its property qualification was broadly defined, resulting in relatively broad male suffrage for the period. Voting remained public rather than secret. Second-degree electors were required to be at least 21 years old, literate, residents of the province or district they represented, and to possess either an annual income of at least 150 pesos or property valued at 500 pesos or more.

The President was elected for a four-year term and was constitutionally barred from immediate re-election. To be eligible for the presidency, a candidate had to be a Costa Rican citizen by birth, over 30 years of age, possess the qualifications required of an elector, and belong to the secular clergy or lay state.

The election also filled all seats in the Constitutional Congress, with 21 deputies and 14 alternates. Deputies were elected indirectly by the second-degree electors in provincial electoral assemblies using the Hare quota system. Seats were apportioned according to population, generally at a rate of one deputy for every 8,000 inhabitants, with special constitutional representation guaranteed for Guanacaste and the Puntarenas comarca. Half of the deputies chosen in 1872 were selected by lot to serve shortened terms and stand for election again in 1874.

== Results ==
Candidate	Party	Votes	%
Tomás Guardia Gutiérrez	Independent	311	99.04
Gregorio Trejos	Independent	2	0.64
José María Castro Madriz	Independent	1	0.32
Total		314	100.00
Valid votes		314	100.00
Invalid/blank votes		0	0.00
Total votes		314	100.00
Registered voters/turnout		359	87.47
Source: TSE

=== Constitutional Congress ===
Constituency	Independent	
Constituency	%	Seats
San José		5
Alajuela		5
Cartago		5
Heredia		3
Guanacaste		2
Puntarenas		1
Total		21
