= Orfila =

Orfila may refer to:

== Surname ==
- Alejandro Orfila (1925–2021), Argentine diplomat, international functionary, and later winemaker
- Alejandro Orfila (footballer) (born 1976), Uruguayan football manager and former player
- Arnaldo Orfila Reynal (1897–1998), Argentine-Mexican publisher
- Mathieu Orfila (1787–1853), Spanish-French toxicologist and chemist
- Pedro Orfila (born 1988), Spanish footballer

== Second surname ==
- Rodolfo Solano Orfila (1929–1997), Costa Rican economist and politician

== Given name ==
- Orfila Bardesio (1922–2009), Uruguayan poet and educator

== See also ==
- Trupanea orfila, species of fruit fly
- Orfila Vineyards and Winery, in the U.S. state of California
