= 1866 Costa Rican general election =

- 1 April 1866
- Presidential election
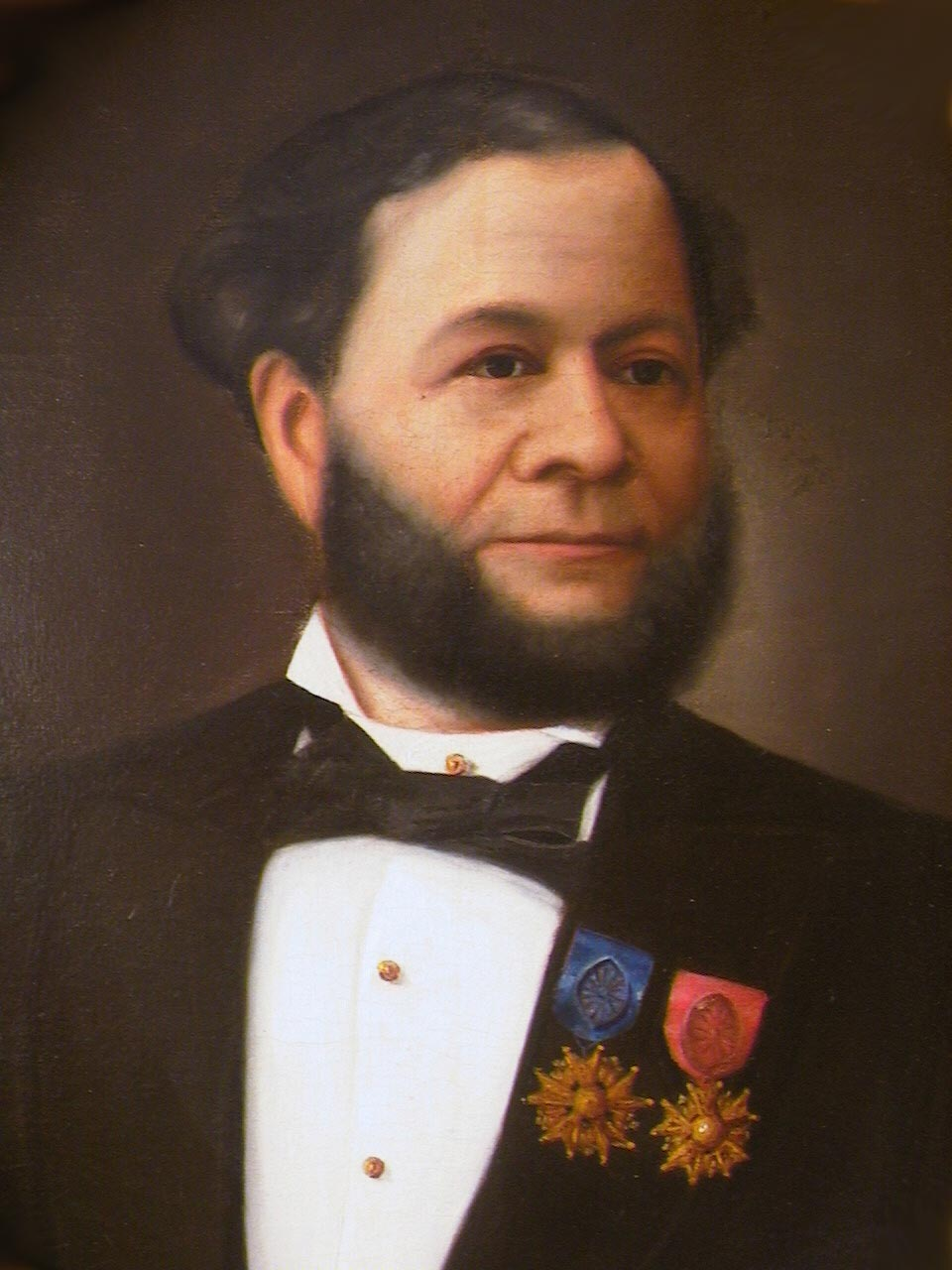

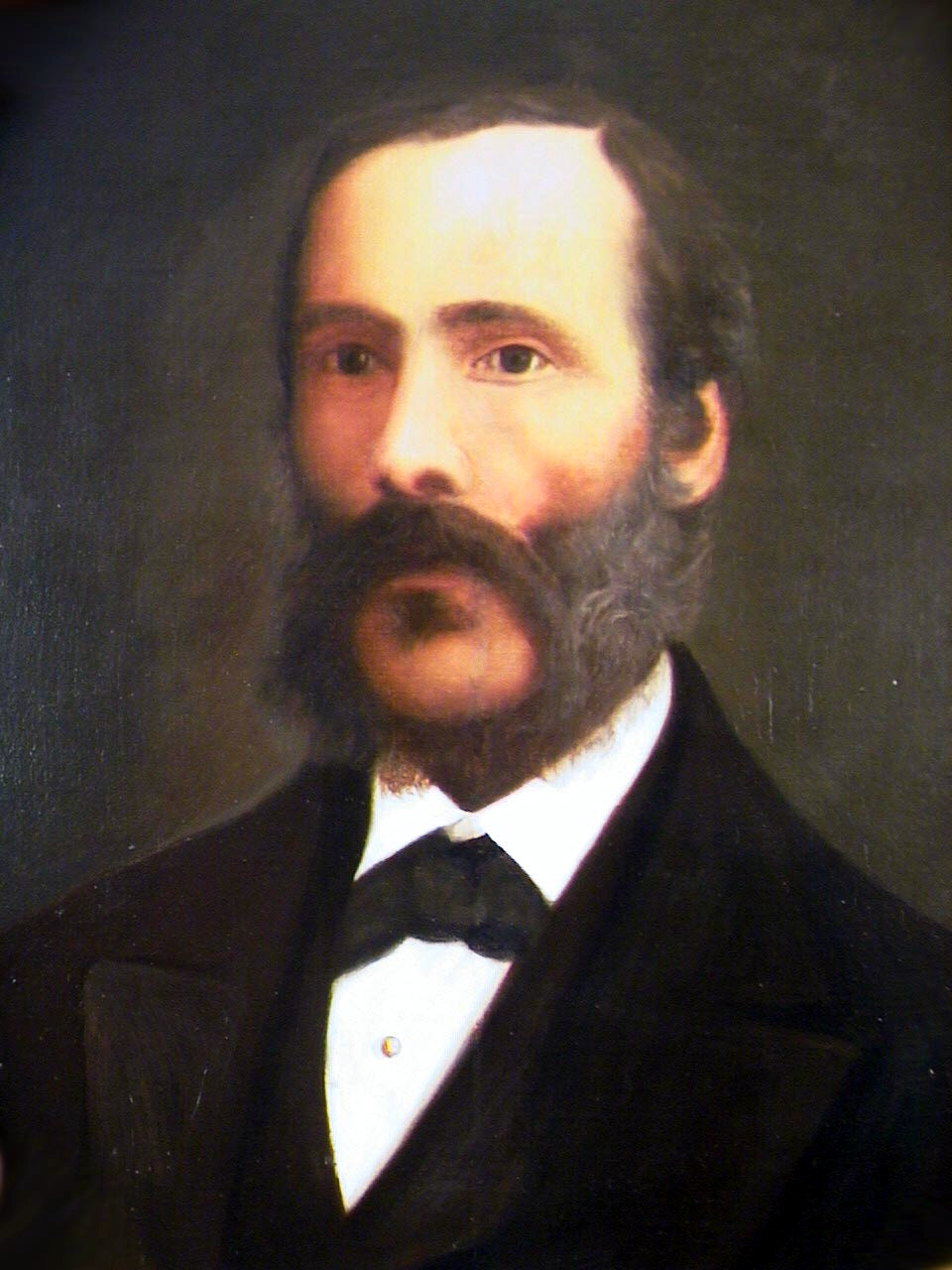
Nominee	José María Castro Madriz	José María Montealegre
Electoral vote	250	2
Percentage	98.43%	0.79%
President before election
Jesús Jiménez Zamora
Elected President
José María Castro Madriz

General elections were held in Costa Rica on 1 April 1866. José María Castro Madriz was elected president of Costa Rica for the 1866-1869 period, which would not finish since in 1868 he was overthrown by his predecessor Jesús Jiménez Zamora. Madriz had previously been president and had been overthrown in his first presidency.

== Results ==
Candidate	Votes	%
José María Castro Madriz	250	98.43
José María Montealegre	2	0.79
Cruz Alvarado	1	0.39
Julián Volio Llorente	1	0.39
Total	254	100.00
Registered voters/turnout	312	–
Source: TSE
