= Alfonso Carro Zúñiga =

Costa Rican lawyer and politician (1924–2015)

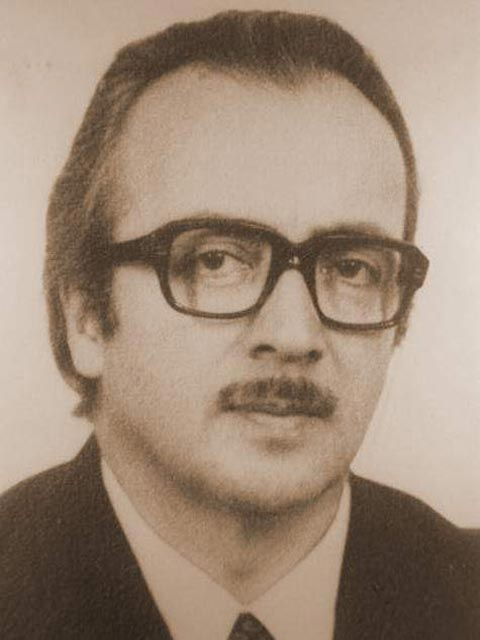
- Carro in 1974

Minister of Interior and Police
- In office 8 May 1982 – 8 May 1986
- President: Luis Alberto Monge

18th President of the Legislative Assembly of Costa Rica
- In office 1 May 1974 – 30 April 1977
- Preceded by: Luis Alberto Monge
- Succeeded by: Elías Soley Soler

Deputy of the Legislative Assembly of Costa Rica
- In office 1 May 1974 – 30 April 1978
- Preceded by: Daniel Oduber Quirós
- Succeeded by: Rodrigo Madrigal Nieto
- Constituency: San José (1st Office)
- In office 1 May 1958 – 30 April 1962
- Succeeded by: Rodolfo Solano Orfila
- Constituency: San José (4th Office)

Personal details
- Born: Alfonso Carro Zúñiga; 16 March 1924 San José, Costa Rica
- Died: 26 July 2015 (aged 91) Montes de Oca, Costa Rica
- Party: PLN
- Education: University of Costa Rica (LLB); Central University of Madrid (LL.D.)

Alfonso Carro Zúñiga (16 March 1924 – 26 July 2015) was a Costa Rican lawyer, academic and politician. A member and ideologue of the National Liberation Party, he served as a deputy in the Legislative Assembly and as its president, and held several positions in the executive branch. He was also a professor at the University of Costa Rica for more than three decades.

== Early life and education ==
Carro Zúñiga was born in Juan Viñas, Cartago, on 16 March 1924, the son of Eduardo Carro Fallas and Cleofe Zúñiga Madriz. He studied law at the University of Costa Rica and subsequently obtained a doctorate in law from the Central University of Madrid.

== Academic career ==
Carro taught at the University of Costa Rica for more than 35 years and served as director of the university's Revista de Ciencias Jurídicas y Sociales (Journal of Legal and Social Sciences). His academic work focused on law, political science, and social and political thought, with particular attention to social democracy.

He was involved in the development of political science as an academic discipline at the University of Costa Rica. With the support of Rector Carlos Monge Alfaro, he participated in efforts to establish a School of Political Science within the Faculty of Law. Other academics involved in these efforts included Rodrigo Madrigal Montealegre, Walter Antillón Montealegre, Rodrigo Fournier Guevara, Eugenio Fonseca Tortós, Benjamín Núñez Vargas, Manuel Formoso Herrera, and Carlos José Gutiérrez, who served as dean of the Faculty of Law.

Following the restructuring of the University of Costa Rica associated with the Third University Congress in 1974, the School of Political Science became part of the Faculty of Social Sciences. Carro published books and articles on legal, political, and social subjects.

== Political and public career ==
Carro was a founding member of the National Liberation Party and signed the party's founding charter at La Paz de San Ramón in 1951. He subsequently participated in party educational and ideological activities and lectured at seminars organized by the party.

In 1978, he organized the Fuerza Verde study group within the National Liberation Party. The group brought together party leaders and advocated reforms concerning the party's internal organization and democratic processes. Its proposals were presented in a document known as the Three Flags manifesto, which called for the establishment of a court of honor, the convening of a party congress, and greater internal democratic organization.

Carro was elected to the Legislative Assembly of Costa Rica for the 1958–1962 and 1974–1978 legislative periods. He served as president of the Legislative Assembly during three consecutive periods, from 1974 to 1975, 1975 to 1976, and 1976 to 1977.

He also held several positions in the executive branch and in public institutions. He served as Minister of Labor and Social Welfare during the administration of President Francisco Orlich Bolmarcich from 1962 to 1966. During his tenure, he was involved in the drafting of legislation establishing the National Learning Institute (INA), which was established by law on 21 May 1965.

In 1966, while serving as Minister of Labor, Carro Zúñiga established a commission to prepare legislation concerning cooperatives. The resulting legislation became the Cooperative Associations Law No. 4179, enacted on 22 August 1968 during the administration of President José Joaquín Trejos Fernández. He also presented legislation concerning a capitalized labor fund and a workers' bank to the Legislative Assembly on 5 May 1966. The initiative preceded the establishment of the Banco Popular y de Desarrollo Comunal.

Carro later served as chairman of the board of directors of the Costa Rican Social Security Fund and of the National Children's Welfare Board (PANI). From 1982 to 1986, he was Minister of the Interior and Police during the administration of President Luis Alberto Monge.

== Later life and death ==
During the 1990s, Carro served as rector of the private De La Salle University in Costa Rica. He continued publishing and participating in academic and political discussions on law, political institutions, and social democracy.

A prize bearing his name, the Alfonso Carro Zúñiga Prize, has been awarded through academic and institutional initiatives involving the Latin American Faculty of Social Sciences (FLACSO), the Central American Institute of Governance, and the Faculty of Law of the University of Costa Rica.

Carro died in Montes de Oca on 26 July 2015, at the age of 91.
