= Minister of Foreign Affairs (Costa Rica) =

This is a list of foreign ministers of Costa Rica.

- 1844............ José María Castro Madriz
- 1844–1846: Joaquín Bernardo Calvo Rosales
- 1846–1847: José María Castro Madriz
- 1847–1856: Joaquín Bernardo Calvo Rosales
- 1856–1857: Lorenzo Montúfar y Rivera
- 1857–1859: José Nazario Toledo
- 1859............ José María Castro Madriz
- 1859–1860: Jesús Jiménez Zamora
- 1861–1863: Francisco María Iglesias Llorente
- 1863–1868: Julián Volio Llorente
- 1868–1869: Aniceto Esquivel Sáenz
- 1869............ Juan Rafael Mata Lafuente
- 1869–1870: Agapito Jiménez Zamora
- 1870–1873: Lorenzo Montúfar y Rivera
- 1873............ José María Castro Madriz
- 1873–1874: Luis Diego Sáenz Carazo
- 1874–1875: Salvador Jiménez Blanco
- 1876............ Juan Rafael Mata Lafuente
- 1876............ Saturnino Lizano Gutiérrez
- 1876–1877: Rafael Machado y Jáuregui
- 1877–1883: José María Castro Madriz
- 1883............ Eusebio Figueroa Oreamuno
- 1883–1885: José María Castro Madriz
- 1885–1886: Ascensión Esquivel Ibarra
- 1886............ José Joaquín Rodríguez Zeledón
- 1887–1888: Ascensión Esquivel Ibarra
- 1888............ Pedro Pérez Zeledón
- 1888–1889: Manuel de Jesús Jiménez Oreamuno
- 1889............ Cleto González Víquez
- 1889............ Ezequiel Gutiérrez Iglesias
- 1889–1890: Ricardo Jiménez Oreamuno
- 1890–1891: Ezequiel Gutiérrez Iglesias
- 1891–1892: Pedro María de León-Páez Brown
- 1892............ Pedro Pérez Zeledón
- 1892–1894: Manuel Vicente Jiménez Oreamuno
- 1894–1898: Ricardo Pacheco Marchena
- 1898–1899: Pedro Pérez Zeledón
- 1902–1905: Leonidas Pacheco Cabezas
- 1906–1908: Luis Anderson Morúa
- 1909–1910: Ricardo Fernández Guardia
- 1910–1913: Manuel Castro Quesada
- 1914–1915: Manuel Castro Quesada
- 1915–1917: Julio Acosta García
- 1917–1918: Carlos Lara Iraeta
- 1918–1919: Tobías Zúñiga Montúfar
- 1919............ Guillermo Vargas Calvo
- 1919–1920: Andrés Venegas García
- 1920–1922: Alejandro Alvarado Quirós
- 1922............ José Andrés Coronado Alvarado
- 1924–1927: Juan Rafael Argüello De Vars
- 1927–1928: Ricardo Castro Béeche
- 1928–1929: Rafael Castro Quesada
- 1929–1930: Roberto Eustaquio Smyth Pumarejo
- 1930–1931: Octavio Béeche Argüello
- 1931–1934: Leonidas Pacheco Cabezas
- 1934–1936: Raúl Gurdián Rojas
- 1936–1937: Manuel Francisco Jiménez Ortiz
- 1937–1940: Tobías Zúñiga Montúfar
- 1940–1944: Alberto Echandi Montero
- 1944–1948: Julio Acosta García
- 1948............ José Figueres Ferrer
- 1948–1949: Benjamín Odio Odio
- 1949............ Gerardo Fernández Durán
- 1949–1950: Ricardo Toledo Escalante
- 1950–1952: Mario Echandi Jiménez
- 1952–1953: Fernando Lara Bustamante
- 1953–1956: Mario A. Esquivel Arguedas
- 1956–1957: Fernando Volio Sancho
- 1957–1958: Mario Gómez Calvo
- 1958–1962: Alfredo Vargas Fernández
- 1962–1964: Daniel Oduber Quirós
- 1965–1966: Mario Gómez Calvo
- 1966–1970: Fernando Lara Bustamante
- 1970–1976: Gonzalo Facio Segreda
- 1976–1977: Wilburg Jiménez Castro (acting)
- 1977–1978: Gonzalo Facio Segreda
- 1978–1980: Rafael Ángel Calderón Fournier
- 1980–1982: Bernd H. Niehaus Quesada
- 1982–1983: Fernando Volio Jiménez
- 1983............ Armando Arauz Aguilar (acting)
- 1984–1986: Carlos José Gutiérrez Gutiérrez
- 1986–1990: Rodrigo Madrigal Nieto
- 1990–1994: Bernd H. Niehaus Quesada
- 1994–1998: Fernando Naranjo Villalobos
- 1998–2002: Roberto Rojas López
- 2002–2006: Roberto Tovar Faja
- 2006–2010: Bruno Stagno Ugarte
- 2010–2011: René Castro
- 2011............ Carlos Roverssi (acting)
- 2011–2014: Enrique Castillo
- 2014–2018: Manuel González Sanz
- 2018............ Epsy Campbell Barr
- 2018–2019: Lorena Aguilar Revelo (acting)
- 2019–2020: Manuel Ventura
- 2020–2022: Rodolfo Solano
- 2022–2026: Arnoldo André Tinoco
- 2026............ Manuel Tovar Rivera
- 2026–present: Ana Elena Pinto

== Sources ==
- Rulers.org – Foreign ministers A–D
