= Rose Marie Karpinsky Dodero =

Costa Rican academic and politician (born 1936)

Rose Marie Karpinsky
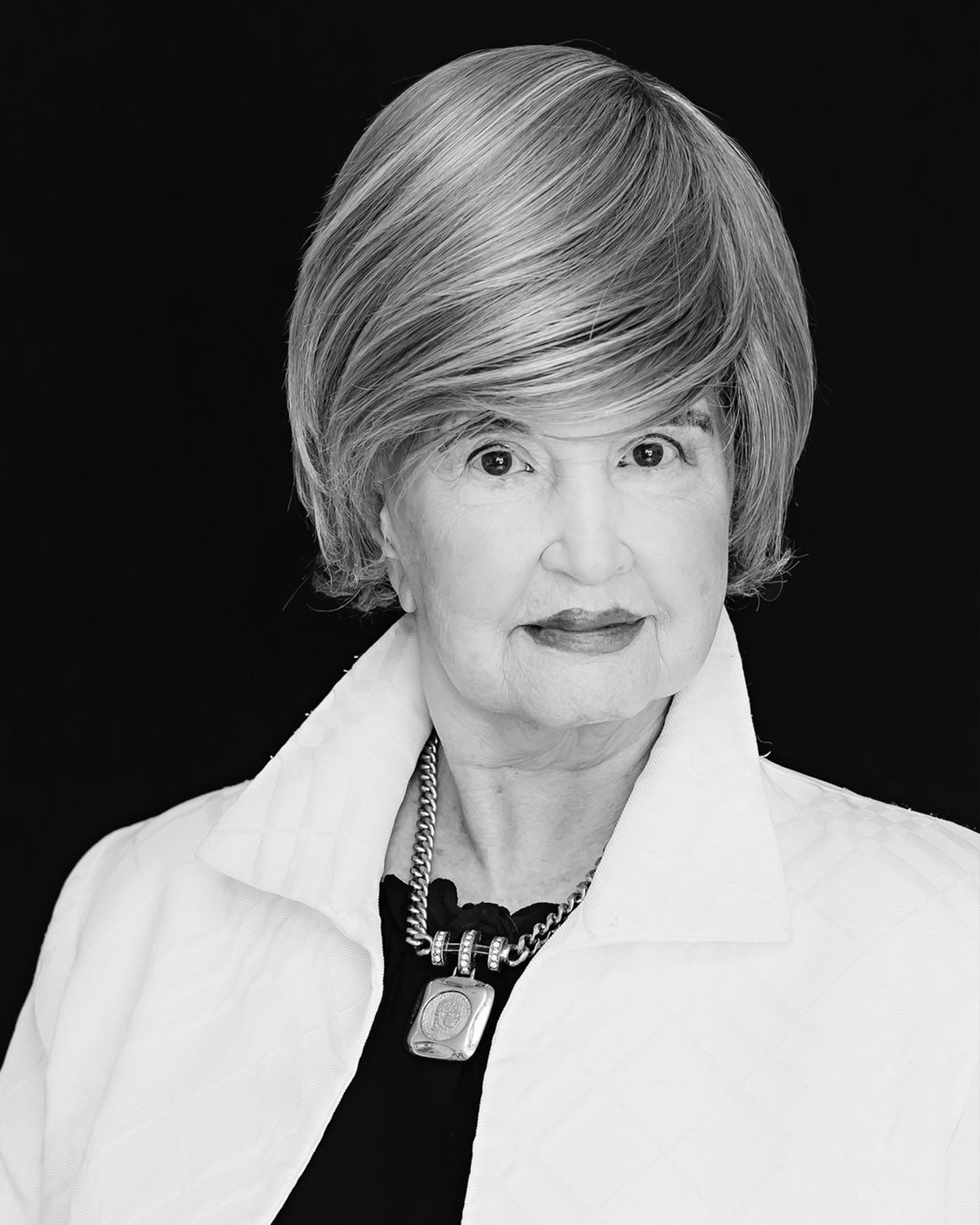
- Portrait, c. 2021

Ambassador of Costa Rica to the Holy See
- In office 1996–1997
- President: José María Figueres Olsen

Ambassador of Costa Rica to Spain
- In office 1994–1997
- President: José María Figueres Olsen
- Succeeded by: Javier Solís Herrera

28th President of the Legislative Assembly of Costa Rica
- In office 1 May 1986 – 30 April 1987
- Preceded by: Guillermo Vargas Sanabria
- Succeeded by: Fernando Volio Jiménez

Deputy of the Legislative Assembly of Costa Rica
- In office 1 May 1986 – 30 April 1990
- Preceded by: Bernal Jiménez Monge
- Succeeded by: Rolando Laclé Castro
- Constituency: San José (3rd Office)

Ambassador of Costa Rica to Israel
- In office 1974–1975
- President: Daniel Oduber Quirós

Personal details
- Born: Rose Marie Karpinsky Dodero; 24 October 1936 (age 89) San José, Costa Rica
- Party: PLN
- Spouse: Fernando Murillo Bonilla (m. 1953; died 2023)
- Education: University of Costa Rica (PhD)
- Occupation: Philosopher; politician; professor; diplomat

Rose Marie Karpinsky Dodero (born 24 October 1936) is a Costa Rican philosopher, academic, diplomat and retired politician. A member of the National Liberation Party, she served as the 28th President of the Legislative Assembly from 1986 to 1987, the first woman to hold the office.

== Early life and education ==
Karpinsky was born in San José on 24 October 1936, the daughter of Alejandro Karpinsky Heintze and Consuelo Dodero Araya. She spent part of her childhood in San José and Limón, where she attended the Limón Girls' School and began her secondary education at the American School of Limón. She completed her secondary education at the Our Lady of Sion School in San José.

She subsequently studied humanities and philosophy at the University of Costa Rica. In 1957, before completing her degree, she began teaching in the university's School of General Studies. She later served as director of the school between 1980 and 1986, the first woman to hold the position. In 1973, Karpinsky earned a doctorate in philosophy from the University of Costa Rica. Her doctoral thesis examined the concept of revolution in history.

Karpinsky was a professor at the School of General Studies at the University of Costa Rica from 1957 until 1990. Her academic work focused on the humanities, and she also held administrative responsibilities within the university.

In 1973, Karpinsky was invited by president José Figueres Ferrer to participate in an ad hoc commission involved in the organization of the National University of Costa Rica. She was the only woman on the commission.

== Political and diplomatic career ==
Karpinsky Dodero entered the Costa Rican diplomatic service during the administration of President Daniel Oduber Quirós. From 1974 to 1975, she served as ambassador to Israel, with residence in Jerusalem. She later served as ambassador to Spain from 1994 to 1998. During that period, she also represented the country in several diplomatic capacities, including as ambassador to Morocco in 1996, accredited to the Sovereign Military Order of Malta, and as ambassador to the Holy See from December 1996 to 1997.

In the 1986 general election, Karpinsky was elected to the Legislative Assembly under the National Liberation Party. During her parliamentary career, she chaired the Committee on Economic Affairs, a position that had traditionally been held by men. On 1 May 1986, she was elected president of the Legislative Assembly for the 1986–1987 legislative year, becoming the first woman to preside over the Costa Rican legislature.

In 1998, she was selected as a vice-presidential candidate on the ticket of José Miguel Corrales, the presidential candidate of the PLN. Corrales and Karpinsky Dodero were unsuccessful in the election, obtaining 44.5% of the vote.

After the 1998 electoral campaign, Karpinsky withdrew from active partisan politics. She subsequently established a course on current affairs at the Country Club in San José.
