= Agapito Jiménez Zamora =

Costa Rican businessman and politician (1817–1879)

Second Designate to the Presidency
- In office 8 May 1869 – 27 April 1870
- President: Jesús Jiménez Zamora
- Preceded by: Francisco María Yglesias Llorente
- Succeeded by: Rafael Barroeta Baca (1872)

Secretary of Foreign Affairs (Note: Simultaneously in charge of the portfolios of Public Instruction and Charity.)
- In office 31 May 1869 – 27 April 1870
- President: Jesús Jiménez Zamora
- Preceded by: Juan Rafael Mata Lafuente
- Succeeded by: Lorenzo Montúfar y Rivera

First Designate to the Presidency
- In office 8 May 1863 – 8 May 1864
- President: Jesús Jiménez Zamora
- Preceded by: Julián Volio Llorente
- Succeeded by: José María Castro Madriz

Personal details
- Born: Agapito Jiménez Zamora; 24 May 1817 Cartago, Captaincy General of Guatemala, Spanish Empire
- Died: 17 September 1879 (aged 62) San José, Costa Rica
- Party: Independent

Agapito Jiménez Zamora (24 May 1817 – 17 September 1879) was a Costa Rican businessman and politician.

He was an alternate member of the House of Representatives (1844–1846) and the Constituent Assembly of 1846–1847, deputy substitute for Carthage (1848–1849), Deputy owner by Carthage (1849–1852), Minister Conjuez of the Supreme Court of Justice of Costa Rica (1858–1859), alternate member for San José in the House of Representatives (1860–1862), he was First Designate to the Presidency (1863–1864), and was appointed a second time for the Presidency (1869–1870) and Governor of the Province of San José (May 1869).

His brother was Jesús Jiménez Zamora at the time the president of Costa Rica and his nephew was Ricardo Jimenez Oreamuno, three times president of Costa Rica. Through her grandchildren Emilia Jimenez Salvatierra and Federico Jimenez Salvatierra and four generations down was born Luis Amador Jiménez, former minister of Public Works and Transportation of Costa Rica 2022-24 o
