= 1869 Costa Rican general election =

- 27 March 1869
- Presidential election

348 members of the Electoral College 175 votes needed to win
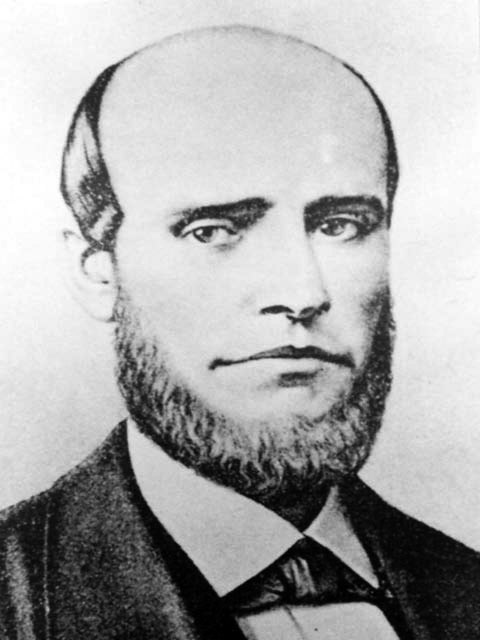
Nominee	Jesús Jiménez Zamora
Party	Independent
Electoral vote	345
Percentage	99.14%
President before election
Jesús Jiménez Zamora
Independent
Elected President
Jesús Jiménez Zamora
Independent

General elections were held in Costa Rica on 27 March 1869 to elect the president for a three-year term. They were the first and only elections conducted under the 1869 Constitution. Following the 1868 coup d'état that overthrew José María Castro Madriz before the end of his constitutional term, former president Jesús Jiménez Zamora returned to power as provisional president. After declaring the 1859 Constitution void and dissolving Congress, he convened a Constituent Assembly, which drafted the new constitution and called presidential elections. Jiménez was the sole candidate and was elected to a full constitutional term.

The 1869 Constitution retained the existing two-stage indirect electoral system. Male citizens voted in the first stage before electoral boards to choose electors, which then chose the president and the legislature through provincial electoral assemblies. Electors were required to be male citizens aged at least 21, literate, resident in the province where they were elected, and to meet specified property or income qualifications. Presidential terms remained at three years, with immediate re-election prohibited.

== Results ==
Candidate	Party	Votes	%
Jesús Jiménez Zamora	Independent	345	99.14
Eusebio Figueroa Oreamuno	Independent	1	0.29
José María Montealegre	Independent	1	0.29
Julián Volio Llorente	Independent	1	0.29
Total		348	100.00
Valid votes		348	100.00
Invalid/blank votes		0	0.00
Total votes		348	100.00
Registered voters/turnout		358	97.21
Source: TSE
