= Mike Carman (lawyer) =

Michael R. Carman (died May 6, 2009) was a Canadian lawyer who specialized in structured finance. He was a partner with the a corporate law firm Stikeman Elliott since 1992. Carman was recognized as Canada's top lawyer in his field, and as one of the 25 leading structured finance lawyers in the world. The Canadian LEXPERT legal directory listed Carman as the most frequently recommended lawyer in the fields of derivatives and securitization.

== Background ==
Carman was called to the Ontario Bar in 1984. He graduated from York University with a Bachelor of Arts in 1975, and received his Bachelor of Laws from the University of Western Ontario in 1982.

Carman died on May 6, 2009, after a long battle with cancer.

== Legacy ==
The 'Michael R. Carman Field House and Batting Cage' at Kirkey Field in Pickering, Ontario is named in his honour.
