= Costa Rican Constitution of 1869 =

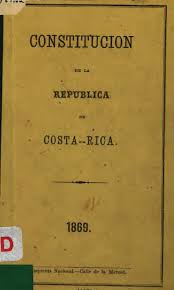
Cover of the text at National Museum.

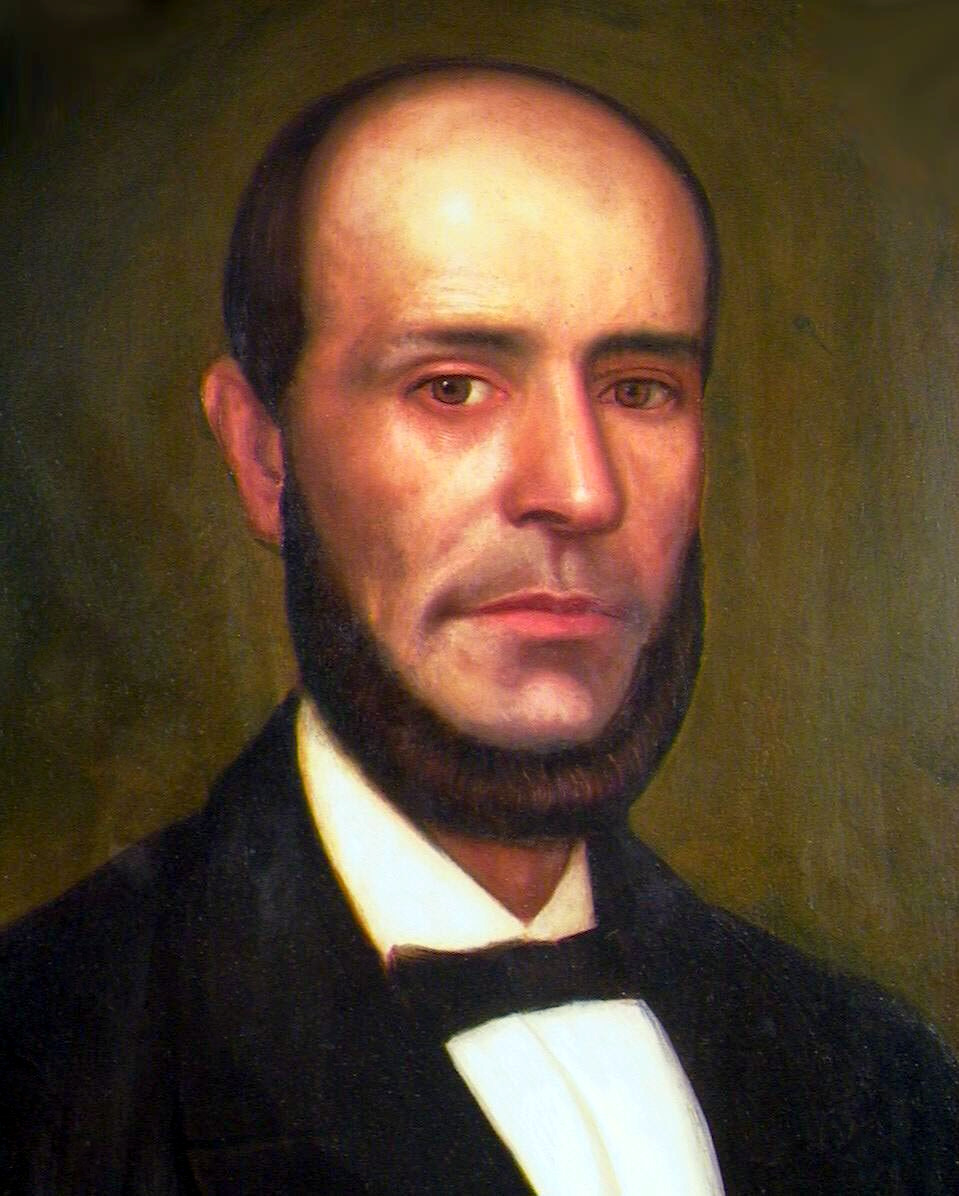
Jesús Jiménez Zamora.

The Costa Rican Constitution of 1869 was the Constitution of Costa Rica for two years, between 1869 and 1871.

== History ==
On 1 November 1868, Jesús Jiménez Zamora became provisional president by proclamation. On 3 November, Jiménez called elections for a Constituent Assembly, which began its sessions on 1 January 1869, under the presidency of Juan José Ulloa Solares. A commission launched the project for the new Constitution, using the Constitution of 1859 as a model. The commission made only a few slight adjustments and additions. The new Fundamental Charter was approved by the constituent body on 18 February 1869, eiywith effect on 18 April.

Under the Constitution of 1869, president Jiménez Zamora was popularly elected as constitutional president for the period 1869 to 1872. However, the validity of the new Charter ended on 27 April 1870, when President Jiménez was overthrown by a military coup and the constitutional order was dismissed yet again.

== Content ==
The Political Constitution of 1869 consisted of 149 articles in thirteen titles.

- Title I dealt with the Republic, declaring that sovereignty resided in the nation and defined its borders.
- Title II dealt with the government, indicated its characteristics and enunciated the tripartite division of responsibilities.
- Title III said that the official religion was Catholicism, that it was protected by the Government and that it did not contribute to the expenses of another worship, whose exercise, however, was to be tolerated.
- Title IV related to education, and declared that primary education of both sexes was compulsory, free and paid for by the State.
- Title V referred to national and individual guarantees and repeated almost verbatim the Constitution of 1859.
- Title VI contained the regulation of nationality and citizenship.
- Title VII referred to suffrage, which was exercised through an indirect system in two grades. The second degree was censitario and excluded priests.
- Titles VIII and IX regulated the Legislative and the Executive branches respectively, practically in the same terms as in the previous Constitution. An important change with respect to the Council of State, formed by the Secretaries of State and the Presidents of both Houses, indicating that their opinion was purely advisory and should be provided in writing.
- Title X regulated various aspects of the administration of justice, almost identical to the Constitution of 1859. One important innovation ordered that by an absolute majority of votes the Supreme Court of Justice could suspend, by itself, at the request of the Prosecutor or any citizen, the enforcement of laws that were contrary to the Constitution, and submit their observations on the matter to the Congress at its next ordinary meeting, so that it could be definitively resolved.
- Title XI dealt with the Public Prosecutor's Office, headed by a General Prosecutor appointed by Congress for a two-year term and with the possibility of being re-appointed. The prosecutor was responsible for ensuring that public officials performed their duties properly.
- Title XII dealt with the municipal regime and reproduced the provisions of the Constitution of 1859 on political division, provincial governors and municipalities.
- Title XIII referred to the observance of the Constitution and reforms to the fundamental Charter. At the beginning of ordinary sessions, the Legislative branch had to examine whether the Constitution had been exactly observed and provide what was convenient to enforce the responsibility of offenders. For the partial reform of the Constitution a project could be presented in any of the chambers, signed by at least one third of the members present, and then had to be approved by two thirds of votes in each of the Chambers and by an absolute majority of the Congress. The project then went to the Executive, who after having heard the Council of State, presented it with its annual message to the Congress at the next ordinary meeting of the latter. Congress then had to approve again the modification by two thirds of votes. It could also proceed to reform the Constitution by unanimous initiative of the Municipalities of the Republic. For the general reform of the Constitution it was necessary to convene a Constituent Assembly, after the respective project followed the procedures of partial reform.
