= Rodolfo Solano Orfila =

Costa Rican economist and politician (1929–1997)

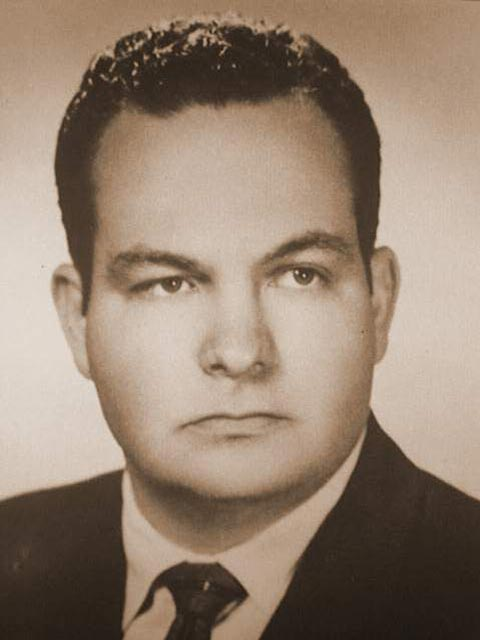
- Solano in 1964

10th President of the Legislative Assembly of Costa Rica
- In office 1 May 1964 – 30 April 1965
- Preceded by: Rafael París Steffens
- Succeeded by: Rafael París Steffens

Deputy of the Legislative Assembly of Costa Rica
- In office 1 May 1962 – 30 April 1966
- Preceded by: Alfonso Carro Zúñiga
- Succeeded by: Matilde Marín Chinchilla
- Constituency: San José (4th Office)

Personal details
- Born: Rodolfo Solano Orfila; 21 May 1929 San José, Costa Rica
- Died: 27 September 1997 (aged 68) San José, Costa Rica
- Party: PLN
- Education: University of Costa Rica (BA)

Rodolfo Solano Orfila (Note: In this name that follows Hispanic American naming customs, the first or paternal surname is Solano and the second or maternal family name is Orfila.) (21 May 1929 – 27 September 1997) was a Costa Rican economist and politician who served as the 10th President of the Legislative Assembly from 1964 to 1965. A member of the National Liberation Party, he served as a deputy from 1962 to 1966. He subsequently held positions in public administration, regional economic integration, and state banking.

Solano was a member of the board of directors of the Banco Nacional de Costa Rica between 1994 and 1997, where he served as its president in 1995. His professional interests included Central American economic integration, public finance, and the role of the state in economic development.

== Biography ==
Solano was born in San José on 21 May 1929, the son of Roberto Solano Alvarado and Luz Orfila. He studied economics at the University of Costa Rica and pursued further studies in the United States and in Brazil, where he specialized in public finance and budgeting.

Solano began his professional career in public administration. He worked in Costa Rica's Direct Taxation administration and later served as administrative chief of the Ministry of Public Works and as head of the National Budget Office. He also participated in international conferences and activities related to economic development and regional integration. In 1969, he served as director of the joint SIECA–BCIE program. In December 1972, he was the Costa Rican delegate at the "First Meeting on Improvement and Restructuring of the Central American Common Market", held in Guatemala City.

Solano was active in the National Liberation Party and was elected to the Legislative Assembly in the 1962 general election, representing San José. He served as a deputy during the 1962–1966 legislative period and chaired the Committee on Economic Affairs. On 1 May 1964, he was elected president of the Legislative Assembly for the 1964–1965 legislative year.

Solano returned to public service through the state banking sector. He became a member of the board of directors of the Banco Nacional de Costa Rica in 1994 and served as its president in 1995. He remained a member of the board until his death in 1997.

In 1995, his participation in a meeting organized by the National Liberation Party led to proceedings before the Supreme Electoral Court concerning the statutory prohibition on political-electoral activities by members of the boards of state banks. In its 1996 ruling, the Court found that his attendance at the political meeting constituted a violation of the applicable prohibition and imposed a two-year disqualification from holding public office.

Solano died on 27 September 1997 at the age of 68 after suffering cardiac arrest while at the Cine Magaly in San José.
