= Bernd H. Niehaus Quesada =

Costa Rican jurist, academic and diplomat (born 1941)

Bernd Niehaus Quesada

President of the International Law Commission
- In office 6 May 2013 – 6 May 2014
- Preceded by: Lucius Caflisch
- Succeeded by: Kirill Gevorgian

Ambassador of Costa Rica to Germany
- In office 8 May 2002 – 8 May 2010
- President: Abel Pacheco de la Espriella; Óscar Arias Sánchez
- Preceded by: Rafael Ángel Herra Rodríguez
- Succeeded by: José Joaquín Chaverri Sievert

Permanent Representative to the United Nations
- In office 8 May 1998 – 8 May 2002
- President: Miguel Ángel Rodríguez
- Preceded by: Fernando Berrocal Soto
- Succeeded by: Bruno Stagno Ugarte

Minister of Foreign Affairs and Worship
- In office 8 May 1990 – 8 May 1994
- President: Rafael Ángel Calderón Fournier
- Preceded by: Rodrigo Madrigal Nieto
- Succeeded by: Fernando Naranjo Villalobos
- In office 1 August 1980 – 8 May 1982
- President: Rodrigo Carazo Odio
- Preceded by: Rafael Ángel Calderón Fournier
- Succeeded by: Fernando Volio Jiménez

Personal details
- Born: Bernd H. Niehaus Quesada; 14 April 1941 (age 85) San José, Costa Rica
- Party: PUSC (from 1983)
- Other political affiliations: Unity Coalition
- Education: University of Costa Rica (LLB); University of Strasbourg (PhD)

Bernd H. Niehaus Quesada (born 14 April 1941) is a Costa Rican jurist, academic and retired diplomat who served as Minister of Foreign Affairs from 1980 to 1982 and from 1990 to 1994. He also served as Costa Rica's permanent representative to the United Nations from 1998 to 2002, and as a member of the International Law Commission between 2002 and 2016. He was also Costa Rica's ambassador to Germany from 2002 to 2010.

== Early life and education ==
Niehaus was born in San José on 14 April 1941, as the son of Hans Niehaus Ahrens and Fanny Quesada Córdoba. His family is partly German, and is a citizen of both countries. He received his primary and secondary education at the private Colegio Seminario in San José. He married Gabriela Meinert Daeweritz in 1966 and is the father of two sons, Jens and Dirk Niehaus Meinert.

He studied law at the University of Bonn in West Germany from 1959 to 1960 and subsequently studied economics and political science at the universities of Bonn, Hamburg, and Cologne from 1960 to 1966, obtaining a degree in those fields.

Niehaus later studied law at the University of Costa Rica, where he obtained his law degree in 1972. At the University of Strasbourg in France, he obtained a postgraduate diploma in international law in 1973 and a doctorate in international law in 1994. He also obtained a diploma in international and comparative human rights law from the René Cassin Institute in Strasbourg in 1973. In 1981, he received an honorary doctorate from the Universidad Central del Este in the Dominican Republic.

== Career ==
Niehaus began his professional career as cultural attaché at the Costa Rican embassy in Bonn, serving from 1963 to 1966. He later pursued an academic career in Costa Rica. From 1974, he was a professor of private and public international law at the University of Costa Rica. He also taught international private and public law at the School of International Relations of the National University of Costa Rica from 1975 to 1976. He continued as a professor at the University of Costa Rica's Faculty of Law through 2010.

Niehaus served as Vice-Minister of Foreign Affairs of Costa Rica from 1978 to 1980. He became Minister of Foreign Affairs and Worship in 1980 and held the position until 1982. He returned to the ministry in 1990 and served again as foreign minister until 1994. In 1994, Niehaus was a candidate for Secretary General of the Organization of American States.

He served as Costa Rican ambassador to the United Nations from 1998 to 2002. He also served as vice-president of the United Nations Economic and Social Council in 2000 and 2001. Niehaus served as Costa Rica's ambassador to Germany from 2002 to 2010. He was also accredited as ambassador to Hungary and the Czech Republic from 2004 to 2010 and served as ambassador to Poland from 2003 to 2005.

Niehaus was a member of the International Law Commission between 2002 and 2016, and chaired the organization from 2013 to 2014.
