= Francisco María Yglesias Llorente =

Costa Rican politician and historian (1825–1903)

Francisco María Yglesias
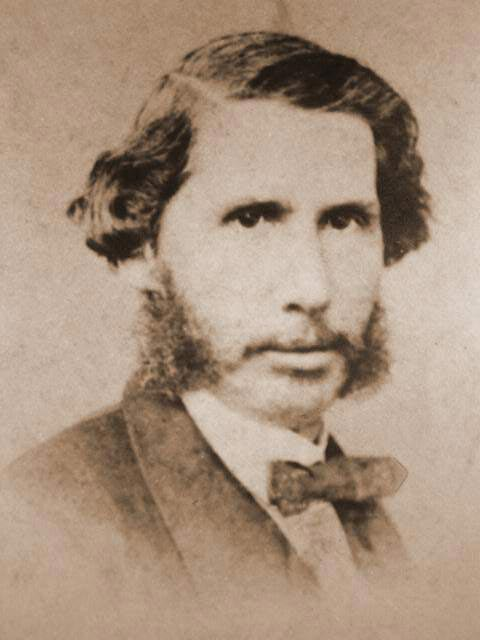

President of the Constitutional Congress
- In office 1 May 1900 – 30 April 1903
- Preceded by: Pedro León-Páez y Brown
- Succeeded by: Ricardo Jiménez Oreamuno
- In office 1 May 1890 – 30 April 1892
- Preceded by: Manuel Aragón Quesada
- Succeeded by: Carlos Durán Cartín

Deputy of the Constitutional Congress
- In office 1 May 1900 – 8 November 1903
- Constituency: San José Province
- In office 1 May 1890 – 31 August 1892
- Constituency: San José Province

Director of the National Archives
- In office 16 October 1883 – March 1888
- President: Próspero Fernández Oreamuno; Bernardo Soto Alfaro; Carlos Durán Cartín (acting)
- Preceded by: León Fernández Bonilla
- Succeeded by: Francisco Serrano y Leitón

Second Designate to the Presidency
- In office 8 May 1868 – 1 November 1868
- President: José María Castro Madriz
- Preceded by: Manuel Antonio Bonilla Nava
- Succeeded by: Agapito Jiménez Zamora

Secretary of Foreign Affairs (Note: Simultaneously in charge of the portfolios of Public Instruction and Charity.)
- In office 1861 – 8 May 1863
- President: José María Montealegre
- Preceded by: Jesús Jiménez Zamora
- Succeeded by: Julián Volio Llorente

Personal details
- Born: Francisco María Yglesias Llorente; 28 October 1825 Cartago, Costa Rica, Federal Republic of Central America
- Died: 8 November 1903 (aged 78) San José, Costa Rica

Francisco María Yglesias Llorente (28 October 1825 – 8 November 1903) was a Costa Rican lawyer, historian and statesman who served as President of the Constitutional Congress from 1890 to 1892 and from 1900 to 1903. He also served as Secretary of Foreign Affairs and Public Instruction from 1861 to 1863 and as Financial Commissioner to the United Kingdom between 1873 and 1877.

== Biography ==
Yglesias was born in Cartago on 28 October 1825, the son of politician Joaquín de Yglesias and Petronila Llorente y Lafuente, sister of Anselmo Llorente y Lafuente, the first Bishop of Costa Rica. He married his niece, Enriqueta Tinoco Yglesias, in San José on 4 October 1878.

He earned a Bachelor of Laws degree from the University of Santo Tomás in Costa Rica and later pursued further legal studies at the University of San Pablo in Seville. In 1850, he served as interim rector of the University of Santo Tomás.

Yglesias entered public life as a deputy representing San José between 1852 and 1856. In 1856, he became involved in a conspiracy against President Juan Rafael Mora Porras and was forced into exile. Following Mora's overthrow in 1859, he returned to Costa Rica and was appointed Secretary of Foreign Affairs and Public Instruction, serving from 1861 to 1863.

He subsequently served as President of the Chamber of Representatives from 1863 to 1867, President of the Senate in 1868, and as was elected as a member of the Constituent Assembly of 1871. He later held the office of Secretary of the Interior and related portfolios.

From 1873 to 1877, Yglesias served in the United Kingdom as Costa Rica's financial commissioner. Upon his return, he was appointed director of the National Archives, a position he held from 1883 to 1888.

In 1890, he was elected deputy for San José and chosen as President of the Constitutional Congress, serving until 1892. He returned to both offices in 1900 and remained in them until his death.

Alongside his political career, Yglesias was an important historian. His principal works include Pro Patria, a series that included a biography of his father, Documentos después de la Independencia (1899–1903), and Réplica al pabellón: Comprobaciones históricas del licenciado don Rafael Montúfar (1899). He also published numerous speeches, official documents, and historical essays. In 1891, he was appointed a corresponding member of the Royal Spanish Academy.

Yglesias died in San José on 8 November 1903 while serving in the Constitutional Congress.
