= 1871 Costa Rican Constituent Assembly election =

- 15–17 September 1871 (popular vote); 8 October 1871 (electoral college)
- All 21 seats in the National Constituent Assembly; 12 seats needed for a majority
Party	Seats	+/–
Independents	21	New
This lists parties that won seats. See the complete results below.
Results by province

Constituent Assembly elections were held in Costa Rica between 15 and 17 September 1871 to elect 21 constituent deputies and 10 alternate members tasked with drafting a new constitution. The elections were called by provisional President Tomás Guardia Gutiérrez after he had dissolved the previous Constituent Convention on 10 August 1870. The resulting assembly drafted the 1871 Constitution, which became the longest-lasting constitution in Costa Rican history until its replacement in 1949, although it was suspended during several periods.

== Background ==
The elections followed a period of political instability that began after the 1870 coup against President Jesús Jiménez Zamora. Provisional President Bruno Carranza Ramírez convened a Constituent Convention, which began its sessions on 8 August 1870. However, Carranza resigned shortly afterward following disagreements with General Tomás Guardia, then commander of the army. Guardia was subsequently appointed provisional president by the Convention.

Relations between Guardia and the Convention quickly deteriorated, and he dissolved the body and called new elections for a Constituent Assembly under a revised electoral law.

== Electoral system ==
The election was conducted under the electoral framework established by Decree No. 31 of 12 August 1871. The decree was heavily based on the electoral law issued by Carranza's provisional government in 1870 but introduced several modifications. Unlike the previous electoral law, Guardia's decree removed property and income qualifications and allowed members of the secular clergy, military, and judiciary to vote and stand for election. Suffrage was limited to literate male citizens over 25 years of age who were residents of the province in which they voted.

The election was conducted in two stages. In the first stage, voters elected electoral delegates (electores) at the district level. Each district elected three electors and one alternate for every 2,000 inhabitants; districts below that threshold were guaranteed a minimum representation of three electors and one alternate. A total of 173 electors were to be appointed nationwide, distributed as follows: San José (54), Alajuela (39), Cartago (33), Heredia (26), Guanacaste (14), and Puntarenas (7).

The first-stage elections were to be held from 15 to 17 September. Provincial electoral boards would review the results between 20 and 25 September, and the provincial electoral assemblies would meet on 8 October to elect the constituent deputies and their alternates. The president, members of the Council of State (cabinet secretaries), and the bishop were prohibited from serving as electors or members of the Constituent Assembly.

== Aftermath ==
The Constituent Assembly was installed at the National Palace in San José on 15 October 1871. It completed its work on 7 December after drafting and approving a new constitution. The 1871 Constitution was promulgated by Guardia on 28 December 1871 and entered into force on 8 May 1872 following the general election held that year.

Guardia remained the dominant political figure in Costa Rica until his death in 1882, ruling for most of the period under an authoritarian regime. During his tenure, only municipal elections were regularly held. Two subsequent attempts to convene constituent assemblies, in 1876 and 1880, were abandoned before completing their work, reportedly because Guardia feared they could become vehicles for political opposition.
