= Marjorie Elliott Sypher =

Canadian-Costa Rican musician

Marjorie Elliott de Oduber

First Lady of Costa Rica
- In role 8 May 1974 – 8 May 1978
- President: Daniel Oduber Quirós
- Preceded by: Karen Olsen Beck
- Succeeded by: Estrella Zeledón Lizano

Personal details
- Born: Marjorie Elliott Sypher; 24 January 1925 Ottawa, Ontario, Canada
- Died: 16 April 2015 (aged 90) San José, Costa Rica
- Party: National Liberation Party
- Spouse: Daniel Oduber Quirós (m. 1948; died 1991)
- Children: 2

Marjorie Elliott Sypher de Oduber (24 January 1925 – 16 April 2015) was a Canadian-born Costa Rican musician and public figure. She served as the First Lady of Costa Rica from 1974 to 1978 during the administration of her husband, former President Daniel Oduber Quirós.

== Biography ==
She was born Marjorie Elliot Sypher in Ottawa, Ontario, Canada, in 1925. Her father, Colin Fraser Elliott, was the Canadian deputy minister of finance, and her mother was Marjorie Sypher, a teacher of voice and piano. She had one brother Fraser Elliott, who became a successful lawyer and businessman in Canada. Elliott Sypher became a concert pianist.

She married Daniel Oduber Quirós, the future President of Costa Rica, in 1948. The couple had two children, Luis Adrian and Ana María. Daniel Oduber died on October 13, 1991, at the age of 70.

Marjorie Elliot Sypher died in San José, Costa Rica, on April 16, 2015, at the age of 90.
