= Roberto Tovar Faja =

Costa Rican lawyer and politician (born 1944)

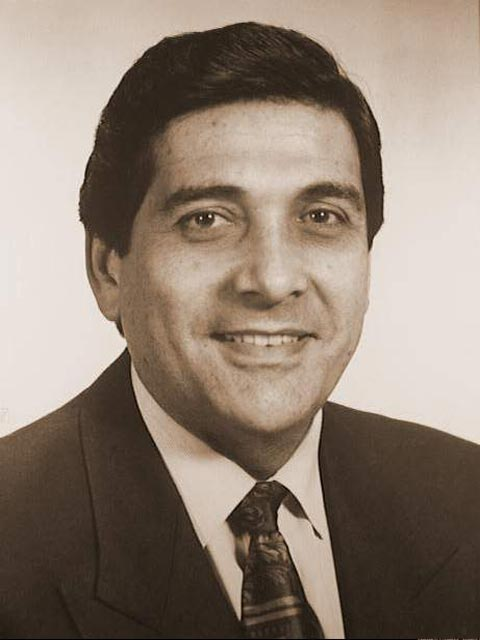
- Tovar in 1990

Minister of Foreign Affairs and Worship
- In office 8 May 2002 – 8 May 2006
- President: Abel Pacheco de la Espriella
- Preceded by: Roberto Rojas López
- Succeeded by: Bruno Stagno Ugarte

Minister of the Presidency of Costa Rica
- In office 8 May 1998 – 14 July 1999
- President: Miguel Ángel Rodríguez
- Preceded by: Marco Vargas Díaz
- Succeeded by: Danilo Chaverri Soto

34th President of the Legislative Assembly of Costa Rica
- In office 1 May 1992 – 30 April 1993
- Preceded by: Miguel Ángel Rodríguez
- Succeeded by: Danilo Chaverri Soto

Deputy of the Legislative Assembly of Costa Rica
- In office 1 May 1990 – 30 April 1994
- Preceded by: Mario Enrique Carvajal Herrera
- Succeeded by: María Lidya Sánchez Valverde
- Constituency: San José (4th Office)
- In office 1 May 1978 – 30 April 1982
- Preceded by: Elías Soley Soler
- Succeeded by: Bernal Jiménez Monge
- Constituency: San José (3rd Office)

Personal details
- Born: Roberto Tovar Faja; 12 November 1944 San José, Costa Rica
- Party: PUSC (from 1983)
- Other political affiliations: Unity Coalition (1976–1983)
- Education: University of Barcelona (LL.D.)

Roberto Tovar Faja (born 12 November 1944) is a Costa Rican lawyer, businessman and retired politician who served as Minister of Foreign Affairs from 2002 to 2006. A founding member of the Social Christian Unity Party, he previously served as Minister of the Presidency from 1998 to 1999 and as the 34th President of the Legislative Assembly from 1992 to 1993.
