= Elías Soley Soler =

Costa Rican lawyer and retired politician (born 1941)

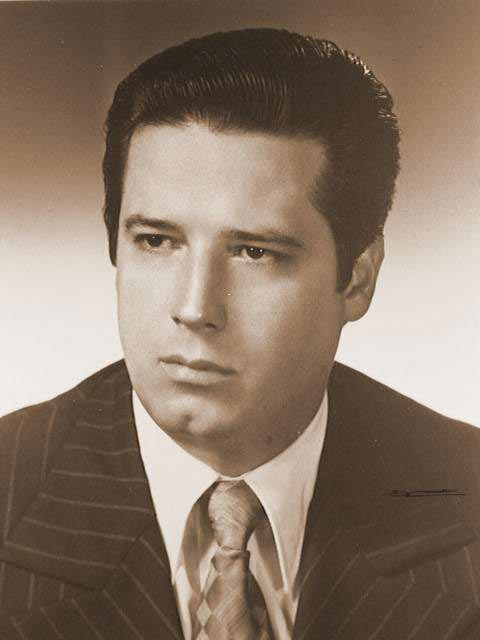
- Soley in 1977

Minister of the Presidency of Costa Rica
- In office 8 May 1994 – 8 March 1995
- President: José María Figueres
- Preceded by: Rolando Laclé Castro
- Succeeded by: Rodrigo Oreamuno Blanco

7th Comptroller General of Costa Rica
- In office 15 May 1987 – 17 February 1992
- President: Óscar Arias Sánchez; Rafael Ángel Calderón Fournier
- Preceded by: Rafael Ángel Chinchilla Fallas
- Succeeded by: Samuel Hidalgo Solano

Ambassador to the United Nations Office at Geneva
- In office 1982–1987
- President: Luis Alberto Monge; Óscar Arias Sánchez

19th President of the Legislative Assembly of Costa Rica
- In office 1 May 1977 – 30 April 1978
- Preceded by: Alfonso Carro Zúñiga
- Succeeded by: Rodrigo Madrigal Nieto

Deputy of the Legislative Assembly of Costa Rica
- In office 1 May 1974 – 30 April 1978
- Preceded by: Jenaro Valverde Marín
- Succeeded by: Roberto Tovar Faja
- Constituency: San José (3rd Office)

Personal details
- Born: Elías Soley Soler; 10 August 1941 (age 85) San José, Costa Rica
- Children: 1
- Education: University of Costa Rica (LLB)

Elías Soley Soler (born 10 May 1941) is a Costa Rican lawyer and retired politician who served as Minister of the Presidency from 1994 to 1995. A member of the National Liberation Party, he previously served as the 7th Comptroller General of Costa Rica from 1987 to 1992 and as the 19th President of the Legislative Assembly from 1977 to 1978.

== Biography ==
Soley was born on 10 May 1941 in San José, Costa Rica. He studied law and began his political career as a member of the National Liberation Party. In 1974, he was elected to the Legislative Assembly for the 1974–1978 term, during which he served as president of the Finance Committee, leader of the National Liberation Party's parliamentary caucus, and vice president of the Assembly before becoming its president for the 1977–1978 legislative year.

From 1982 to 1987, Soley Soler served as Costa Rica's permanent representative to the United Nations Office and other international organizations in Geneva, Switzerland. In 1987, he was appointed Comptroller General of the Republic, succeeding Rafael Ángel Chinchilla Fallas. He remained in the position until 1992, when his resignation was accepted by the Legislative Assembly.

In 1994, President José María Figueres Olsen appointed Soley Minister of the Presidency. He held the position during the first part of the Figueres administration, until his restignation in March 1995. In November 1996, he was acquitted of abuse of authority charges arising from the 1994 expulsion of four Venezuelan nationals. The court found that he had neither ordered nor instigated the expulsions and had not played a leading role in the decision.

After leaving government, Soley Soler continued working as a lawyer. He has practiced in areas including administrative, constitutional, labor, and government-contract law.
