= Fraser Elliott =

Canadian lawyer (1921–2005)

- Born: 25 November 1921; Ottawa, Ontario, Canada
- Died: 26 January 2005 (aged 83); Toronto, Ontario, Canada
- Education: Queen's University (BCom '43); Osgoode Hall (LLB '46); Harvard University (MBA '47)
- Known for: Stikeman Elliott
- Spouse: Elizabeth Ann McNicoll (m. 1955)

Roy Fraser Elliott CM QC (25 November 1921 – 26 January 2005) was a Canadian lawyer, businessman, supporter of the arts, and philanthropist.

== Early life and education ==
Elliott was born in Ottawa, Ontario, a son to Colin Fraser Elliott (at one time, the Deputy Minister of Finance of Canada) and Marjorie Sypher, who taught voice and piano. His younger sister, Marjorie Elliott Sypher, was a concert pianist and served as the First Lady of Costa Rica from 1974 to 1978.

He earned a Bachelor of Commerce degree in 1943 from Queen's University, a Bachelor of Laws (LLB) degree from Osgoode Hall Law School in 1946, and a Master of Business Administration degree from the Harvard Graduate School of Business Administration in 1947. He was called to the Ontario Bar in 1946 and the Quebec Bar in 1948.

== Career and other activities ==
He founded the law firm of Stikeman Elliott, specializing in tax and corporate law, with H. Heward Stikeman in 1952 in Montreal. Stikeman Elliott became and remains one of the largest and most successful law firms in Canada. In 1976, Elliott moved permanently to Toronto to head the Toronto office. Fraser convinced the former premier of Ontario, John Robarts, to join the law firm's small Toronto office instead of joining one of several major firms that were wooing him.

He was once chairman of the board, the largest shareholder, and had been a director since 1951 of CAE Industries Ltd. He also served on the boards of Canadian Imperial Bank of Commerce, Lafarge Corp., Montreal Shipping Inc. and Standard Broadcasting.

In 1949, Elliott wrote the Quebec Corporation Manual. He was co-editor of Doing Business in Canada. He was a former member of the Economic Council of Canada.

He was president of the Art Gallery of Ontario (AGO) and served on the boards of directors of the Toronto Symphony Orchestra and the Canadian Opera Company. He was Chairman Emeritus of the Toronto General and Western Hospital Foundation. Elliott was chairman of the Canadian Cultural Property Export Review Board, which spent money to keep Canadian artworks in Canada, repatriate Canadian artworks and artifacts, and encourage donations of Canadian artworks through tax avoidance. In 1980, he was made a Member of the Order of Canada.

== Philanthropy ==
In 1985, Elliott founded the Fraser Elliott Foundation charitable foundation to pursue philanthropy.

Elliott donated CA$10 million to the Canadian Opera Company's Four Seasons Centre project, and the R. Fraser Elliot Hall is named after him. Elliott donated CA$10 million to the University Health Network (UHN). The Toronto General Hospital's R. Fraser Elliot Wing is named after him in recognition. Elliott donated to the Royal Conservatory of Music in Toronto; the R. Fraser Elliott Centre for Keyboard Studies in the Telus Centre is named after him.

In 2001, CAE donated CA$1,000,000 for the creation of the R. Fraser Elliott Scholarship and Laboratory Program at the École Polytechnique and the Université de Montréal in his honour.

Elliott had an extensive collection of paintings. He started collecting in 1951 in Montreal. He donated the European paintings in his collection to the AGO. His Canadian paintings, including Eight Red Houses by Lawren Harris, were put up for auction in May 2005.

== Personal life ==
He married Elizabeth Ann (Betty-Ann) McNicoll in 1955. McNicoll predeceased Elliott. They had six children: Fraser; Ann; Allison; Adrian; Jordan; and Alexandra. Elliott died at The Toronto General Hospital due to heart failure on 26 January 2005.
