= Alejandro Orfila =

Argentine diplomat (1925–2021)

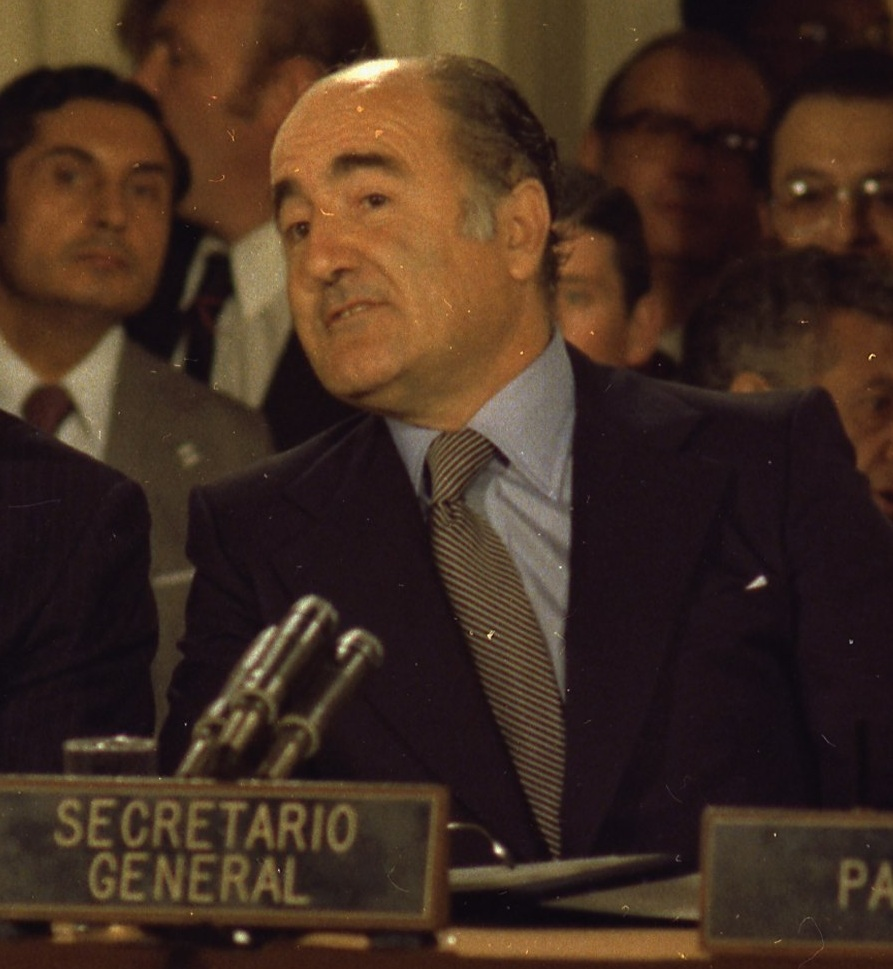
- In 1977
- Born: 9 March 1925; Mendoza, Argentina
- Died: 9 June 2021 (aged 96)
- Occupations: Argentine diplomat and winemaker
- Spouse(s): Jean D'Aprile (first wife), Helga (second wife)
- Children: Alejandro, Martin, Linda, Michael

Alejandro Orfila (9 March 1925 – 9 June 2021) was an Argentine career diplomat. He served as Secretary General of the Organization of American States in 1975–1984 and later became a prominent winemaker in San Diego, California, United States.

== Early career ==
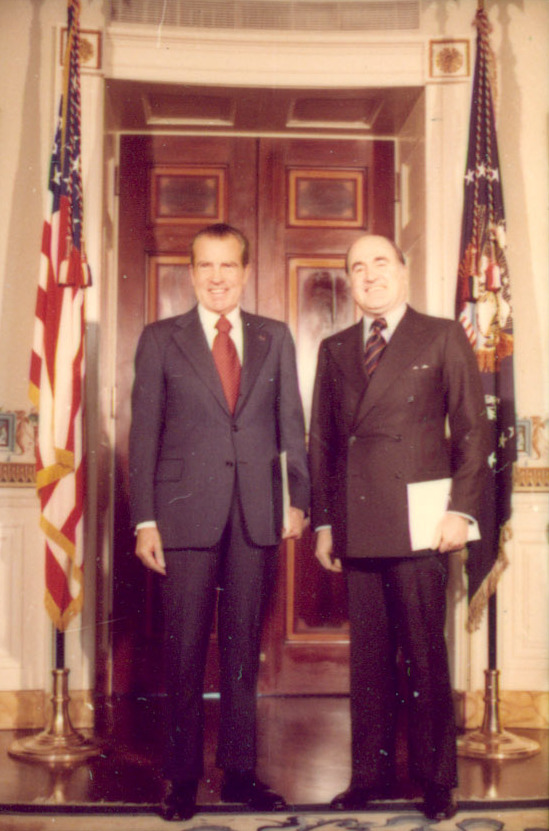
Orfila with Richard Nixon in February 1974.

Orfila was born in Mendoza, Argentina, to Catalan immigrants who had become moderately successful vintners in the province. He received a law degree at the University of Buenos Aires in 1945. The following year, following political science studies at Stanford University, he was assigned to the Argentine Embassy in Moscow; in 1948, however, he was expelled from the Soviet Union on the grounds of espionage. Transferred to the United States, he was appointed Argentine Consul General to San Francisco and later New York, where he remained until his father's death in 1952 compelled him to return to the family business in Mendoza.

Offered the prestigious post of Director of Information at the recently established Organization of American States (OAS), Orfila left for Washington, D.C. in 1953. There, he forged close contacts in the U.S. capital and, after becoming Argentine Ambassador to the U.S. in 1958 and to Japan in 1960, he formed an influential K Street lobbying firm in 1962, specializing in the interests of U.S. firms investing in or trading with Latin America. In 1964 he became the political adviser to the Managing Director of the Adela Investment Company, the largest multinational development corporation for growing the Latin American economy. Close to President Juan Perón since his days in the Soviet Union, Orfila was appointed Ambassador to the United States by the populist Argentine leader, back in power in 1973 after an 18-year-long exile.

== Tenure at the OAS ==
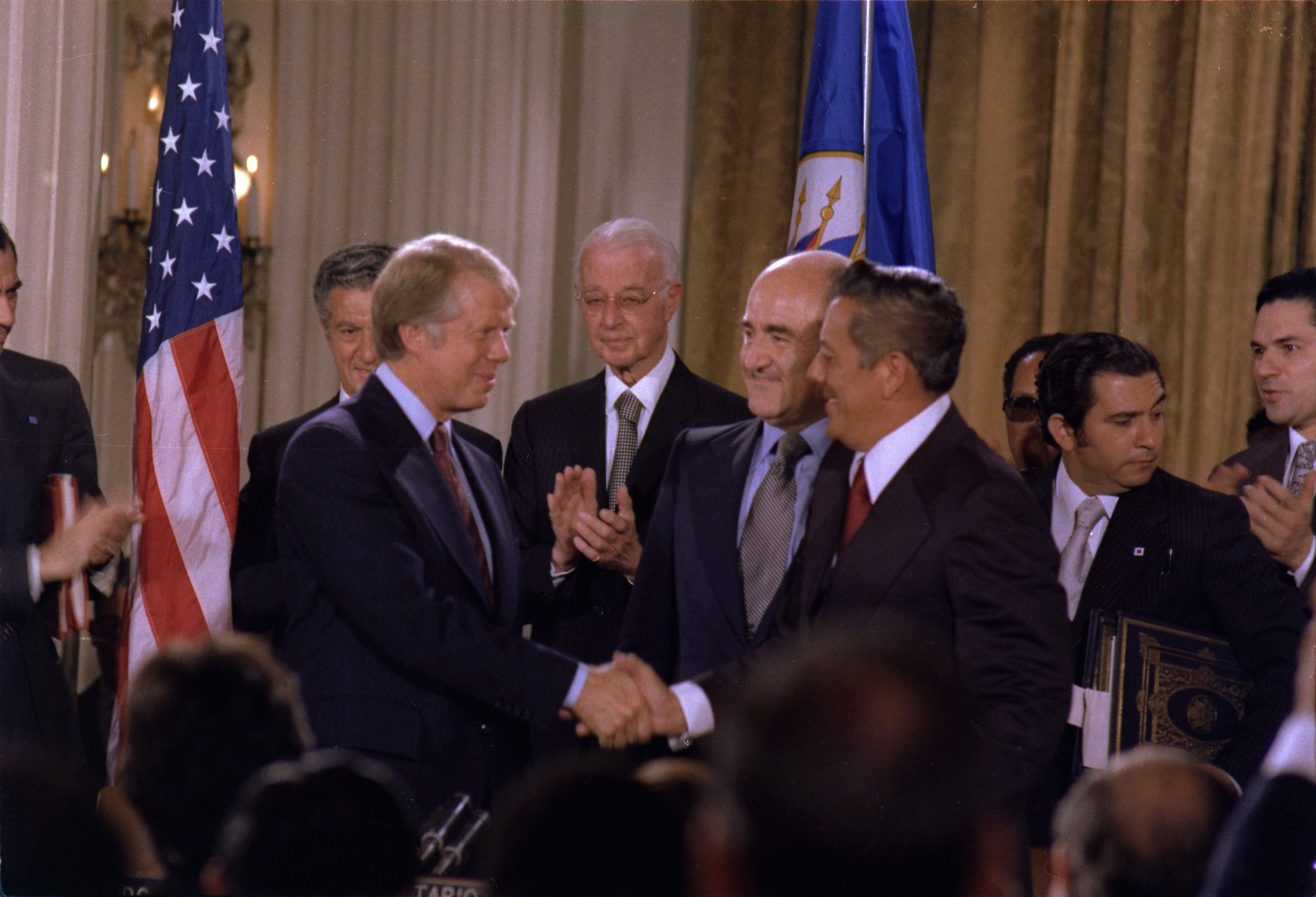
OAS Secretary General Alejandro Orfila (2nd man to the right of Pres. Carter) presides over the signing of the 1977 Panama Canal Treaty.

Upon the retirement of Ecuadorian statesman Galo Plaza from the post of Secretary General of the OAS on 17 May 1975, Orfila was elected to replace him. In this capacity, he moved quickly to repair the OAS's relationship with its most important member, the United States. Inheriting an OAS closely identified with the Non-Aligned Movement, he dismissed a number of Plaza's appointees looked upon unfavorably by U.S. Secretary of State Henry Kissinger. Preferring his own brand of "gala diplomacy" to confrontation, Orfila was fond of enlisting his sumptuous beltway home for diplomatic dinners in the interest of assuaging differences.

Orfila's influence in U.S. foreign policy circles, however, remained marginal until the advent of the Administration of U.S. President Jimmy Carter in early 1977. Orfila rallied support in the OAS for Carter's campaign pledge to renegotiate U.S. presence in the Panama Canal Zone, a contentious issue across Latin America. The Panama Canal Treaty was signed at OAS headquarters in September of that year. Taking the OAS into a more active role in Latin America's economic development than had been the case before, Orfila facilitated the Inter-American Development Bank as a means to provide these governments an alternative to the high-interest credit markets in the world's financial capitals, a policy that backfired somewhat after many of these nations entered a debt repayments crisis in 1981.

Supported in many circles for his long-standing anti-communist policies, Orfila nevertheless actively opposed the tide of human rights abuses in Latin America. Working with President Carter and the U.S. Assistant Secretary of State for Human Rights, Patricia Derian, he marshalled the then-dormant Inter-American Commission on Human Rights into investigations inside repressive regimes like his own country's, the Argentine military junta; after looking into allegations of widespread political murders and kidnappings in September 1979, the commission's 1980 report removed any doubts as to the state of freedoms in the country at the time, and helped lead to an improvement in the climate of civil liberties.

These moves, however, undermined Orfila's standing in Washington after Ronald Reagan became U.S. president in early 1981, particularly among President Reagan's foreign policy advisers such as Jeane Kirkpatrick, who, as Republican Party campaign adviser in 1980, chided the OAS investigations into atrocities by admonishing them to be more supportive of "moderately repressive regimes". With violence in the region more concentrated in Central America after 1980, Orfila lost a valuable ally in his efforts to mediate the area's civil wars when Panamanian strongman Omar Torrijos's plane exploded in August 1981.

Orfila lent the OAS's support to the establishment of the Contadora Group in hopes of alleviating the worsening wars in Nicaragua, Guatemala and El Salvador. This support, as well as that of the United Nations and a number of other international bodies, failed to compensate for President Reagan's opposition to the initiative, however. A 1982 resolution he supported, asserting Argentina's claims on the Falkland Islands, resulted in a policy embarrassment for the OAS after Falklands War ended in disaster for Argentina. The severe economic downturn in almost the entire western hemisphere was addressed by Orfila with efforts to renegotiate Latin American debt repayments; this met with opposition in the Reagan Administration on this, as well, and on 26 October 1983, the OAS voted to condemn the U.S. invasion of Grenada, making Orfila's policy rift with Reagan final.

Towards the end of the year, accusations of influence peddling arose against Orfila. Increasingly unable to exert credibility despite the lack of evidence for the allegations, on 21 June 1984, Secretary General Orfila resigned his post, expressing frustration over the OAS's inability to influence U.S. Latin American policy during the 1980s. He was succeeded by Brazilian Vice-Minister of Foreign Affairs João Clemente Baena Soares.

== Personal life ==
During his diplomatic years, he was married to his first wife, an American, Jean D'Aprile, daughter of a Rochester, New York, judge. They had four children: Alejandro, Martin, Linda and Michael. Orfila is grandfather to Martin's four children and Linda's two children.

In 1985, Orfila was sued by a former subordinate, Carr Donald, over allegedly having been dismissed without cause. The lawsuit failed, however, and in 1986, an appellate court upheld the ruling against Mr. Donald.

Following his resignation in 1984, Orfila retired to his estate in Argentina, focusing on building up his Argentine ranch and vineyards. Since 1994, he has owned Orfila Vineyards and Winery, an award-winning vineyard in the San Pasqual Valley, in Escondido, California, U.S. The winery claims more than 1,100 awards for its wines. According to Orfila Vineyards literature, he lived in exclusive Rancho Santa Fe, California, with his second wife, German-born Helga.

Orfila died in San Diego, California, in June 2021 at the age of 96.

Diplomatic posts
Preceded by Galo Plaza	Secretary General of the Organization of American States; 1975–1984	Succeeded by João Clemente Baena Soares
