= Baena Soares =

Brazilian diplomat (1931–2023)

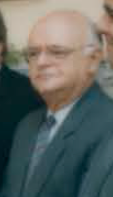
Soares in 1990

João Clemente Baena Soares (14 May 1931 – 7 June 2023) was a Brazilian diplomat.

Soares was born in Belém. He worked at the Brazilian Ministry of External Relations for 31 years before being elected to serve as Secretary General of the Organization of American States from 1984 to 1994.

In Brazil, he also served as Secretary General of Foreign Affairs of Brazil.

Between 1997 and 2006, he was a member of the United Nations International Law Commission. On 4 November 2003 UN Secretary-General Kofi Annan appointed him to sit on the High Level Threat Panel.

On 1 September 2006, he was appointed to the United Nations Human Rights Council's High-Level Commission of Inquiry charged with probing allegations that Israel systematically targeted and killed Lebanese civilians during the 2006 Lebanon War.

Soares died on 7 June 2023, at the age of 92.

== Publications ==
- Sem medo da diplomácia (2006)

Diplomatic posts
Preceded by Alejandro Orfila	Secretary General of the Organization of American States; 1984–1994	Succeeded by César Gaviria
