= Constitutional Chamber of the Supreme Court of Justice of Costa Rica =

Constitutional court of Costa Rica

Constitutional Chamber of the Supreme Court of Justice
- Sala Constitucional de la Corte Suprema de Justicia
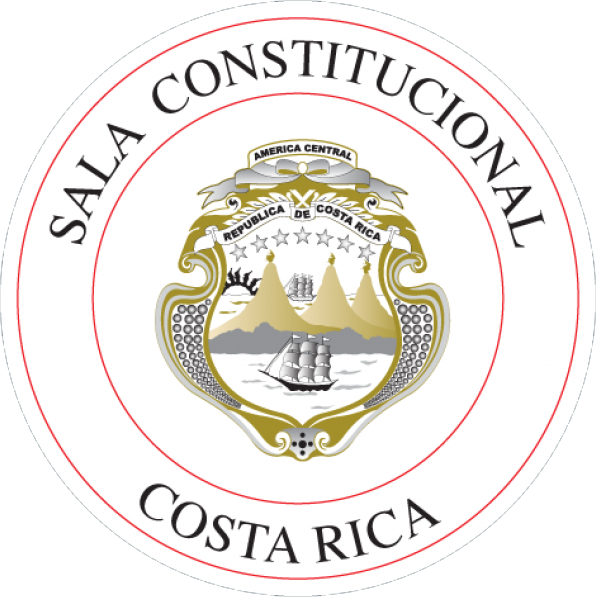

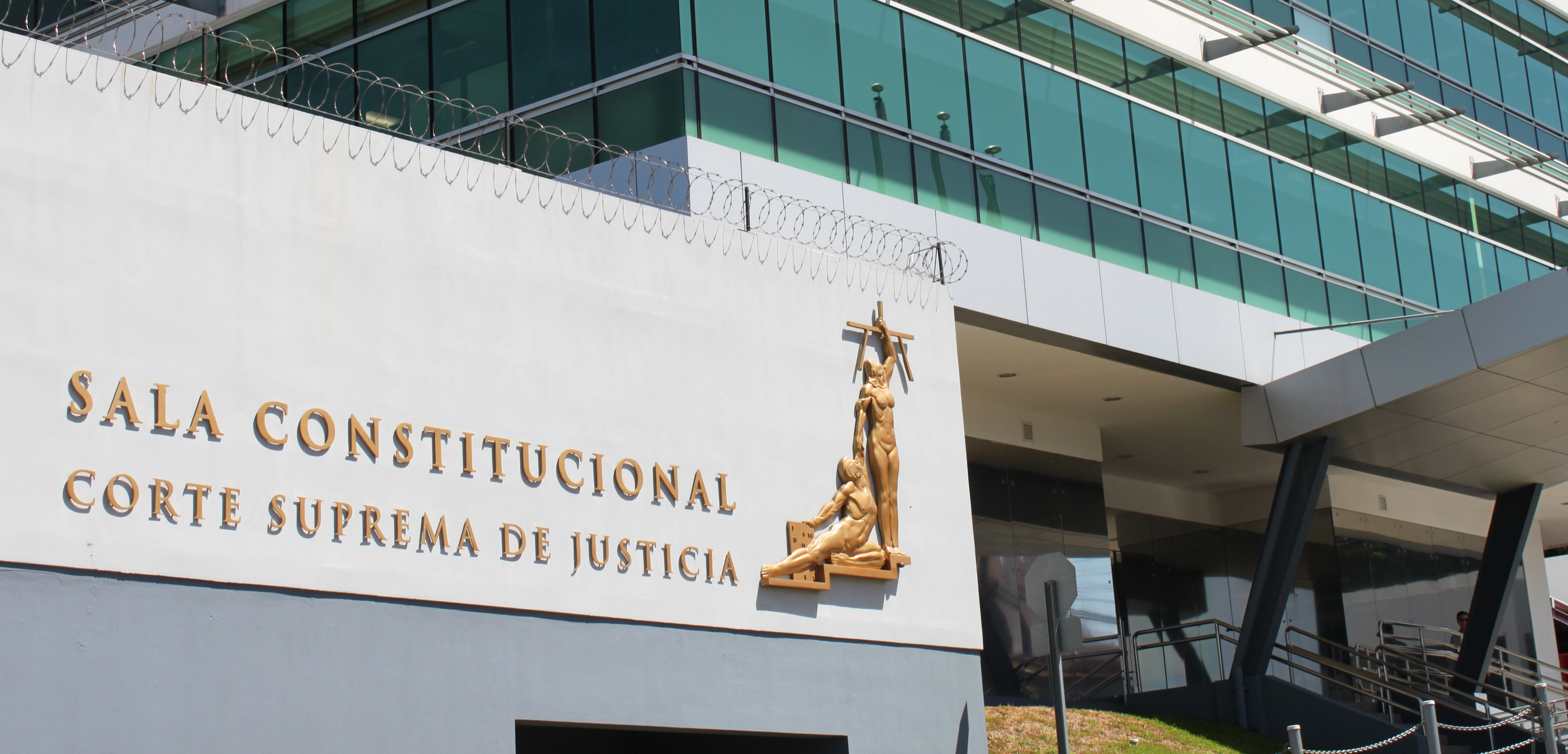
- Building of the Constitutional Chamber in Mata Redonda, San José.
- Interactive map of Constitutional Chamber of the Supreme Court of Justice
- Established: 18 August 1989; 37 years ago
- Location: Mata Redonda, San José
- Composition method: Appointment by the Legislative Assembly
- Authorised by: Constitution of Costa Rica
- Judge term length: 8 years, renewable
- Number of positions: 7
- Website: salaconstitucional.poder-judicial.go.cr

President of the Constitutional Chamber
- Currently: Fernando Castillo Víquez
- Since: 10 May 2020

The Constitutional Chamber of the Supreme Court of Justice (Spanish: Sala Constitucional de la Corte Suprema de Justicia), also known as Sala IV, is a chamber of the Supreme Court of Costa Rica responsible for reviewing the constitutionality of laws and protecting constitutional rights and freedoms. It hears cases involving constitutional rights, including habeas corpus and amparo petitions, as well as actions and consultations concerning the constitutionality of laws and other governmental acts.

The Constitutional Chamber consists of seven full magistrates and twelve alternate magistrates. Full magistrates are elected by the Legislative Assembly for eight-year terms and may be reelected indefinitely under the procedure established by the Constitution. The Chamber operates under the Law of Constitutional Jurisdiction.

Since 20 March 2017, the Constitutional Chamber has operated separately from the other three chambers of the Supreme Court, in the San José district of Mata Redonda.

== History ==
The creation of a specialized constitutional jurisdiction was promoted during the first administration of President Óscar Arias Sánchez (1986–1990) under the National Liberation Party. A special commission was established to study reforms intended to improve the administration of justice and strengthen the protection of constitutional rights.

A constitutional reform proposal was presented to the Legislative Assembly in 1987. It sought to amend Articles 10, 48, 105, and 128 of the Constitution and add Article 153 bis, establishing a specialized body for constitutional review and the protection of fundamental rights. The proposal was assigned legislative file No. 10.401 and was subsequently referred to a special committee for consideration.

The Legislative Assembly approved the reform in three debates in 1989. It became Legislative Decree No. 7128 on 15 June 1989 and was sanctioned by President Arias on 18 August. Following its publication in La Gaceta, the reform entered into force on 1 September 1989. The Law of Constitutional Jurisdiction was subsequently enacted to establish the procedures governing the new jurisdiction.

Before the establishment of the Constitutional Chamber, constitutional review was exercised by different judicial bodies at various times. Beginning in 1888, individual judges were responsible for reviewing the constitutionality of laws, decrees, and government agreements. In 1915, this authority was transferred to the Court of Cassation. Following reforms to the Code of Civil Procedure, constitutional review was transferred to the Supreme Court in 1938. In 1989, jurisdiction was assumed by the newly established Constitutional Chamber.

Similarly, jurisdiction over habeas corpus petitions was exercised by the full Supreme Court before 1989. The amparo procedure, established by Law No. 1161 of 2 June 1950, was initially assigned to the criminal courts and was later transferred to the First Chamber of the Supreme Court in 1980. Both jurisdictions were transferred to the Constitutional Chamber following its establishment in 1989.

The first president of the Constitutional Chamber was magistrate Alejandro Rodríguez Vega.

== Jurisdiction ==
The Constitutional Chamber is responsible for safeguarding the supremacy of the Constitution and the fundamental rights and freedoms recognized by the Constitution and applicable international human rights instruments. Its jurisdiction includes:

- Habeas corpus petitions;
- Amparo proceedings for the protection of constitutional rights;
- Actions of unconstitutionality;
- Legislative and judicial consultations concerning constitutionality; and
- Constitutional disputes between branches or organs of government.

The Chamber is also responsible for determining its own jurisdiction and resolving incidental matters arising in proceedings before it, as provided by the Law of Constitutional Jurisdiction.

== Composition ==
The Constitutional Chamber is composed of seven full magistrates and twelve alternate magistrates. It is the chamber of the Supreme Court with the largest number of magistrates when both full and alternate members are taken into account.

The Constitution provides that the Supreme Court shall have the number of magistrates necessary for its proper functioning, while the Law of Constitutional Jurisdiction establishes the number of magistrates serving on the Constitutional Chamber.

Magistrates are subject to the general rules governing judicial impartiality and may be recused from cases in circumstances established by law. A magistrate may also request to be removed from a case when grounds for recusal exist.

=== Appointment ===
Full magistrates of the Constitutional Chamber are elected by the Legislative Assembly for eight-year terms. They are automatically reelected unless the Legislative Assembly votes against their continuation before the expiration of their term, in accordance with the procedure established by the Constitution.

When a vacancy occurs, the Supreme Court notifies the Legislative Assembly, which refers the matter to its Appointments Committee. Candidates who meet the constitutional requirements may submit their credentials for consideration. The committee's recommendation is not binding on the Legislative Assembly.

A candidate must receive the favorable vote of at least 38 members of the Legislative Assembly to be elected as a magistrate.

Alternate magistrates are also elected by the Legislative Assembly, from a list submitted by the Supreme Court. Their terms last four years, and they may be reelected, although their reelection is not automatic.

=== Requirements ===
Article 159 of the 1949 Constitution establishes the requirements for appointment as a magistrate of the Supreme Court, which also apply to members of the Constitutional Chamber. A candidate must be a Costa Rican citizen by birth, or a naturalized citizen who has maintained domicile in Costa Rica for at least ten years after obtaining citizenship; be a citizen in good standing; be a secular person; be at least 35 years old; and hold a law degree issued or recognized in Costa Rica and have practiced law for at least ten years, or have at least five years of judicial experience if the candidate is a judicial official. The final requirement was incorporated through Law No. 2026 of 15 June 1956.

Article 160 of the Constitution establishes restrictions based on family relationships with sitting Supreme Court magistrates, while Article 161 provides that the office of magistrate is incompatible with holding an official position in another branch of government.
