= Stikeman Elliott =

Canadian business law firm

Stikeman Elliott LLP
- No. of offices: 8
- No. of attorneys: 485 (2022)
- Revenue: USD 352,631,666 (2022)
- Date founded: 1952
- Founder: H. Heward Stikeman & Fraser Elliott
- Company type: Limited liability partnership
- Website: www.stikeman.com

Stikeman Elliott LLP is a Canadian business law firm founded in 1952 by H. Heward Stikeman and Fraser Elliott. The firm has offices located in Montreal, Toronto, Calgary, Vancouver, New York and London. Since 2024, the chair of the firm is Peter Castiel.

== History ==
Heward Stikeman and Fraser Elliott established a tax boutique firm in Montreal in 1952. The firm expanded throughout the ensuing years, eventually becoming a full-service business law firm. Stikeman Elliott has never merged with another firm, one of the few Bay Street firms not to do so.

The firm is one of the Seven Sisters, a group of seven prominent Canadian law firms.
