= Rodrigo Madrigal Nieto =

Costa Rican politician (1924–2006)

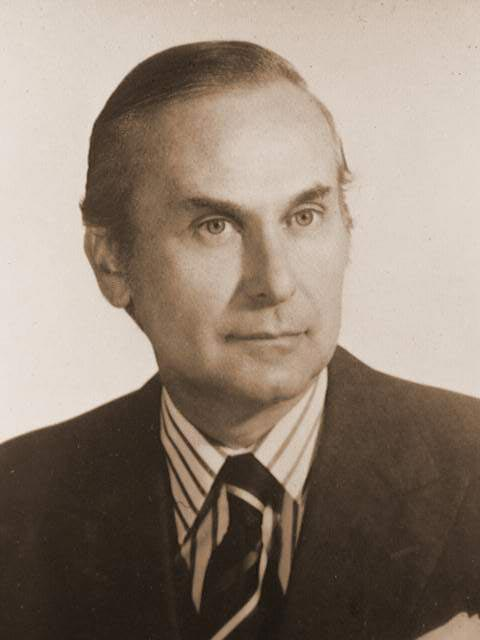
- Rodríguez c. 1949

Minister of Foreign Affairs
- In office 8 May 1986 – 8 May 1990
- President: Óscar Arias Sánchez
- Preceded by: Carlos Gutiérrez Gutiérrez
- Succeeded by: Bernd H. Niehaus Quesada

20th President of the Legislative Assembly of Costa Rica
- In office 1 May 1978 – 30 April 1979
- Preceded by: Elías Soley Soler
- Succeeded by: Ramón Aguilar Facio

Deputy of the Legislative Assembly of Costa Rica
- In office 1 May 1978 – 30 April 1982
- Preceded by: Alfonso Carro Zúñiga
- Succeeded by: Hernán Garrón Salazar
- Constituency: San José (1st Office)

Personal details
- Born: Rodrigo Madrigal Nieto; 14 March 1924 San José, Costa Rica
- Died: 11 October 2006 (aged 82) San José, Costa Rica
- Party: PLN
- Other political affiliations: Unity Coalition (1977–1982)
- Education: University of Costa Rica (LLB)
- Occupation: Lawyer; journalist; politician; diplomat; businessman

Rodrigo Madrigal Nieto (14 March 1924 – 11 October 2006) was a Costa Rican lawyer, journalist and politician who served as Minister of Foreign Affairs from 1986 to 1990. A member of the National Liberation Party, he previously served as President of the Legislative Assembly from 1978 to 1979 under the Unity Coalition. He played a central role in reaching the Central American peace agreement for which President Óscar Arias was awarded the Nobel Peace Prize in 1987.
