= Juan Rafael Mata Lafuente =

Costa Rican politician

Juan Rafael Mata Lafuente (October 28, 1821 – November 19, 1885) was a Costa Rican politician.

He was born in Cartago, Costa Rica, and was baptized on October 28, 1821. His parents were Joaquin de la Mata y Brenes and Maria Joaquina de la Fuente y Alvarado. He was married to Rafaela Brenes Gomez. He graduated with a degree in law.

He was stand-in magistrate for the Supreme Court of Justice of Costa Rica; Judge of the Treasury of the Republic; member of the Constituent Assemblies in 1859 and 1870; member of the Chamber of Senators in 1866 and 1868; Secretary of Exterior Relations and annexed departments from May 8 to May 31, 1869 and from May 8 to July 30, 1876; Representative at the Constitutional Congress from 1872 to 1876 and from 1882 to 1884; and member of the Board of Public Instruction.

He also held the post of Notary Mayor of the Ecclesiastical Court of Costa Rica from 1873 to 1876 and from 1879 to 1885. He died in San José, Costa Rica, on November 19, 1885.
