= Fernando Volio Jiménez =

Costa Rican diplomat and politician (1924–1996)

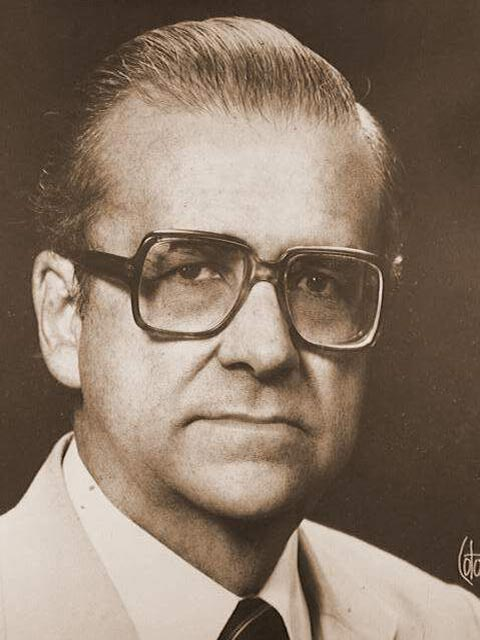
- Volio in 1987

14th & 29th President of the Legislative Assembly of Costa Rica
- In office 1 May 1987 – 30 April 1988
- Preceded by: Rose Marie Karpinsky Dodero
- Succeeded by: José Luis Valenciano Chaves
- In office 1 May 1968 – 30 April 1969
- Preceded by: Hernán Garrón Salazar
- Succeeded by: José Luis Molina Quesada
Other positions
Deputy of the Legislative Assembly of Costa Rica
In office 1 May 1986 – 30 April 1990
Preceded by	Hernán Garrón Salazar
Succeeded by	Miguel Ángel Rodríguez
Constituency	San José (1st Office)
In office 1 May 1966 – 30 April 1970
Preceded by	Teodoro Quirós Castro
Succeeded by	Luis Alberto Monge
Constituency	San José (2nd Office)
Minister of Foreign Affairs
In office 8 May 1982 – 1 December 1983
President	Luis Alberto Monge
Preceded by	Bernd Niehaus Quesada
Succeeded by	Carlos José Gutiérrez Gutiérrez
Minister of the Presidency of Costa Rica
In office 5 September 1977 – 8 May 1978
President	Daniel Oduber Quirós
Preceded by	Wilburg Jiménez Castro
Succeeded by	José Rafael Cordero Croceri
Minister of Public Education
In office 8 May 1974 – 8 May 1978
President	Daniel Oduber Quirós
Preceded by	Uladislao Gámez Solano
Succeeded by	María Eugenia Dengo
Permanent Representative to the United Nations
In office 8 May 1962 – 22 September 1965
President	Francisco Orlich Bolmarcich
Succeeded by	Luis Demetrio Tinoco Castro

Personal details
- Born: Fernando Anselmo Antonio Volio Jiménez; 29 October 1924 Cartago, Costa Rica
- Died: 21 May 1996 (aged 71) San José, Costa Rica
- Party: PLN
- Children: 4
- Education: University of Costa Rica (LLB)

Fernando Anselmo Antonio Volio Jiménez (29 October 1924 – 21 May 1996) was a Costa Rican lawyer, diplomat and statesman. He was a member of the Inter-American Commission on Human Rights and served as foreign minister for a time. He was President of the Legislative Assembly of Costa Rica twice - 1968–1969 and 1987–1988.

His work on human rights was not entirely without controversy. His anti-communism made him a "tolerable" investigator of abuses under Augusto Pinochet and his report on the matter was criticized as too mild.
