= Orfila Vineyards and Winery =

Winery in San Diego County, California

Orfila Vineyards and Winery is a winery in Escondido, California. The site had been used for grape-growing and winemaking before it took the Orfila name.

Leon Santoro was the winery's founding winemaker. He was born in Italy and began his career in Napa Valley before moving to San Diego County. He worked at Thomas Jaeger Winery and later at Orfila.

In 1988, Christian Brothers purchased Quail Ridge Premium Winery, with Santoro and Elaine Wellsley remaining as winemakers after the acquisition. Santoro later became associated with the promotion of Mediterranean grape varieties in Southern California. Wine Spectator noted that he encouraged growers in San Diego and Riverside counties to plant varieties such as Syrah, Sangiovese, and Viognier.

The winery's reception has been documented mainly through trade and regional wine coverage. In 2024, local coverage reported a change in ownership. Axios later noted the winery's place in the local hospitality scene.
