= Manuel José Carazo Bonilla =

Costa Rican politician

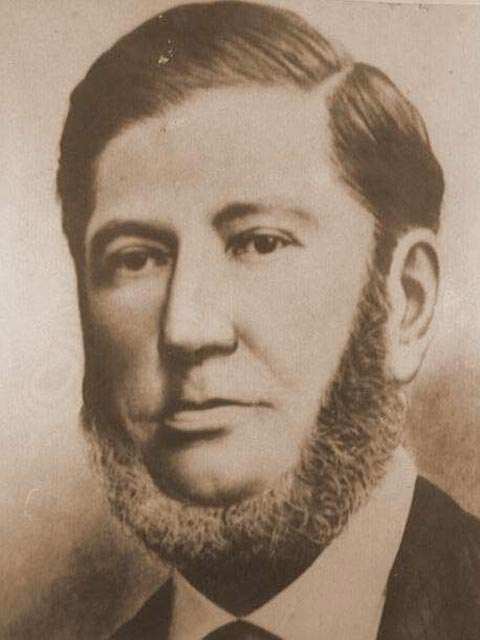

Second Designate to the Presidency
- In office 8 May 1862 – 8 May 1863
- President: José María Montealegre
- Preceded by: Juan González Reyes
- Succeeded by: Aniceto Esquivel Sáenz

Personal details
- Born: Manuel José Carazo Bonilla; 24 June 1808 Heredia, Province of Costa Rica, Captaincy General of Guatemala, Spanish Empire
- Died: 1 June 1877 (aged 68) San José, Costa Rica
- Party: Independent

Manuel José Carazo Bonilla (1808–1877) was a Costa Rican businessman and politician who served as Second Designate to the Presidency from 1862 to 1863.

He was the son of Joaqiín Carazo y Alvarado, signatory of the Act of Independence of Costa Rica, and Ana Francisca de Bonilla. His uncle was, among others, Nicolás Carazo and Alvarado and Don Pedro José Carazo and Alvarado, also signatories of the Act.
