= Pedro María León-Páez y Brown =

Costa Rican politician

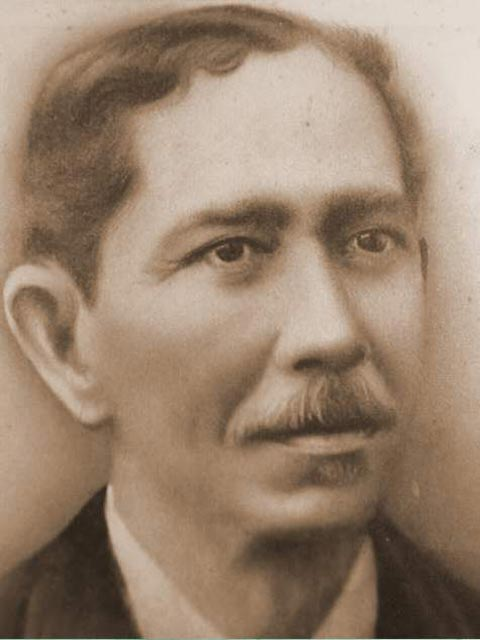
- Born: June 29, 1835; Cartagena, Colombia
- Died: December 22, 1903 (aged 68)

Pedro María León-Páez y Brown (June 29, 1835 – December 22, 1903) was a Colombian lawyer, educator, and Costa Rican politician. He moved to Costa Rica in 1880. As an educator, he founded a secondary school in Cartago, Costa Rica and taught at the Universidad de Santo Tomás. As a politician, he was a judge of the Supreme Court of Costa Rica, led several ministries in José Joaquín Rodríguez Zeledón's government, and between 1894 and 1900 was the president of the Congress of Costa Rica.
