= Joaquín Bernardo Calvo Rosales =

Costa Rican politician

Joaquín Bernardo Calvo Rosales (1799–1865) was a Costa Rican politician, born in Cartago, Costa Rica, Viceroyalty of New Spain in 1799. His first wife was Juana Vicenta Fernandez y Quirós and he remarried to Salvadora Mora y Perez.

He studied in Cartago with Rafael Francisco Osejo.

He was interim General Minister of Costa Rica 1827 to 1835 and Political Head of the Eastern Department in 1835. For his participation in the War of Liga (civil war of 1835) he was for a time exiled in Nicaragua. Later he was Magistrate of the Court of appeal, Minister of Property and War, Minister of Interior and Exterior Relations, Minister of Exterior Relations and Ecclesiastic Businesses, Minister of Interior and annexed portfolios and President of the Senate and the Legislative Body. As Chancellor, he signed in 1856 the Calvo treaty, the first bordering agreement between Costa Rica and Colombia.

He died in San José, Costa Rica, in 1865.

His son Joaquín Bernardo Calvo Mora was, for many years, Minister Plenipotentiary of Costa Rica in Washington, D.C.
