= Julián Volio Llorente =

Costa Rican politician (1827–1889

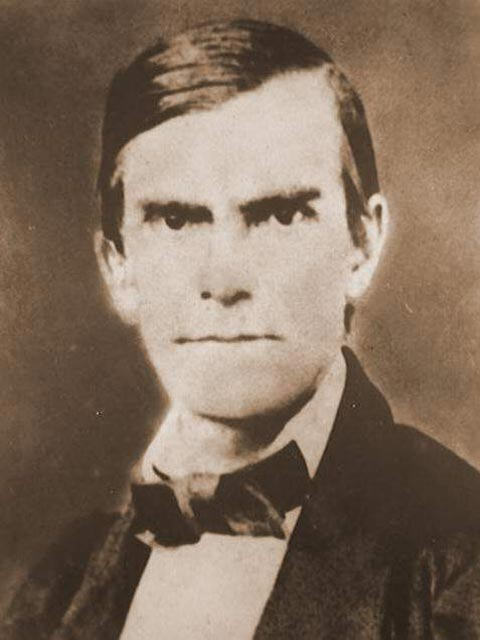
- Volio in 1860

First Designate to the Presidency
- In office 8 May 1866 – 8 May 1867
- President: Jesús Jiménez Zamora
- Preceded by: José María Castro Madriz
- Succeeded by: José María Montealegre Fernández
- In office 8 May 1862 – 8 May 1863
- President: José María Montealegre Fernández
- Preceded by: Jesús Jiménez Zamora
- Succeeded by: Agapito Jiménez Zamora

Secretary of Foreign Affairs
- In office 8 May 1863 – 1 November 1868
- President: Jesús Jiménez Zamora
- Preceded by: Francisco Yglesias Llorente
- Succeeded by: Aniceto Esquivel Sáenz

Personal details
- Born: Julián Volio Llorente; 17 February 1827 Cartago, Costa Rica, Federal Republic of Central America
- Died: 26 November 1889 (aged 62) San José, Costa Rica
- Party: Independent
- Education: Universidad de San Carlos de Guatemala (BA)

Julián Volio Llorente (17 February 1827 – 26 November 1889) was a Costa Rican lawyer, diplomat and politician. As a key figure in 19th-century Costa Rican politics, Volio held various influential positions, including Minister of Governance, Justice, and Ecclesiastical Affairs, and later as Minister of Foreign Affairs and Public Instruction.

== Early life and education ==
Julián Volio Llorente was born in Cartago, Costa Rica, where he completed his primary education. He later studied law at the University of San Carlos in Guatemala, obtaining his degree in 1848. His legal education provided a foundation for his involvement in Costa Rican politics and educational advocacy.
