= Daniel Oduber Quirós =

President of Costa Rica from 1974 to 1978

Daniel Oduber Quirós OYC BVO OPC
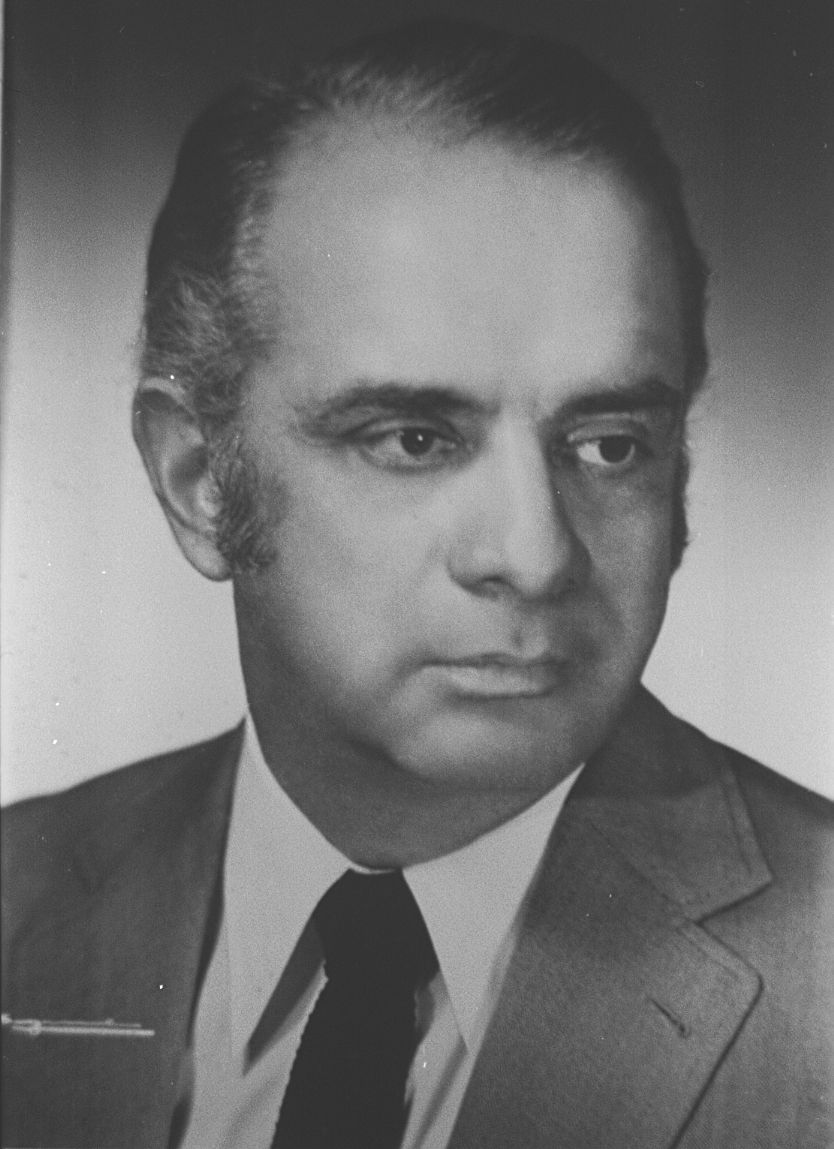

37th President of Costa Rica
- In office 8 May 1974 – 8 May 1978
- Vice President: Carlos Manuel Castillo Morales; Fernando Guzmán Mata
- Preceded by: José Figueres Ferrer
- Succeeded by: Rodrigo Carazo Odio
Other positions
16th President of the Legislative Assembly of Costa Rica
In office 1 May 1970 – 30 April 1973
Preceded by	José Luis Molina Quesada
Succeeded by	Luis Alberto Monge
Deputy of the Legislative Assembly of Costa Rica
In office 1 May 1970 – 30 April 1974
Preceded by	Rodrigo Carazo Odio
Succeeded by	Alfonso Carro Zúñiga
Constituency	San José (1st Office)
In office 1 May 1958 – 30 April 1962
Preceded by	Rodrigo Carazo Odio
Succeeded by	Alfonso Carro Zúñiga
Constituency	San José (1st Office)
Minister of Foreign Affairs
In office 8 May 1962 – 1 January 1965
President	Francisco Orlich Bolmarcich
Preceded by	Alfredo Vargas Fernández
Succeeded by	Mario Gómez Calvo
Secretary-General of the National Liberation Party
In office April 1956 – April 1958
President	María Obregón Zamora; Rafael París Steffes
Preceded by	Gonzalo Solórzano González
Succeeded by	José Francisco Carballo Quirós
Secretary-General of the Founding Junta of the Second Republic
In office 8 May 1948 – 8 November 1949
President	José Figueres Ferrer
Preceded by	Position established
Succeeded by	Position abolished

Personal details
- Born: Porfirio Ricardo José Luis Daniel Oduber Quirós; 25 August 1921 San José, Costa Rica
- Died: 13 October 1991 (aged 70) Escazú, Costa Rica
- Party: PLN (from 1951)
- Spouse: Marjorie Elliott de Oduber (m. 1948)
- Children: 2
- Relatives: Pedro Quirós Jiménez (great-grandson); Carlos Humberto Rodríguez Quirós (second cousin)
- Education: University of Costa Rica (LLB); McGill University (MA)
- Occupation: Lawyer; politician; philosopher; poet; essayist
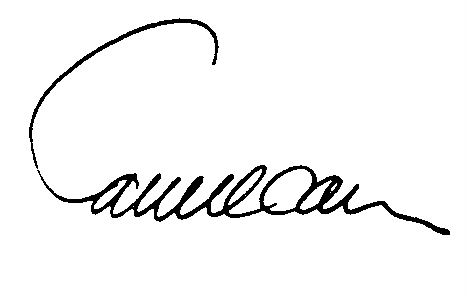
- Signature

Porfirio Ricardo José Luis Daniel Oduber Quirós (25 August 1921 – 13 October 1991) was a Costa Rican intellectual and statesman who served as the 37th President of Costa Rica from 1974 to 1978. A member of the National Liberation Party, he previously served as President of the Legislative Assembly from 1970 to 1973.

During his administration, the government established the Costa Rican Museum of Art, the Distance State University (UNED) and the La Sabana Metropolitan Park, and enacted the Social Development and Family Allowances Act, which expanded social assistance programs for low-income families by helping reduce expenses related to food, healthcare, childcare, and eldercare. His presidency also promoted student loan programs and supported the expansion of national parks, recreational areas, and cultural institutions.

== Biography ==
In 1926, he was enrolled in the kindergarten of the Dolorosa church in the city of San José. Between 1928 and 1933, he studied primary education at the Buenaventura Corrales School.

Oduber worked as a lawyer early in his career. In 1945, Oduber went to Canada to study philosophy at McGill University, graduating with a Master of Arts degree. In 1948, he returned to Costa Rica and participated in the revolution led by José Figueres Ferrer. When their faction won, he was named Secretary-General of the Founding Junta of the Second Republic.

Some time later he traveled to Paris, where he continued his philosophical studies at the Sorbonne. In 1948, while studying in France, he married Marjorie Elliott Sypher, the daughter of Canadian diplomats. The couple had two children, Luis Adrian and Ana María.

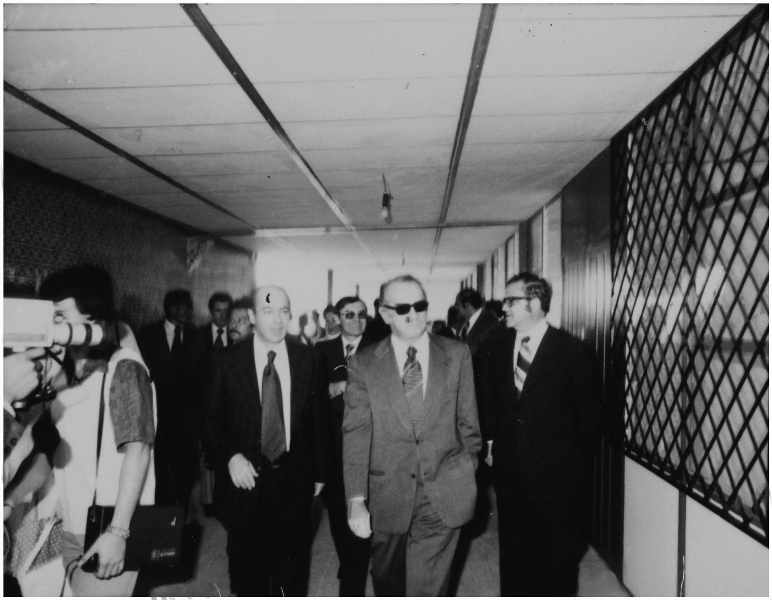
Daniel Oduber during the inauguration of the new facilities of the Franco-Costa Rican High School

After returning to Costa Rica, he worked in national politics, working with the Figueres presidency campaign and becoming an Ambassador in Mexico and later in Europe. He also served as foreign minister from 1962 to 1965. He was President of the Legislative Assembly of Costa Rica from 1970 to 1973.

He initially ran for president in 1966, narrowly losing to Joaquín Trejos. He was later elected in 1974. His government was very socially focused, dealing heavily with working class issues. He worked on raising the quality of life of rural areas and bettered pricing for agricultural products. A lot of attention was given to reforestation and the preservation of natural resources. On the international front, his government was popular amongst the Central American nations. During his term in office, Oduber granted legal status to the communist party (1975) and restored consular relations with Cuba (1977). He sided and worked with Presidents Jimmy Carter and Omar Torrijos to defend Panama's sovereignty.

The airport located near Liberia, Daniel Oduber International Airport, was named in his honor. There is a full statue of him in San Jose, the capital of Costa Rica.

Daniel Oduber died on 13 October 1991 in Escazú.

Political offices
Preceded by José Figueres Ferrer	President of Costa Rica; 1974–1978	Succeeded by Rodrigo Alberto Carazo Odio
