= Jesús Jiménez Zamora =

President of Costa Rica (1863–1866; 1868–1870)

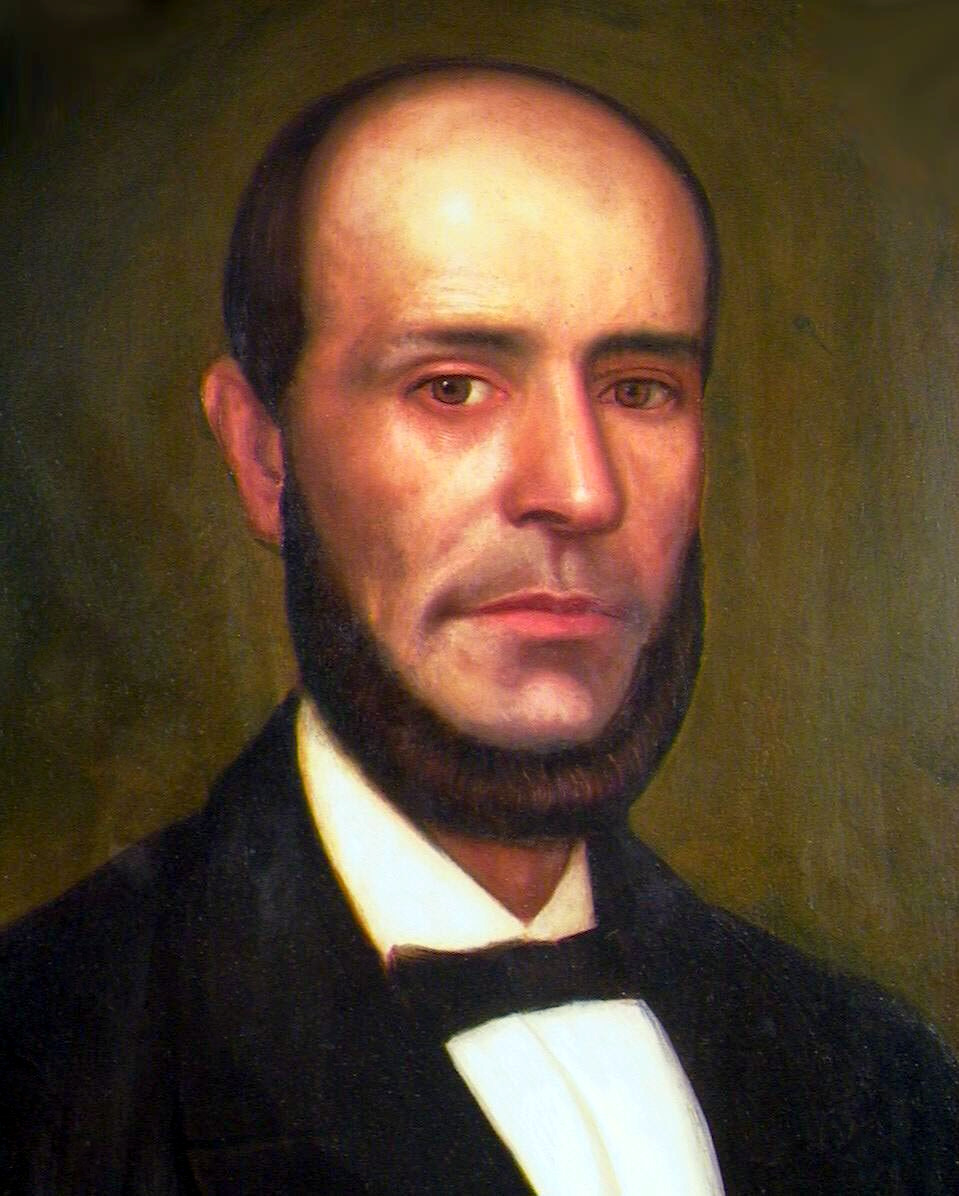

4th and 6th President of Costa Rica
- In office 1 November 1868 – 27 April 1870
- Preceded by: José María Castro Madriz
- Succeeded by: Bruno Carranza Ramírez
- In office 8 May 1863 – 8 May 1866
- Preceded by: José María Montealegre Fernández
- Succeeded by: José María Castro Madriz

First Designate to the Presidency
- In office 8 May 1868 – 1 November 1868
- President: José María Castro Madriz
- Preceded by: José María Montealegre Fernández
- Succeeded by: Eusebio Figueroa Oreamuno
- In office 1861–1862
- President: José María Montealegre Fernández
- Preceded by: Francisco Montealegre Fernández
- Succeeded by: Julián Volio Llorente

Secretary of Foreign Affairs
- In office 17 August 1859 – 29 April 1860
- President: José María Montealegre Fernández
- Preceded by: José María Castro Madriz
- Succeeded by: Francisco Yglesias Llorente

Deputy of the Congress of the Republic for Cartago
- In office 1 May 1858 – 17 August 1859
- In office 1 May 1852 – 30 April 1855

Personal details
- Born: Jesús María Ciriaco Jiménez Zamora; 18 June 1823 Cartago, Costa Rica
- Died: 12 February 1897 (aged 73) Cartago, Costa Rica
- Party: Independent
- Spouse: Esmeralda Oreamuno Gutiérrez (m. 1850; died 1873)
- Relations: Francisco Oreamuno Bonilla (father-in-law); Agapito Jiménez Zamora (brother)
- Children: 7, including Manuel and Ricardo
- Parent(s): Ramón Jiménez y Robredo; Joaquina Zamora y Coronado
- Education: Universidad de San Carlos de Guatemala (MBBS)

Jesús María Ciriaco Jiménez Zamora (18 June 1823 – 12 February 1897) was a Costa Rican physician and politician who served as the 4th and 6th President of Costa Rica from 1863 to 1866, and from 1868 to 1870.

He was popularly elected in 1863, but dissolved Congress two months into his term of office. During his presidency he granted asylum to former Salvadoran President Gen. Gerardo Barrios, as a result of which the other four Central American governments broke off diplomatic relations with Costa Rica.

He passed on the presidency democratically to José María Castro Madriz at the end of his mandate in 1866, only to overthrow him in a coup d'état two years later and assume the office of president for a second time. This second mandate, in turn, came to an end in a coup on 27 April 1870.

Jesús Jiménez was the father of three-time President Ricardo Jiménez Oreamuno.

Political offices
Preceded by José María Montealegre Fernández	President of Costa Rica; 1863–1866	Succeeded by José María Castro Madriz
Preceded by José María Castro Madriz	President of Costa Rica; 1868–1870	Succeeded by Bruno Carranza
