= Juan Dengo =

Spanish military officer (c. 1757–1839)

- Born: c. 1757; Asturias, Spain
- Died: 11 September 1839; Heredia, Costa Rica
- Other name: Juan Manuel Dengo
- Spouse: Antonia Alarcón
- Children: Pedro Manuel Dengo Alarcón; Juan Joseph Dengo Alarcón; María Josefa Dengo y Alarcón; Tomasa Antonia Luisa Dengo y Alarcón; María Luisa de las Nieves Dengo Alarcón; María del Carmen Ramona Dengo y Alarcón; Manuel Benito Dengo y Alarcón
- Military career
- Allegiance: Spain
- Branch: Spanish Army
- Rank: Captain of Infantry (10 August 1815); Acting Sergeant Major (documented in 1817)
- Awards: Knight of the Royal and Military Order of Saint Hermenegild (2 September 1819)

Juan Dengo, also documented as Juan Manuel Dengo (Asturias, Spain, c. 1757 – Heredia, Costa Rica, 11 September 1839), was a Spanish military officer in the service of the Spanish monarchy. His career took place in Central America, within the jurisdiction of the Captaincy General of Guatemala. The Real Academia de la Historia places his birth in Spain. In Costa Rica, he was connected with military service in Cartago and with a family documented in Heredia, two inland towns. He participated in the Cartago municipal council's deliberations on independence in October 1821 and later took part in Cartago's imperialist movement of 1823. His documented career included service as major adjutant, the rank of captain, and appointment as a Knight of the Royal and Military Order of Saint Hermenegild. The staff lists of the Kingdom of Guatemala for 1820–1821 include him as sergeant major of the San Miguel Squadron.

Records of Dengo's service and family trace his presence in Costa Rica during the final years of colonial rule. After independence, he appears in proceedings concerning the imperialist movement of 1823 and in an 1827 pardon file.

== Spanish origin and Central American career ==
Genealogical research by Yves de La Goublaye de Ménorval, published by the Costa Rican Academy of Genealogical Sciences, identifies Dengo as a native of Asturias, in northern Spain, and his wife, Antonia Alarcón, as a native of Andalusia.

In conversations with Camilo Rodríguez Chaverri, published in Jorge Manuel Dengo: Memorias del padre del ICE, his descendant Jorge Manuel Dengo Obregón identified Juan Dengo as his great-great-grandfather and stated that “Dengo is a surname of Asturian origin, from Oviedo”. In the same family recollection, he dated Dengo's arrival from Spain to 1802 and described him as an artillery officer.

Other immigrants from Asturias were present in colonial Costa Rica. Ramón Villegas Palma mentions Sergeant Major Francisco de la Madriz Linares, born in Asturias around 1689 and settled in Costa Rica, where he married Rita García de Argueta. Another Asturian appears within Dengo's own sphere of activity: the merchant Pedro Antonio Solares y Berros, a resident of Heredia, declared on 2 September 1819 that he was a native of the municipality of Villaviciosa, Asturias, during proceedings conducted by Dengo.

His Spanish origins and service in Central American units place his career between Spain and Central America. His 1805 commission identifies him as first sergeant of grenadiers in the disbanded Fixed Regiment and assigns him as interim major adjutant to the Yoro Squadron, in present-day Honduras. The service-award account preserves a calculation beginning on 1 March 1798, meaning that his documented military career reaches back to the eighteenth century.

In Costa Rica, his career combined two spheres: service with the Cartago battalion, based in the seat of the provincial government during the colonial period, and family ties in Heredia, a town in the Central Valley. In Cartago he was elected paymaster for 1807 and appears as major adjutant in 1812; in Heredia, the baptisms of his children were recorded from 1807 onward, as was his burial in 1839. This distinction separates his military posting in Cartago from his family's parish life in Heredia.

== Military career ==
=== The Fixed Regiment and the Yoro militia ===
Juan Dengo is documented in the army by 1793. A return of the Fixed Infantry Regiment of Guatemala reproduced by Ana Margarita Gómez identifies him as a 36-year-old married First Sergeant from Asturias.

The 1805 commission distinguishes his former position as first sergeant of grenadiers of the “disbanded Fixed Regiment” from his new posting as interim major adjutant of the Yoro Squadron. The term “disbanded” describes the corps from which he came in that document and should not be applied to every later unit known as the Fixed Battalion of Guatemala. Indeed, the staff lists for 1820–1821 include a Fixed Battalion of Guatemala among the veteran troops and separately list the Yoro and San Miguel squadrons among the provincial dragoon militia.

Yoro is in present-day Honduras, in territory then belonging to the Captaincy General of Guatemala. The squadron was a dragoon militia unit; the post of major adjutant was distinct from the unit's senior command. The commission was issued by Antonio González Mollinedo y Saravia, Governor and Captain General of Guatemala, who declared that he had “chosen Don Juan Dengo”, identifying him immediately afterward as first sergeant of grenadiers. It was issued in Nueva Guatemala on 1 June 1805. The appointment traces Dengo's transition from grenadier sergeant to a militia adjutancy, expressly designated as interim in the 1805 commission.

=== Service award and seniority ===
The commission of 1 June 1805 describes him as first sergeant of grenadiers of the disbanded Fixed Regiment and appoints him interim major adjutant of the Yoro Squadron. A later account records a monthly award of six reales from 1 March 1798, when he was proposed for it while a sergeant of the Fixed Battalion, through 31 May 1805, the day before his promotion to interim major adjutant. The claim arose because the certificate had been lost and he had not received the award. Orders dated 7 and 13 May 1808 directed that the payment be processed after the commanders of the corps certified the proposal date.

The account documents his service as a sergeant in 1798, while the 1793 return establishes that he had already belonged to the Fixed Regiment five years earlier. If the award recognized in 1798 corresponded to fifteen completed years of service, subtraction suggests an enlistment around 1783. Based on the age of 36 recorded in 1793, he would then have been approximately 26 years old. This inference depends on the award category and the method used to calculate seniority; the date on which he was proposed for payment was not necessarily the day on which he completed the qualifying period.

=== Paymaster duties and service in Cartago ===
On 20 November 1806, Dengo was elected paymaster, with approval granted on 1 December, to serve during 1807. The election record brought together Sergeant Major Juan Manuel de Cañas and major adjutants Juan Dengo and José Prieto; Juan Francisco de Bonilla approved the appointment. The office authorized Dengo to receive the battalion's pay from the Royal Treasury and distribute it among its members. Manuel García Escalante also appears in the records of the subordinate Royal Treasury: his name is recorded in the registration of Dengo's Yoro commission on 20 September 1805. Documents from March and April 1812 identify him as major adjutant of the Cartago Battalion.

=== Rank of captain and duties of sergeant major ===
Dengo was granted the rank of captain on 10 August 1815, and the grant was subsequently registered in Guatemala in December 1819. The registered commission reproduces the formula used by Ferdinand VII: “Whereas, in consideration of the merits and services of you, Don Juan Dengo”. The text identifies him as Veteran major adjutant of the Cartago Battalion of Disciplined Militia and grants him the rank of captain of infantry. The pronoun vos in the original Spanish belongs to the formal language of a royal commission addressed to its recipient.

Detail of the registration of the royal commission by Ferdinand VII granting Dengo the rank of Captain: “Whereas, in consideration of the merits and services of you, Don Juan Dengo”. National Archives of Costa Rica, folio 304.

Certificates dated 31 December 1817 describe him as responsible for the vacant office of sergeant major.

A report by Juan Manuel de Cañas, dated 18 May 1820, reviewed his service and recommended that he receive a permanent appointment. The report also records Dengo's request for the rank of lieutenant colonel.

=== San Miguel Squadron ===
The table of staff lists for 1820–1821 published by Rodrigo Moreno Gutiérrez places Dengo in the sergeant major column for the San Miguel Squadron, among the provincial dragoon militia. San Miguel is now in El Salvador and was then also part of the Captaincy General of Guatemala. The table distinguishes the San Miguel Squadron from the Yoro Squadron and the Cartago Battalion: each represented a different posting in Dengo's career within a regional military organization. The 1820–1821 list establishes his inclusion on the San Miguel staff but does not by itself specify the date of his transfer from Costa Rica.

=== Military justice and acting command ===
In 1817, Dengo acted as a Commissioned Judge in a military case. The proceedings identify him as captain of infantry of the Royal Armies, major adjutant, and officer responsible for the duties of sergeant major. He took sworn statements, ordered the seizure of property, and asked Governor Juan de Dios de Ayala y Toledo for authorization and assistance in enforcing the order in the jurisdiction of Villa Hermosa.

In testimony from August 1819 concerning the circulation of a proclamation from Portobelo, Dengo appears as acting commander. Joaquín de Oreamuno stated that he handed the document to Dengo, who instructed him to forward it to Political Governor Ramón Jiménez y Robredo. Other proceedings in the file document Dengo's role in the investigation and his taking of testimony.

=== Relations with military, administrative, and political authorities ===
Dengo's records connect him with the authorities who exercised governmental and military command in Costa Rica during the final colonial years and the political crisis of 1823. These relationships appear in appointments, Treasury registrations, service reports, judicial proceedings, the minutes of October 1821, and testimony from the imperialist proceedings.

Among the officials with whom he served was Manuel García Escalante, who was responsible for the Royal Treasury of Cartago during the colonial period and for its administrative continuity after independence. Eduardo Madrigal Muñoz includes García among the principal administrators of the political institutions during the 1821 transition. His documented relationship with Dengo includes the registration of the 1805 commission, the October 1821 independence deliberations, and his testimony concerning the events of March 1823.

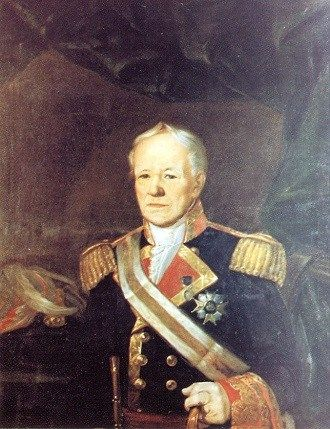
Juan Manuel de Cañas, Dengo's military superior and a participant in the Cartago deliberations of 1821.

Person	Date	Documented relationship with Dengo
José Ruperto Prieto y González del Suso	1806–1807	Major adjutant of the Cartago Battalion; he participated with Cañas and Dengo in Dengo's election as paymaster for 1807. The record places him in the same military administration responsible for receiving and distributing pay.
Juan Francisco de Bonilla	1806	Approved Dengo's appointment as paymaster on 1 December 1806.
Manuel García Escalante	1805, 1821, and 1823	His name appears in the registration of the Yoro commission in the Royal Treasury; he was summoned with Dengo to the independence deliberations and later testified that he found Dengo with Lombardo when he arrived to warn them that the barracks had been seized.
José Antonio García y Ramírez	1823	A witness in the proceedings following the imperialist movement; he placed Dengo in the Cartago barracks during its seizure on 29 March and named him among those who went to the subsequent attack.
Antonio González Mollinedo y Saravia	1805	Captain General of Guatemala who issued Dengo's appointment as interim major adjutant of Yoro.
Juan de Dios de Ayala y Toledo	1817	As governor, received Dengo's request for authorization and assistance to carry out a seizure in a military case.
Ramón Jiménez y Robredo	1819	Dengo directed that the proclamation from Portobelo be sent to him, according to Joaquín de Oreamuno's statement.
Juan Manuel de Cañas-Trujillo y Sánchez de Madrid	1820	Reported on Dengo's service and recommended him for a permanent appointment; the report also records Dengo's request for the rank of lieutenant colonel.
Joaquín de Oreamuno y Muñoz de la Trinidad	1819, 1821, and 1823	Testified about delivering the proclamation to Dengo and participated with him in the Cartago municipal council deliberations of October 1821. Fernández Guardia later attributed Dengo's appointment as sergeant major of the imperialist regime to Oreamuno.
José Santos Lombardo y Alvarado	1821 and 1823	Participated with Dengo in the municipal deliberations of October 1821. Manuel García Escalante's testimony places Dengo dining with him when news arrived that the barracks had been seized.
Agustín Barba	1821	Attended the municipal meetings of 13 and 15 October, as did Dengo; the minutes distinguish Barba's office as sergeant major of the Cartago Battalion from Dengo's at San Miguel.
Santiago Bonilla and José María de Peralta y La Vega	1821	Municipal officials present during the deliberations on the independence communications in which Dengo participated.
Pedro José de Alvarado y Baeza	1821	Ecclesiastical vicar summoned with Dengo to the meeting of 13 October.
Nicolás Carrillo y Aguirre	1821	Presided over the Council of Legates that suspended Dengo's pay because his military appointment belonged to San Miguel.
Salvador de Oreamuno	1823	Second commander of the imperialist regime; Fernández Guardia places him in command of the march toward Ochomogo in which Dengo participated.
Félix Oreamuno y Jiménez	1821 and 1823	Municipal councilman present at the October 1821 deliberations and an officer whom Fernández Guardia included in the imperialist force that marched with Dengo toward Ochomogo.
Hermenegildo Bonilla Pacheco	1823	Officer in the same imperialist force as Dengo during the march toward Ochomogo, according to Fernández Guardia.
Félix Fernández y Tenorio	1821	Commander of the Provincial Battalion. The Council of Legates session that suspended Dengo's pay instructed Fernández to distribute and discipline the troops; both men appear in that military-reorganization agreement.

=== Order of Saint Hermenegild ===
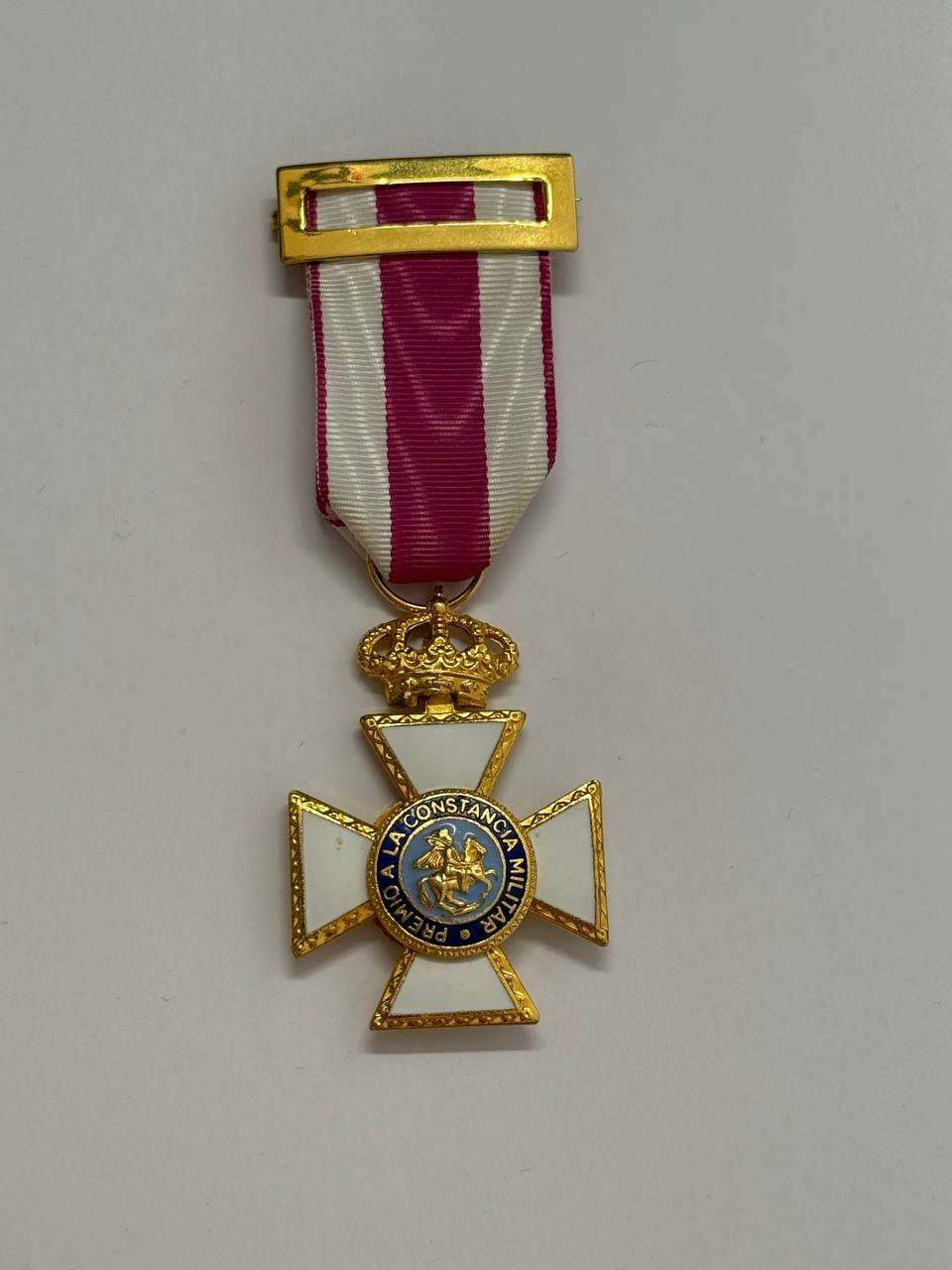
Cross of the Order of Saint Hermenegild, photographed by Nikita7544Ilin in 2025. It illustrates the insignia of the order in which Dengo was appointed a Knight in 1819.

The Royal and Military Order of Saint Hermenegild was created by Ferdinand VII by decree of 28 November 1814, after the Peninsular War. The royal decree of 19 January 1815 issued its first regulations as a reward for the steadfast military service of officers in the armies of Spain and the Indies and in the Navy.

The regulations of 10 July 1815 required twenty-five years of creditable service, at least ten as an officer, and conduct consistent with military honor. Active service included that of veteran militia adjutants and sergeant majors; the rules also provided double credit for time on campaign and certain allowances for compulsory overseas postings. Applications had to include a service record and reports from superior officers.

The insignia had white-enamel arms, a royal crown, and an image of the saint on horseback; it bore the inscription “Reward for military constancy” and Ferdinand VII's cipher on the reverse. The regulations distinguished the cross, plaque, and grand cross, each with specific requirements for seniority and office. Dengo's award was in the grade of Knight and placed his career within this system for recognizing long service.

The catalog of the National Archives of Costa Rica describes a title of Knight of the Order of Saint Hermenegild conferred on Dengo on 2 September 1819. The registration containing this information is dated 29 February 1820.

The handwritten registration states: “Title of Knight ... Don Juan Dengo ... dated 2 September 1819”. It is the administrative record of the grant, registered alongside other military commissions.

Handwritten entry recording the grant of the title of Knight of the Order of Saint Hermenegild to Juan Dengo on 2 September 1819.

The same entry mentions the title granted to Cañas on 7 August 1819. They were separate awards entered in the same administrative register.

== Participation in the independence deliberations of 1821 ==
=== Receipt of the communications from Guatemala and León ===
On 13 October 1821, after receiving mail containing Gabino Gaínza's communications concerning the independence proclaimed in Guatemala City on 15 September and the resolutions of the Provincial Deputation of León, Cañas convened the Cartago municipal council. Dengo was summoned to the meeting together with Sergeant Major Agustín Barba, ecclesiastical representatives, and Treasury official Manuel García Escalante. He was present when the independence communications were read and discussed and expressed his opinion on the response that should be given. His intervention was recorded in the municipal minutes.

The minutes of 13 October state that Dengo “fully subscribes to the opinion of Governor Don Juan Manuel de Cañas”. Cañas proposed adopting the resolution reached in León and reporting it to the National Congress in Madrid for instructions. Dengo thus supported the position of his superior during the discussion of how to respond to the new events. Fernández Guardia names him, together with Barba and Vicente Ortega, among the military officers on whose cooperation Cañas could rely during the crisis.

José María de Peralta, a participant in the municipal deliberations of October 1821.

Joaquín de Iglesias, portrayed on the commemorative page devoted to the founders of the republic.

Juan Mora Fernández, portrayed on the same commemorative page devoted to independence.

=== The vote of 15 October and his posting at San Miguel ===
Two days later, the municipal council summoned Dengo again and expressly identified him as sergeant major of the San Miguel Squadron. The minutes record that he maintained his earlier position and added that he could not expand on the matter “because he did not belong to this Prov[ince], but to that of San Mig[ue]l”. The statement referred to his provincial affiliation in the context of his military posting. The subsequent resolution annulled the earlier votes of the other participants, with the exception of those of Cañas and Dengo.

On 16 November, after the Council of Legates of the Towns had been established under the presidency of Nicolás Carrillo y Aguirre, it resolved to suspend Dengo's pay because he had been appointed sergeant major in San Miguel, in present-day El Salvador, rather than in Costa Rica. The same session considered the reorganization of the provincial forces and the formation of national militias. It directed Major Adjutant Vicente Ortega to reside in Cartago and ordered the commander of the Provincial Battalion, Félix Fernández y Tenorio, to distribute and discipline the troops.

Portrait identified as “Don Félix Fernández” in La Tribuna, 15 September 1934, p. 10. The issue was digitized by the National Library of Costa Rica and is available through SINABI.

These actions document Dengo's presence in the political deliberations and administrative transition of 1821. His later appointment under Cartago's imperialist regime belongs to the crisis of 1823.

== Participation in the imperialist movement of 1823 ==
Portrait of Joaquín de Oreamuno y Muñoz de la Trinidad, attributed on Commons to Tomás Povedano. Oreamuno appointed Dengo sergeant major to organize Cartago's imperialist forces.

=== Detention and appointment in Cartago ===
Alfonso Jiménez Rojas's Efemérides costarricenses, republished in Reproducción in 1921, recounts that in February 1823 the authorities received reports of a possible march of troops from León toward Costa Rica. The report placed Dengo at the Bejuco estate in the jurisdiction of Bagaces and prompted an order for his arrest.

In his account of independence, Ricardo Fernández Guardia suggested that the imperialists might have received instructions carried by Dengo, whom he described as having been taken to Cartago and released under confinement within the city. Fernández Guardia attributed to Joaquín de Oreamuno the appointment of Dengo as sergeant major to organize the troops supporting Cartago's imperialist regime.

=== Organization of the imperialist forces ===
According to Fernández Guardia, Joaquín de Oreamuno appointed his brother Salvador as Second Commander, Juan Freses Ñeco as Adjutant, and Dengo as sergeant major, charging them with immediately organizing the troops that would support the new regime. In describing the march toward Ochomogo, the author lists Dengo and Freses Ñeco together with Hermenegildo and Tranquilino Bonilla, Francisco Javier Peralta, Manuel de la Torre, Félix Oreamuno, Joaquín Estanislao Carazo, Juan Antonio Castro, Tomás Brenes, and Pedro Carazo. Salvador de Oreamuno led the force.

Hermenegildo Bonilla, one of the officers in the imperialist force in which Dengo served. Portrait published in La Tribuna, 15 September 1934, p. 10; digitized by the National Library of Costa Rica, SINABI.

=== Testimony concerning the seizure of the barracks ===
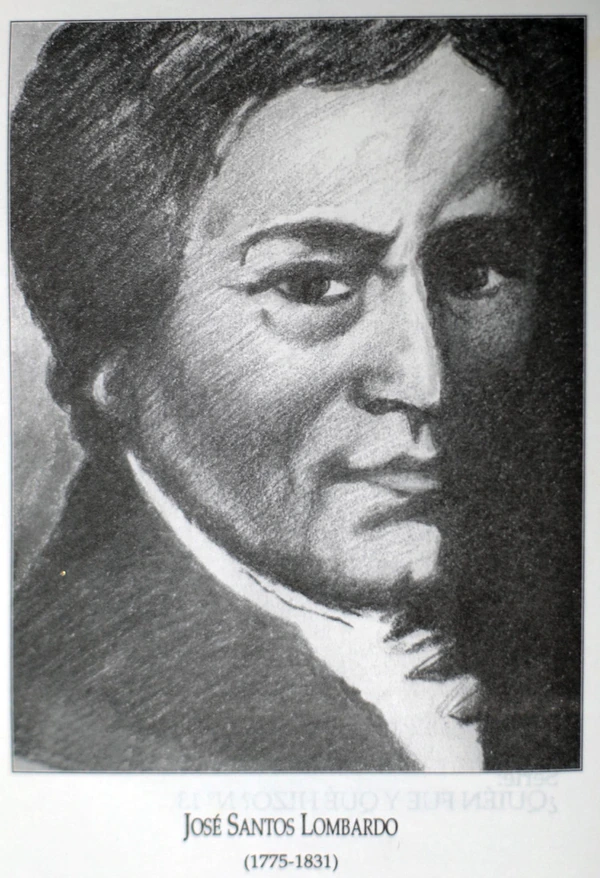
José Santos Lombardo y Alvarado, with whom Dengo was dining when Manuel García Escalante brought warning that the barracks had been seized in March 1823.

In the subsequent proceedings, José Antonio García named Dengo among those present in the Cartago barracks when it was seized on 29 March. He testified that those assembled were “shouting for the Empire”. He also named Dengo among those who joined the later attack.

Another witness, Manuel García Escalante, testified on 23 May 1823 that Dengo had been dining with Commander José Santos Lombardo y Alvarado when Escalante arrived to warn them of the seizure of the barracks.

=== Ochomogo and words attributed to Dengo ===
In his account of the Battle of Ochomogo, fought on 5 April 1823, Ricardo Fernández Guardia attributed the exclamation “Fire on those devils!” to Dengo. The author places the remark at the encounter between the imperialist and republican advance guards, while both sides were still hesitating to open fire. He recounts that, after Dengo's command, Pedro Mayorga fired on a soldier from San José who was attempting to withdraw, beginning the hostilities. Fernández Guardia then describes an attack led by Dengo from the point where the outflow of the large lagoon crossed the old road.

=== Exile and pardon ===
Fernández Guardia recounts that Dengo was sent with other imperialist prisoners to San José, where the Tobacco Factory served as an artillery barracks. In his summary of the sentences, the author includes Dengo, Juan Freses Ñeco, and Rafael Oreamuno among those condemned to perpetual exile.

Portrait identified as José Rafael Gallegos in La Tribuna, 15 September 1934.

The governmental minutes of 1823 also record arrangements for Dengo's support during his imprisonment. One resolution directed that, after the month in which Rafael Gallegos had been ordered to feed him had ended, Francisco Arrieta should continue supporting him for fifteen days.

The 1827 pardon file states that Dengo had been sentenced to exile in 1823. A decree of the State Constitutional Assembly dated 20 March 1827 allowed him to return to his family under the guarantee of Pedro Dengo and the supervision of the local authorities. The Representative Council approved the decree on 28 March. A legal report by the Legislative Assembly identifies Pedro as Juan's son and explains that the pardon took into account the father's advanced age, the circumstances of his family, and the patriotic merits of the son who requested the pardon.

== Family and later life ==
The documentation concerning the 1827 pardon also identifies Pedro Dengo as Dengo's son and as the person who requested his return from exile.

Indexes to the Heredia parish registers identify Dengo as the husband of Antonia Alarcón and the father of Tomasa Antonia Luisa, baptized on 27 June 1807; María del Carmen Ramona, baptized on 19 July 1809; and Manuel, baptized on 11 February 1812.

A Heredia parish record is indexed as Dengo's burial on 11 September 1839 and names Antonia Alarcón as his wife.

== Descendants ==
The family line of Dengo's son Benito Dengo and Antonia Bertora leads to the engineer Manuel Víctor Dengo, whose baptismal record identifies Juan Dengo and Antonia Alarcón as his paternal grandparents. Manuel Víctor was the father of educator Omar Dengo and the grandfather of engineer and politician Jorge Manuel Dengo Obregón, who participated in the founding of the Instituto Costarricense de Electricidad and served as First Vice President of Costa Rica from 1986 to 1990.

Educator María Eugenia Dengo Obregón, daughter of Omar Dengo and María Teresa Obregón Zamora and sister of Jorge Manuel, also belonged to this branch.

The public prominence of this branch of the family was discussed by La Nación in “La estirpe de los Dengo”, published on 7 September 2007 when Jorge Manuel was recognized as a Benemérito de la Patria. The article highlighted his participation in founding the Instituto Costarricense de Electricidad and his vice presidency, as well as the educational and intellectual contributions of his father Omar, whom the Legislative Assembly recognized in 1969.

=== Family trees of selected branches ===
The following charts develop two branches descending from Juan Manuel Dengo and Antonia Alarcón: the line of Tomasa Antonia Luisa Dengo y Alarcón through Federico Roberto del Carmen Carvajal Valerio, and Benito Dengo's line through Jorge Manuel Dengo Obregón and María Eugenia Dengo Obregón. Tomasa's branch reproduces the relationships in the FamilySearch family tree; Benito's branch is based on Manuel Víctor's parish record and biographical profiles of his descendants.

==== Children of Juan Manuel Dengo and Antonia Alarcón ====
The FamilySearch tree presents seven children of the couple. The dates in the table are those given in their profiles.

Child	Profile dates	Identifier
Pedro Manuel Dengo Alarcón	1795–1840	9X14-S9Y
Juan Joseph Dengo Alarcón	1796–1857	GFQK-Q4B
María Josefa Dengo y Alarcón	1803–	GLPR-231
Tomasa Antonia Luisa Dengo y Alarcón	1807–1836	L6YX-9W6
María Luisa de las Nieves Dengo Alarcón	1808–1848	GFQN-NQR
María del Carmen Ramona Dengo y Alarcón	1809–1862	LK9M-RPX
Manuel Benito Dengo y Alarcón	1812–1856	GMH3-XPZ

==== Tree of the children ====
			Juan Manuel Dengo; Antonia Alarcón
Pedro Manuel Dengo Alarcón; 1795–1840	Juan Joseph Dengo Alarcón; 1796–1857	María Josefa Dengo y Alarcón; 1803–	Tomasa Antonia Luisa Dengo y Alarcón; 1807–1836	María Luisa de las Nieves Dengo Alarcón; 1808–1848	María del Carmen Ramona Dengo y Alarcón; 1809–1862	Manuel Benito Dengo y Alarcón; 1812–1856

==== Tree of the two selected branches ====
Juan Manuel Dengo and Antonia Alarcón
Thomasa Antonia Luisa; Dengo y Alarcón; José Francisco Lizano Ulate	Manuel Benito Dengo y Alarcón; Antonia Josefa de las Mercedes; Bertora Castro
Anna Joaquina Lizano Dengo; Joaquín Campos Carvajal	Manuel Víctor de Jesús; Dengo Bertora
Paula Campos Lizano; José María Carvajal Murillo	Omar Dengo Guerrero; María Teresa Obregón Zamora
Rafael Teodoro Carvajal Campos; Petronila Valerio Mejías	Jorge Manuel Dengo Obregón	María Eugenia Dengo Obregón
Federico Roberto del Carmen; Carvajal Valerio; María Teresa de Jesús; Sánchez Chavarría

The two names in each box are the parents of the following generation. Only the selected lines are shown; the boxes do not represent all siblings in each generation.

==== Tomasa's branch ====
Generation from Juan and Antonia	Descendant	Spouse in the selected line
1	Tomasa Antonia Luisa Dengo y Alarcón	José Francisco Lizano Ulate
2	Ana Joaquina Lizano Dengo	Joaquín Campos Carvajal
3	Paula Campos Lizano	José María Carvajal Murillo
4	Rafael Teodoro Carvajal Campos	Petronila Valerio Mejías
5	Federico Roberto de Carmen Carvajal Valerio	María Teresa de Jesús Sánchez Chavarría

Source for the line: FamilySearch profile and kinship chart.

==== Benito's branch ====
Generation from Juan and Antonia	Descendant	Relationship
1	Manuel Benito Dengo y Alarcón	Husband of Antonia Josefa de las Mercedes Bertora Castro
2	Manuel Víctor de Jesús Dengo Bertora	Son of Benito and Antonia Bertora
3	Omar Dengo	Son of Manuel Víctor; husband of María Teresa Obregón Zamora
4	Jorge Manuel Dengo Obregón and María Eugenia Dengo Obregón	Children of Omar and María Teresa

Sources for the line: Manuel Víctor's parish record and profiles published by the University of Costa Rica.

==== Children of Tomasa and José Francisco Lizano Ulate ====
Tomasa married José Francisco Lizano Ulate on 20 November 1828 at the Church of the Immaculate Conception in Heredia.

Child	Profile dates	Identifier
Ana Joaquina Lizano Dengo	1828–1897	LWZG-T1L
María de Jesús Lizano Dengo	1829–1888	GSBR-WN1
Ignacio Lizano Dengo	1832–	GMZW-JVY

==== Manuel Benito's first marriage ====
The profile records his marriage to Ignacia Jacinta Carrillo Colina (1808–1839) on 2 February 1826 at La Inmaculada in Heredia.

Child	Profile dates	Identifier
Pedro Dengo Carrillo	1827–1856	9X14-SM2
Pedro Pablo Ramón Dengo	1827–	LK9M-GP4
Benito Norverto Dengo	1830–	GSBT-V6P
Juan Francisco Dengo Carrillo	1832–1875	GMH3-T5F
Benito Crisóstomo Dengo Carrillo	1838–	LK9M-GYX

==== Manuel Benito's second marriage ====
The profile records his marriage to Antonia Josefa de las Mercedes Bertora Castro (1815–1883) on 18 April 1839 at Nuestra Señora del Carmen in San José.

Child	Profile dates	Identifier
Benito José Vicente Dengo Bertora	1840–1869	GSBT-PTL
Manuel Víctor de Jesús Dengo Bertora	1842–1925	M2KK-T8W
Rafael Nicolás Dengo Bertora	1844–1918	LK9W-V6N
Higinia Josefa de los Dolores Dengo Bertora	1846–1910	9DXF-T5P
José Mateo Cecilio Dengo Bertora	1847–1881	LK9M-1K9
Victoria Mercedes Dengo Bertora	1852–1899	9DXF-B91
Mercedes de Jesús Antonia Dengo Bertora	1856–	K214-JGP

==== Pedro Manuel's family ====
The family profile lists Pedro Manuel Dengo Alarcón as the husband of María de Jesús Arguedas Conejo; they married in Cartago on 16 October 1816. The index to Santos María's baptism on 8 November 1819 expressly names him “Don Pedro Manuel Dengo”. The profile lists two children: María Dengo Arguedas (GPVL-1LT) and Santos María Dengo Arguedas (KJWD-R3N), both with the year 1819.

== Chronology of service and distinctions ==
Date	Office or distinction	Document or context
1793	First sergeant, Fixed Infantry Regiment of Guatemala	Return reproduced by Ana Margarita Gómez: age 36, married, and from Asturias.
1798–1805	Service recognized for military awards	Period calculated: 1 March 1798 – 31 May 1805.
1 June 1805	Interim major adjutant, Yoro Squadron	The commission first identifies him as first sergeant of grenadiers.
1806–1807	Paymaster	Elected 20 November 1806; approved 1 December.
1812	Major adjutant of the Cartago Battalion	Military correspondence from March and April.
10 August 1815	Rank of captain	Grant subsequently registered in Guatemala in December 1819.
1817	Duties of sergeant major	Certificates concerning the vacant office of sergeant major.
2 September 1819	Knight of the Order of Saint Hermenegild	Title recorded in the registration of 29 February 1820.
1820–1821	Sergeant major, San Miguel Squadron	Listed in the published staff lists of the Kingdom of Guatemala.
13 and 15 October 1821	Participation in the Cartago deliberations	Opinion and vote on the independence communications.
16 November 1821	Suspension of pay in Costa Rica	The Council of Legates based the decision on his appointment at San Miguel.
March 1823	Sergeant major of Cartago's imperialist regime	Appointment attributed to Joaquín de Oreamuno.

== Geographical scope ==
Place	Period	Documentary connection
Yoro, Honduras	1805	Appointment to the squadron; the commission does not by itself establish a travel itinerary.
Cartago, Costa Rica	1806–1823	Paymaster duties, battalion service, and participation in the imperialist movement.
San Miguel, El Salvador	1820–1821	Squadron on whose staff he appears as sergeant major.
Bagaces, Costa Rica	February 1823	Reported location at the Bejuco estate.
Heredia, Costa Rica	1807–1839	Parish records concerning his family and burial.

== See also ==
- Asturias
- Spanish immigration to Costa Rica
- Juan Manuel de Cañas
- Joaquín de Oreamuno y Muñoz de la Trinidad
- Battle of Ochomogo
- Royal and Military Order of Saint Hermenegild
