= S. J. Main Muñoz =

American filmmaker

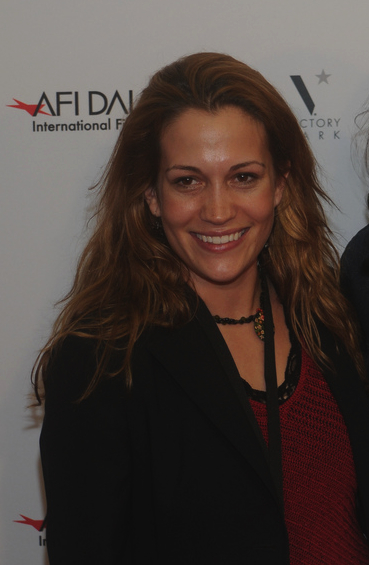
- Born: Summer Joy Main (Muñoz); San Luis Obispo, California
- Education: European Graduate School (PhD); Columbia University School of the Arts (MFA); University of California, Los Angeles (BA)
- Occupations: Film director; Screenwriter; Producer
- Years active: 2000–present
- Spouse: Derek Classen (m. 2011)
- Children: 2

Summer-Joy Main Muñoz is an American filmmaker primarily known for directing television and award-winning short films often of the Western genre or featuring Latino themes.

== Early life ==
Main Muñoz was born in San Luis Obispo, California to a Costa Rican mother (Muñoz) and Russian/Irish father (Main) and was raised in Cambria, California. At the age of eleven, Main Muñoz was featured on Star Search as a member of the dance group "Short 'n Sweet." Main Muñoz worked as a model for surf photographer Dan Merkel in the Maldives. Main Muñoz also modeled for Seventeen at the age of 17. Main Muñoz attended the UCLA Theater Department where she studied directing and acting for the theater. While attending UCLA, Main Muñoz interned at DreamWorks SKG in the Feature Development (Amblin Entertainment), Story and Casting departments.

== Early professional career ==
While completing a master's degree in directing at Columbia University, Main Muñoz worked for directors, producers and production companies including Michael Hausman of Cinehaus, and Ismail Merchant and James Ivory (director) of Merchant Ivory Productions. She has served as a Script Reader at Walden Media and Radical Media, and for other New York-based production companies. She was Executive Assistant to director Stanley Donen. Upon receipt of her master's degree in Film Directing, Main Muñoz moved to Los Angeles where she worked as a writer, director, producer, line producer, and unit production manager. Main Muñoz established the film and media production company Tica Productions in 2007.

== Awards ==
Main Muñoz's film La Cerca (The Fence) (narrated by Edward James Olmos) won Best Cinematography from Rhode Island International Film Festival and Temecula Valley International Film Festival, among other awards. It was named Best Film Honorable Mention from the Rhode Island International Film Festival and was a nominee of the Imagen Awards. Main Munoz's follow-up Western short film Requiescat also garnered awards, including the Clairmont Camera Filmmaker Grant.

== Other ==
Main Muñoz completed a Doctor of Philosophy degree (summa cum laude) at the Media and Communications Division of the European Graduate School of Switzerland. Her doctoral dissertation presents philosophy for cinema production and the role of the American Movie Producer of narrative commercial cinema.

Main Muñoz's great-grandfather is the Costa Rican musician José Daniel Zúñiga Zeledón, composer of "Caña Dulce" and other Costa Rican national folk songs.

She was formerly a regularly contributing writer to The Huffington Post on the subject of Latino Film.

Main Muñoz was the only Latina narrative director invited to join the Academy of Motion Pictures Arts and Sciences (AMPAS) in June 2020.

== Filmography ==
=== Television ===
- Pulse (Netflix)
- Seal Team (Paramount+)
- Fear the Walking Dead (AMC)
- Manifest (Netflix)
- The Cleaning Lady (Fox)
- American Horror Stories (Hulu)
- 9-1-1: Lone Star (Fox)
- The Rookie (ABC)
- Ordinary Joe (NBC)
- Chicago P.D. (NBC)
- Chicago Med (NBC)

=== Short films ===
| Year | Title | Director | Writer | Producer |
|---|---|---|---|---|
| 2019 | Don't Say No | Yes | Yes | Yes |
| 2018 | Requiescat | Yes | Yes | Yes |
| 2018 | Reconnected | Yes | Yes | Yes |
| 2017 | Ordinary Lovers | No | No | Yes |
| 2013 | The Carbon Collective | Yes | Yes | Yes |
| 2011 | Nice Guys Finish Last | No | No | Yes |
| 2009 | Three Minutes | No | No | Yes |
| 2007 | Luck of the Draw | Yes | No | Yes |
| 2006 | Bitch | No | No | Yes |
| 2005 | Trust | No | No | Yes |
| 2005 | Just A Girl | No | No | Yes |
| 2005 | La Cerca | Yes | Yes | Yes |
| 2004 | Swan Dive | No | No | Yes |
| 2003 | Day In Summer | Yes | Yes | Yes |
| 2002 | Move | Yes | Yes | Yes |
| 2001 | Love Relations | Yes | Yes | Yes |
| 2000 | Dancer on Dance | Yes | Yes | Yes |
