= List of people on the postage stamps of Costa Rica =

This is a list people who have appeared on the postage stamps of Costa Rica, many of them on multiple stamps. The entries show each person's name, a short description of their notability, and the year they first appeared on a stamp.

The list is complete up to 2022.

== A ==
- Julio Acosta, president of Costa Rica, 1920-24 (1921)
- Francisco Aguilar B., president of Costa Rica, 1919-20 (1980)
- Manuel Aguilar, president of Costa Rica, 1837-38 (1943, 1961)
- Alfonso Acosta Guzmán, promoter of forensic medicine (2015)
- José María Alfaro Zamora, president of Costa Rica, 1842–44, 1846-47 (1943, 1961)
- Alejandro Alvarado Garcia, president of the Costa Rica Court of Justice (1992)
- Felipe J. Alvarado, Founder of Rotary Club Costa Rica (1977)
- es:Pablo de Alvarado y Bonilla, doctor, Costa Rican politician and Independence leader (1971)
- Andrey Amador, cyclist (2011)
- Alonso de Anguciana de Gamboa, governor of Costa Rica (1977)
- Manuel José Arce, general and president of the Federal Republic of Central America (1971)
- Oscar Arias, Nobel Peace prize winner and president of Costa Rica 1986-90 (1987)
- Ricardo Saprissa Ayma, president of the Saprissa Soccer Club (1985)

== B ==
- Amelia Barquero, composer (2018)
- Fernando Baudrit Solera, president of the Costa Rica Court of Justice (1992)
- Benedict XVI, pope of the Catholic church (2005)
- Amadeo Quiros Blanco, comptroller of General Audit Office (1976)
- Simón Bolívar, South American liberator (1921)
- Leon Fernandez Bonilla, founder of the National Archives (1981)
- Alberto Brenes Cordoba, lawyer and judge (1961)
- Nery Brenes, sprinter (2011)
- Leonidas Briceno B., doctor (1965)

== C ==
- R. A. Calderón Guardia, president of Costa Rica, 1940-44 (1993)
- Joaquín Bernardo Calvo, politician (1957)
- Jose Maria Cañas, Costa Rican military figure (1903, 1907, 1910, 1957)
- Rodrigo Carazo Odio, president of Costa Rica, 1978-82 (1968)
- Braulio Carrillo, president of Costa Rica, 1835–37, 1838-42 (1901, 1907, 1910)
- Recaredo Bonilla Carrillo, postmaster (1963)
- Bruno Carranza, president of Costa Rica, 1870 (1943)
- Francisca Carrasco, first woman in Costa Rican military (2016)
- Pancha Carrasco, hero of independence campaign (1984)
- Ramon Castilla y Marquesado, president of Peru (1957)
- Florencio del Castillo, Costa Rican cleric and politician (1971)
- Juana de Castillo, first lady and wife of José Maria Castro (1996)
- Jose María Castro, president of Costa Rica, 1847–49, 1866-68 (1901, 1907, 1943)
- Miguel Angel Castro Carazo, educator and humanitarian (1993)
- Sandra Cauffman, electrical engineer, physicist and NASA official (2017)
- Edith Cavell, nurse (1945)
- Manuel Antonio de la Cerda, Nicaraguan politician (1971)
- Miguel de Cervantes, Spanish author (1947)
- Jesus Bonilla Chavarria, composer (1984)
- Franklin Chang-Diaz, astronaut (2003)
- Felicitas Chaverri, head of Department of Drugs and Narcotics (2019)
- Rafael A. Chaves, Costa Rican Composer (1974)
- Roberto Chiari, president of Panama (1963)
- Laura Chinchilla, president of Costa Rica, 2010-14 (2011)
- Christopher Columbus, explorer (1923)
- José Company, composer (2018)
- A. Cruz, Olympic swim team member (1996)
- Shirley Cruz, soccer player (2017)

== D ==
- Luis Davila Solera, president of the Costa Rica Court of Justice (1992)
- José Matias Delgado, leader in the independence movement of El Salvador (1971)
- Jorge Manuel Dengo, vice-president of Costa Rica (2013)
- Omar Dengo, educator (1988)

== E ==
- Mario Echandi Jiménez, president of Costa Rica, 1958-62 (1981)
- Aquileo J. Echeverria, writer (2016)
- Albert Einstein, physicist (2005)
- Aniceto Esquivel, president of Costa Rica, 1876 (1946)
- Ascensión Esquivel Ibarra, president of Costa Rica, 1902-06 (1947)

== F ==
- Justo A. Facio, professor (1960)
- Carlos Luis Fallas, author (2009)
- Gonzalo Fernandez de Oviedo, first chronicler of Spanish Indies (1978)
- Juan Mora Fernández, president of Costa Rica, 1824–33, 1837 (1901, 1907, 1910, 1943)
- Mauro Fernández, statesman (1907, 1910, 1943, 2018)
- Pacifica Fernández, first lady and wife of Juan Mora (1996)
- Prospero Fernández, general and president of Costa Rica, 1882-85 (1883, 1946)
- Valeriano Fernández, philosopher (2019)
- José Figueres Ferrer, president, 1970-74 (1998, 2006)
- Christiana Figueres, diplomat (2017)
- Eusebio Figueroa, politician (1903)
- Edward J. Flanagan, priest and founder of Boys Town (1959)
- Julio Fonseca, Costa Rican composer (1974)
- Saint Francis of Assisi, Italian Catholic friar, deacon, mystic, and preacher (1983)
- Pope Francis, head of the Roman Catholic Church (2014)

== G ==
- Hanna Gabriel, boxer (2011)
- Jose R. de Gallegos, president of Costa Rica, 1833–35, 1845-46 (1943)
- Fidel Gamboa, composer (2018)
- Mohandas Karamchand Gandhi, leader of India's Independence Movement (1998)
- Eduardo Garnier, sports promoter (1974)
- Juan Jose Ulloa Giralt, doctor (1961)
- Alfredo González Flores, lawyer and president of Costa Rica, 1914-17 (1964)
- Cleto Gonzalez Viquez, president of Costa Rica, 1906–10, 1928-32 (1941, 1947, 1959)
- Carmen Granados, humorist (1999)
- Tomas Guardia, president of Costa Rica, 1870–1876, 1877-82 (1943)
- Tomás Soley Güell, economist and historian (1974)
- Fernando Centeno Güell, poet and educator (2008)
- Agustin Gutierrez L., lawyer (1961)
- Benjamin Gutierrez, composer, conductor and pianist (1984)
- Manuel M. Gutierrez, Costa Rican composer (1923)

== H ==
- Paul Harris (Rotary), founder of Rotary International (1977)
- Dionisio de Herrera, head of state of Honduras and head of state of Nicaragua (1971)
- Rubén Odio H., archbishop of San José (1962)
- Vicente Herrera Zeledón, president of Costa Rica, 1876-77 (1946, 1961)
- Rowland Hill, postal reformer and originator of the postage stamp (1979)

== I ==
- Isabella I of Spain, queen of Spain (1952)

== J ==
- Jesús Jiménez, president of Costa Rica, 1863–66, 1868–70, 1932-36 (1901, 1907, 1910, 1923)
- Ricardo Jimenez Oreamuno, president of Costa Rica, 1910–14, 1924-28 (1947, 1959)
- Pilar Jimenez, composer (1984)
- John Paul II, pope of the Roman Catholic Church (2003)

== K ==
- John Fitzgerald Kennedy, US president (1963)
- John F. Kennedy Jr., son of US president (1965)
- Robert Koch, German physician and microbiologist (1982)

== L ==
- Roman Macaya Lahmann, aviation pioneer (1988)
- Antonio Larrazabal, Guatemalan priest and diplomat (1971)
- Miguel Larreinaga, Nicaraguan philosopher, humanist, lawyer and poet (1971)
- Charles Lindbergh, aviator (2003)
- Juan Manuel Lopez del Corral, priest (1982)
- St Louisa de Marillac, co-founder, with Vincent de Paul, of the Daughters of Charity (1960)
- Carmen Lyra, author (1998)

== M ==
- Casiano de Madrid, priest (1965)
- es:Rodrigo Arias Maldonado, Spanish military officer (1924)
- Nelson Mandela, president of South Africa (2015)
- Alberto Martén, economist, Solidarity Movement founder (2009)
- Jose Marti, Cuban poet and national hero (1995)
- Julio Mata, Costa Rican composer (1974)
- Roberto Brenes Mesen, educator and writer (1974)
- Luis Molina, ambassador (1957)
- Pedro Molina, Guatemalan politician (1971)
- Alejandro Monestal, Costa Rican composer (1974)
- J. García Monge, writer and educator (1981)
- Luis Alberto Monge Alvarez, president of Costa Rica, 1982-86 (1968)
- Jose M. Montealegre, president of Costa Rica, 1959-63 (1945)
- Alberto M. Brenes Mora, botanist (1961)
- Manuel Mora, social guarantee leader (1993)
- Jose Joaquin Mora, hero of independence campaign (1957, 1984)
- Juan Rafael Mora, president of Costa Rica, 1849-59 (1901, 1907, 1921, 1931, 1943, 1957, 1984)
- Francisco Morazán, president of Costa Rica, 1842 (1943)

== N ==
- Carmen Naranjo, writer (2019)
- Florence Nightingale, nurse (1945)
- Alfred Nobel, industrialist and founder of the Nobel Peace Prize (2007)
- Solon Nunez Frutos, public health pioneer (1992)

== O ==
- Miguel Obregon L., educator and founder of the national library system (1961)
- Alberto Montes de Oca D., champion sharpshooter (1974)
- Eunice Odio, poet (2019)
- Daniel Oduber Quiros, president of Costa Rica, 1974-78 (1986)
- Eusebio Figueroa Oreamuno, politician (1907, 1910)
- Francisco Maria Oreamuno, president of Costa Rica, 1844 (1943, 1957)
- Yolanda Oreamuno, writer (2016)
- Francisco J. Orlich Bolmarcich, president of Costa Rica, 1962-66 (1963, 1986)

== P ==
- María París, Olympic swim team member (1996)
- José Francisco de Peralta, priest and politician (1960)
- Pedro Pérez Zeledón, jurist and diplomat (1982)
- Juana Pereira, peasant woman who inspired First Church of Our Lady of the Angels (1977)
- Clodomiro Picado, developer of antivenins (2019)
- Teodoro Picado Michalski, president of Costa Rica, 1944-48 (1981)
- Oscar J. Pinto F., soccer introducer (1974)
- Henri François Pittier, founder of the National Geographic Institute (1989)
- Max Planck, physicist (2005)
- Claudia Poll, Olympic swim team member (1996)
- Silvia Poll, Olympic swim team member (1996)

== Q ==
- José Manuel Quirós y Blanco, general and national hero (1957)

== R ==
- Domingo Rivas, vicar of the Cathedral of San Jose (1978)
- F. Rivas, Olympic swim team member (1996)
- Julio Rivera, president of El Salvador (1963)
- Jose Rodriguez, president of Costa Rica, 1890-94 (1941)
- Miguel Ángel Rodríguez, president of the Organization of American States (2004 )
- Abelardo Rojas, founder of the cornea bank (1981)
- Elias Rojas Roman, doctor (1961)
- Franklin Delano Roosevelt, US president (1947)
- Nicolaas Rubens, Lord of Rameyen, son of painter Peter Paul Rubens (1962)
- Bryan Ruiz, soccer player (2011)

== S ==
- Andrés Sáenz Llorente, medical doctor (1961)
- Caridad Salazar, children's writer (2018)
- José de San Martin, soldier, independence leader and statesman (1978)
- Víctor M. Sanabria Martínez, priest and social guarantees leader (1993)
- Juan Santamaría, national hero (1901, 1907, 1910, 1957, 1984)
- Benito Serrano Jimenez, president of the Costa Rica Court of Justice (1992)
- Luis Somoza, president of Nicaragua (1963)
- Bernardo Soto Alfaro, doctor and president of Costa Rica, 1885-90 (1887, 1889, 1946)
- Heinrich von Stephan, founder of the Universal Postal Union (1981)
- Antonio José Sucre, Venezuelan independence leader (1995)

== T ==
- Bernardo A. Theil, bishop (1948)
- Federico Tinoco G., dictator of Costa Rica, 1917-19 (1980)
- Jose Joaquin Trejos Fernandez, president of Costa Rica, 1966-70 (1986)
- Esteban Lorenzo de Tristan, priest (1982)

== U ==
- Otilio Ulate Blanco, president of Costa Rica, 1949-53 (1981)
- Juan José Ulloa Giralt, medical doctor (1961)
- Guadalupe Urbina, composer (2018)

== V ==
- Antonio Vallerriestra, military officer (1957)
- José Cecilio del Valle, philosopher, politician, lawyer, and journalist of Honduras (1971)
- Carlos Luis Valverde, doctor (1950)
- Joaquin Vargas Calvo, Costa Rican composer (1974)
- Ramón Villeda Morales, president of Honduras (1963)
- St Vincent de Paul, saint and chaplain to the poor (1960)
- Julián Volio, politician (1903, 1907, 1910)

== Y ==
- Miguel Ydigoras, president of Guatemala (1963)
- R. Yglesias, Olympic swim team member (1996)
- Rafael Yglesias Castro, president of Costa Rica, 1894-1902 (1947, 1948)

== Z ==
- José Maria Zeledon Brenes, composer of the national anthem (1980)
- Jose Daniel Zuniga Zeledon, musician (1984)

== Sources ==
- Scott Standard Postage Stamp Catalogue, Volume 2A, ©2021, Amos Media Co., Sidney, OH
- Stanley Gibbons Stamp Catalogue, Part 15, 3rd Edition, © 2007, Stanley Gibbons Inc.
- Michel Übersee-Katalog Band 3: Südamerika ©2001, Schwaneberger Verlag GMBH
- Costa Rica Postal Catalog, Third Edition ©2004, Hector A. Mena, Society for Costa Rica Collectors
