= Germán Serrano Pinto =

Costa Rican politician (1940–2016)

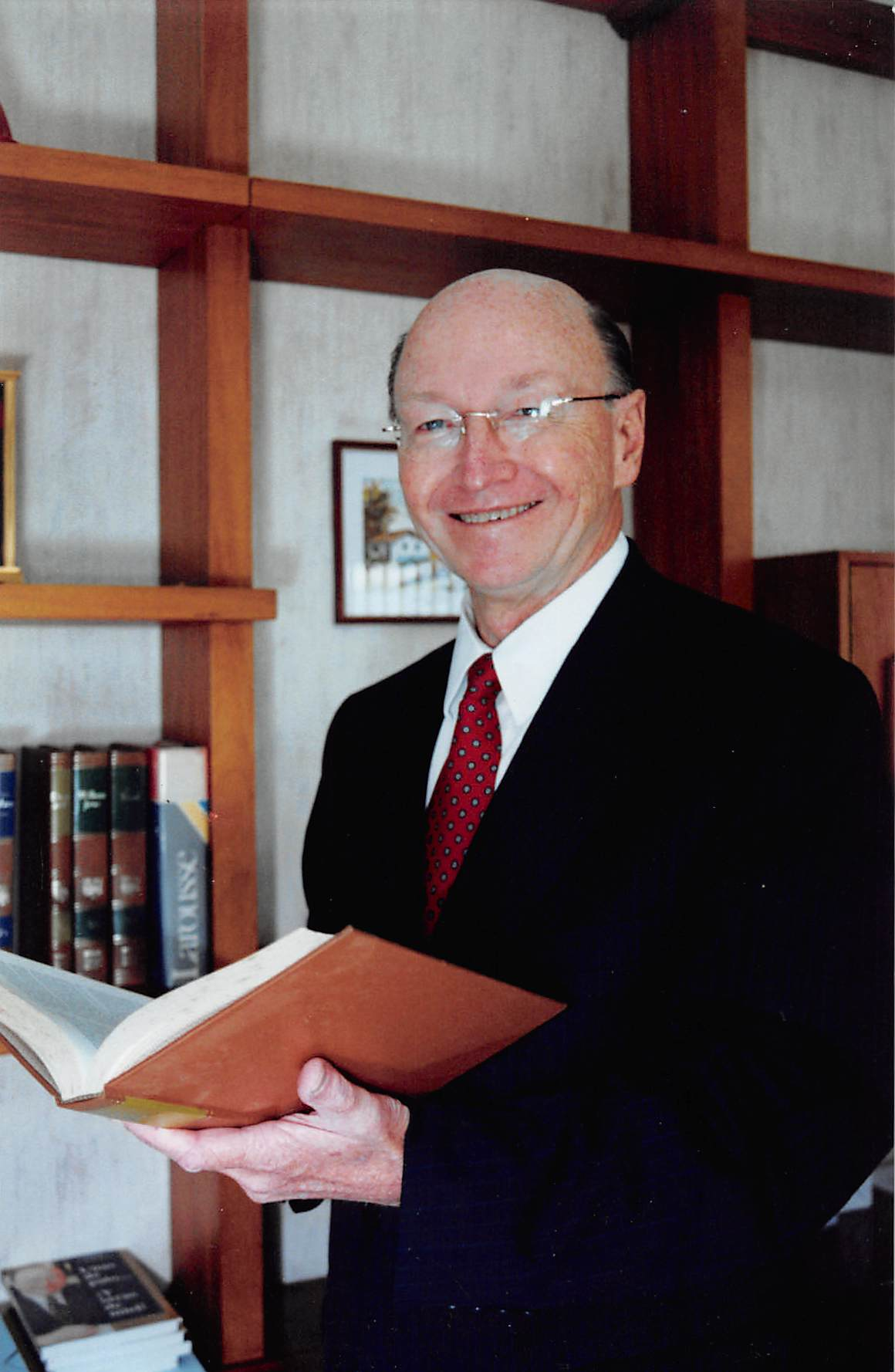
- Serrano in 2004

First Vice President of Costa Rica
- In office 8 May 1990 – 8 May 1994
- President: Rafael Ángel Calderón Fournier
- Preceded by: Jorge Manuel Dengo Obregón
- Succeeded by: Rodrigo Oreamuno Blanco

President of the National Insurance Institute
- In office 8 July 2002 – 20 April 2004
- President: Abel Pacheco de la Espriella
- Preceded by: Mónica Nágel Berger
- Succeeded by: Luis Javier Guier Fischel
- In office 8 May 1978 – 1980
- President: Rodrigo Carazo Odio

President of Correos de Costa Rica
- In office 8 May 1998 – 8 May 2002
- President: Miguel Ángel Rodríguez

Minister of Labor and Social Security
- In office 1979 – 8 May 1982
- President: Rodrigo Carazo Odio
- Preceded by: Estela Quesada Hernández
- Succeeded by: Guillermo Sandoval Aguilar

Personal details
- Born: Germán Serrano Pinto; 20 March 1940 San José, Costa Rica
- Died: 21 May 2016 (aged 76) San José, Costa Rica
- Party: PUSC (1983–2016)
- Other political affiliations: Unity Coalition (1977–1983); UN (1965–1977)
- Education: University of Costa Rica (LLB)

Germán Serrano Pinto (30 March 1940 – 21 May 2016) was a Costa Rican lawyer and politician who served as First Vice President of Costa Rica from 1990 to 1994. A member of the Social Christian Unity Party, he previously served as Minister of Labor and Social Security from 1978 to 1981. He died on 21 May 2016.
