= Postage stamps and postal history of Costa Rica =

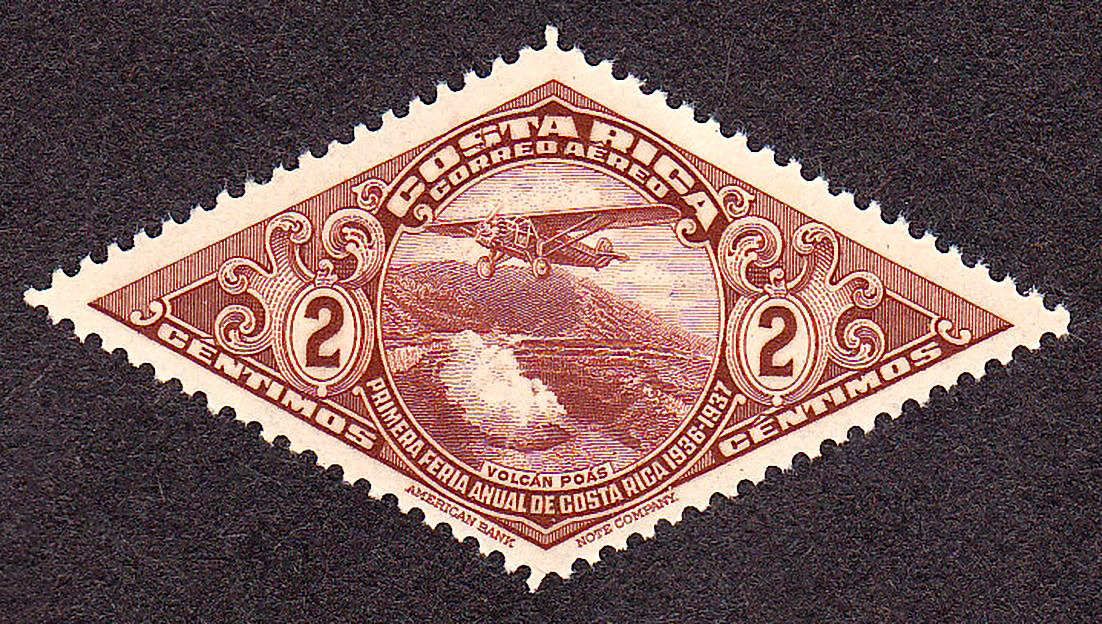
A 1937 diamond-shaped stamp of Costa Rica

This is a survey of the postage stamps and postal history of Costa Rica.

Costa Rica is a country in Central America, bordered by Nicaragua to the north, Panama to the east and south, the Pacific Ocean to the west and south and the Caribbean Sea to the east.

== First issue (reales) ==
Costa Rica has produced its own stamps since 1863.

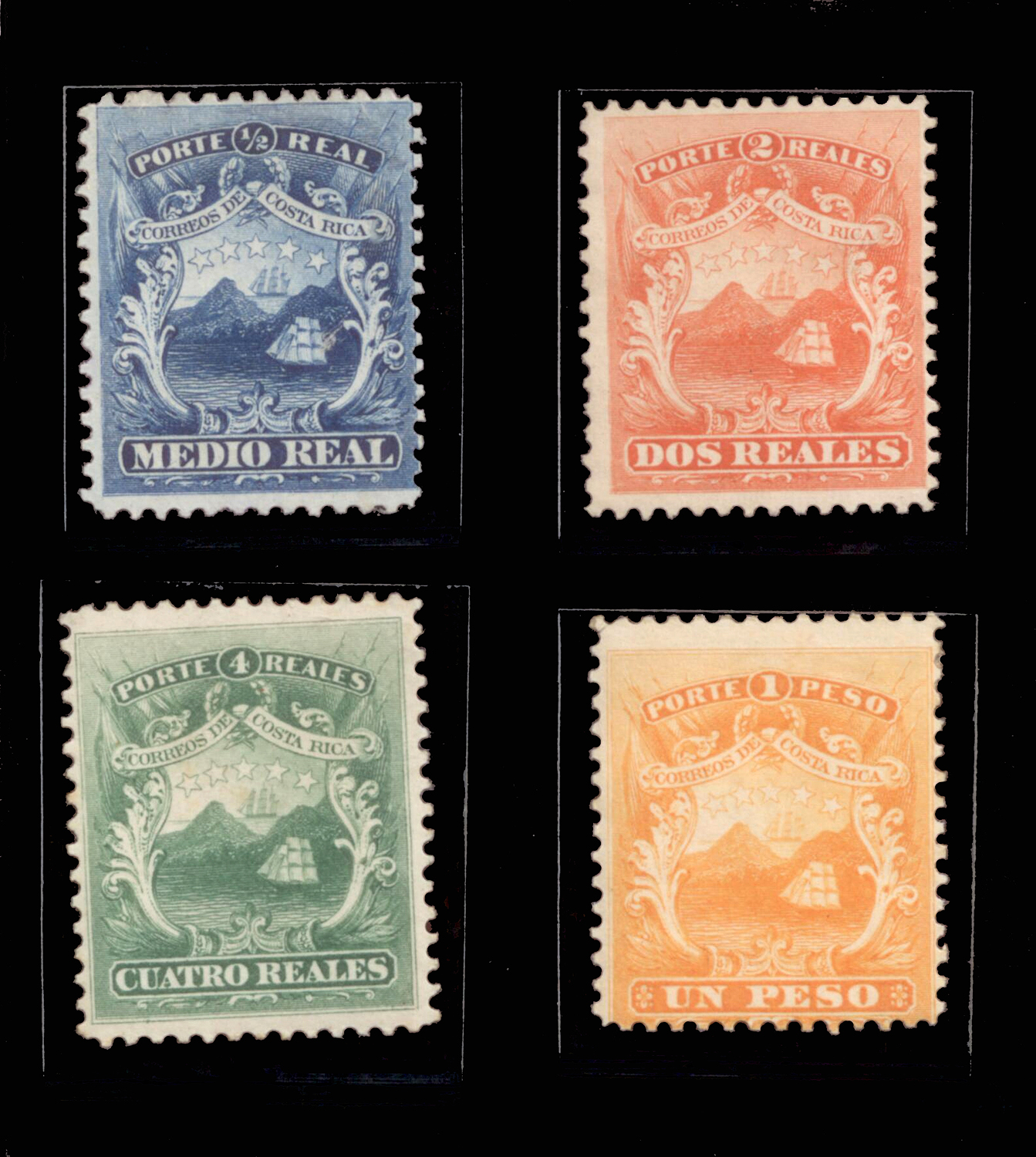
First series of 1863

The first issue of stamps was printed by the American Bank Note Company, and consisted of values "medio real" (blue), "dos reales" (red), "cuatro reales" (green) and "un peso" (orange).

In 1883, following the change in currency from reales to the new pesos and centavos, the issue of 1863 was surcharged with new values for postal use: 1 centavo, 2 centavos, 5 centavos (all over the medio real stamp), 10 centavos (over dos reales) and 20 centavos (over cuatro reales). The 5, 10 and 20 centavos were also surcharged "U.P.U."

== Guanacaste Province overprints ==
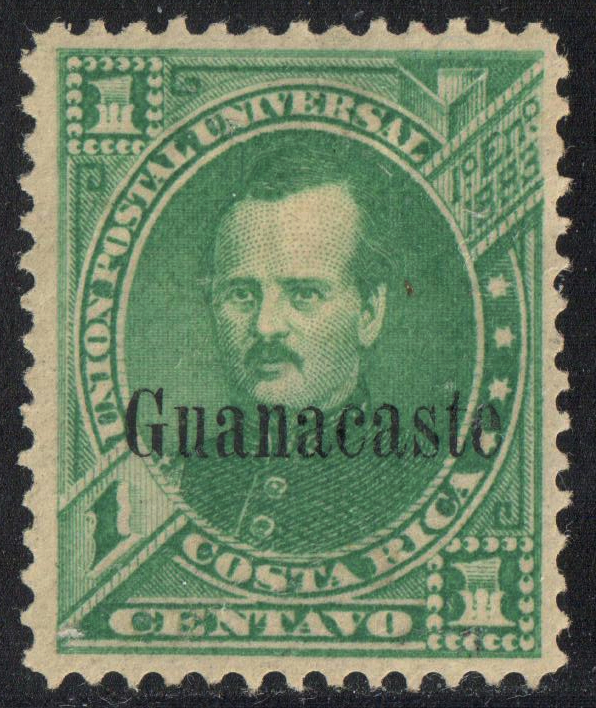
1885 Guanacaste issue

Costa Rican stamps were issued overprinted "Guanacaste" in 1885-89 following war with Nicaragua over the sovereignty of Guanacaste.

== First colón currency issue ==
The first issue in the new colón currency was dated 1900 and put into circulation in 1901. It consists of ten stamps with values ranging from 1 céntimo up to 10 colones. The colón currency had been introduced in 1896, but stamps with the old currency were still in use, and continued to be used after 1901 for several years.

== Airmail stamps ==
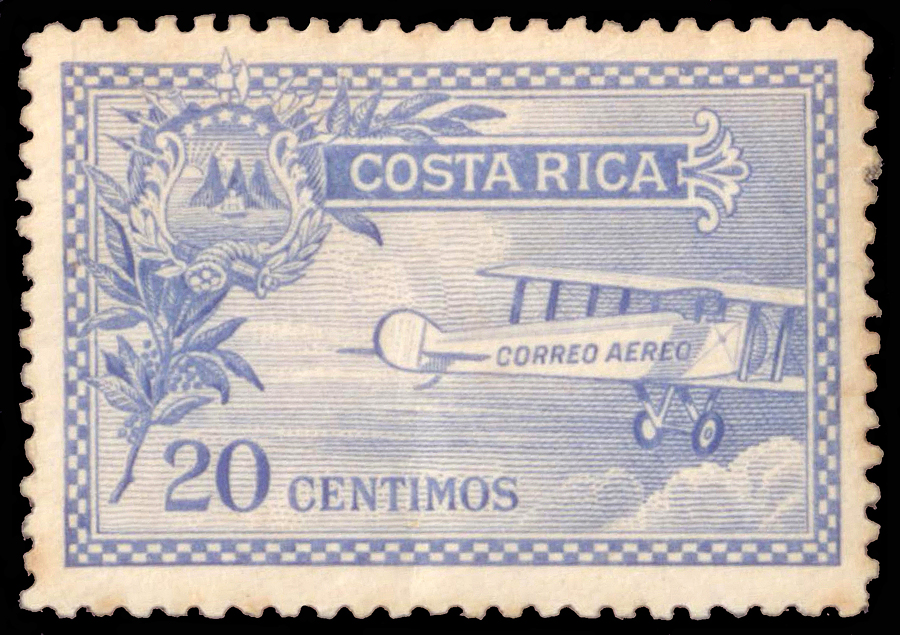
A 1926 airmail stamp of Costa Rica

== High value and rare stamps ==
- 1863 cuatro reales stamp, green, surcharged "20 cts. U.P.U."
- 1901 Juan Mora Fernández stamp, red and black, face value 2 céntimos, center inverted.

== See also ==
- Society of Costa Rica Collectors
- Correos de Costa Rica
- Edificio de Correos and Philatelic Museum
- List of people on stamps of Costa Rica
