= FIAF =

FIAF may refer to:

- Fasting-Induced Adipose Factor or ANGPTL4, a protein
- Fédération Internationale des Archives du Film or International Federation of Film Archives, a Paris-based association of film archivists
- Finnish Air Force
- Fleet Intelligence Adaptive Force, a U.S. military intelligence unit reporting to Navy Cyber Forces
- French Institute Alliance Française, a New York-based organization for the promotion of Francophone culture
- La Federación Interamericana de Filatelia, a philatelic organisation for North and South America
