= Julio Fonseca =

Julio Fonseca may refer to:

- Julio Fonseca (composer) (1885–1950), Costa Rican composer
- Julio Fonseca (footballer) (fl. 1965–1974), Honduran footballer
