= Latino (demonym) =

Word used in the United States for people with cultural ties to Latin America

Latino (masculine) and Latina (feminine) as a noun refer mainly to Latin Americans or descendants of Latin Americans living in the United States. As an adjective, the terms refer to things as having ties with Latin America. The related term Hispanic usually includes Spanish Americans too, whereas Latino as a noun sometimes does not. Latino/Latina might include Brazilians, while Hispanic does not. In spite of these distinctions, the terms Latino and Hispanic are often used interchangeably. Preference for Hispanic or Latino varies based on factors such as age and geography.

Usage of the term is mostly limited to the United States and Canada. Latin American people usually refer to themselves by national origin and rarely as Latino as the region does not have a cohesive identity. Because of this, many Latin American scholars, journalists, and Indigenous-rights organizations have objected to the mass-media use of the word to refer to all people of Latin American background.

== Origins ==
The terms Latino and Latina originated in Ancient Rome. In the English language, the term Latino is a loan word from American Spanish. Its origin is generally given as a shortening of latinoamericano, Spanish for 'Latin American'. The Oxford English Dictionary traces its usage to 1946.

Latino has its origins in the French term Amérique latine, coined in the mid-19th century during the Second Mexican Empire to identify areas of the Americas colonized by Romance-speaking people and used to show affinity with French allies during the Mexican Empire, also termed the Mexican intervention.

By the late 1850s, with the loss of California to Anglo-Americans or the United States, owing to the Mexican–American War, the term latino was being used in local California newspapers such as El Clamor Publico by Californios writing about America latina and Latinoamerica, and identifying themselves as latinos as the abbreviated term for their "hemispheric membership in la raza latina".

== Usage ==
=== Community usage ===
Both Hispanic and Latino are generally used to denote people living in the United States. Marcelo M. Suárez-Orozco and Mariela Páez write that "Outside the United States, we don't speak of Latinos; we speak of Mexicans, Cubans, Puerto Ricans, and so forth." In Latin America, the term latino is not a common endonym and its usage in Spanish as a demonym is restricted to the Latin American-descended population of the United States, but this is not always the case. The exception is Spain where latino is a common demonym for immigrants from Latin America. Sociologist Salvador Vidal‑Ortiz and literary scholar Juliana Martínez write that after the U.S. census introduced Hispanic in the 1970s, Latino emerged as "a term of resistance to the explicit colonial relations that 'Hispanic' sets between Spain and countries in Latin America".

=== Governmental usage ===
The U.S. government Office of Management and Budget (OMB) has defined Hispanic or Latino people as "a person of Cuban, Mexican, Puerto Rican, South or Central American, or other Spanish culture or origin, regardless of race". The U.S. census uses the ethnonym Hispanic or Latino to refer to "a person of Cuban, Mexican, Puerto Rican, South or Central American, or other Spanish culture or origin regardless of race". The Census Bureau also explains that "[o]rigin can be viewed as the heritage, nationality group, lineage, or country of birth of the person or the person's ancestors before their arrival in the United States. People who identify their origin as Hispanic, Latino, or Spanish may be of any race." Hence the U.S. census and the OMB are using the terms differently. The U.S. census and the OMB use the terms interchangeably, where both terms are synonyms. According to a study by the Pew Research Center, the majority (51%) of Hispanic and Latino Americans prefer to identify with their families' country of origin, while only 24% prefer the term Hispanic or Latino.

=== Style guides ===
The AP Stylebook recommends usage of Latino for persons of Spanish-speaking ancestry, as well as persons "from – or whose ancestors were from – ... Latin America, including Brazilians". However, in the recent past, the term Latinos was also applied to people from the Caribbean region, but those from former French, Dutch and British colonies are excluded.

=== Contrast with Hispanic ===
Whereas Latino designates someone with roots in Latin America, the term Hispanic in contrast is a demonym that includes Spaniards and other speakers of the Spanish language.

The term Latino was officially adopted in 1997 by the United States Government in the ethnonym Hispanic or Latino, which replaced the single term Hispanic: "Because regional usage of the terms differs – Hispanic is commonly used in the eastern portion of the United States, whereas Latino is commonly used in the western portion."

U.S. official use of the term Hispanic has its origins in the 1970 census. The Census Bureau attempted to identify all Hispanics by use of the following criteria in sampled sets:

- Spanish speakers and persons belonging to a household where Spanish was spoken
- Persons with Spanish heritage by birth location
- Persons who self-identify with Latin America, excluding Brazil, Haiti and French Guiana

Neither Hispanic nor Latino refers to a race, as a person of Latino or Hispanic ethnicity can be of any race. Like non-Latinos, a Latino can be of any race or combination of races: White, Black or African American, Asian American, Native American or Alaskan Native, Native Hawaiian or other Pacific Islander American, or two or more ethnicities. While Brazilian Americans are not included with Hispanics and Latinos in the government's census population reports, any Brazilian American can report as being Hispanic or Latino since Hispanic or Latino origin is, like race or ethnicity, a matter of self-identification.

Other federal and local government agencies and non-profit organizations include Brazilians and Portuguese in their definition of Hispanic. The U.S. Department of Transportation defines "Hispanic Americans" as: "persons of Mexican, Puerto Rican, Cuban, Dominican, Central or South American, or other Spanish or Portuguese culture or origin, regardless of race". This definition has been adopted by the Small Business Administration as well as by many federal, state, and municipal agencies for the purposes of awarding government contracts to minority owned businesses. The Congressional Hispanic Caucus and the Congressional Hispanic Conference include representatives of Spanish and Portuguese descent. The Hispanic Society of America is dedicated to the study of the arts and cultures of Spain, Portugal, and Latin America. Each year since 1997 the International Latino Book Award is conferred to the best achievements in Spanish or Portuguese literature at BookExpo America, the largest publishing trade show in the United States. The Hispanic Association of Colleges and Universities, which proclaims itself the champion of Hispanic success in higher education, has member institutions in the U.S., Puerto Rico, Latin America, Spain, and Portugal.

The American Heritage Dictionary maintains a distinction between the terms Hispanic and Latino:

Though often used interchangeably in American English, Hispanic and Latino are not identical terms, and in certain contexts the choice between them can be significant. Hispanic, from the Latin word for "Spain," has the broader reference, potentially encompassing all Spanish-speaking peoples in both hemispheres and emphasizing the common denominator of language among communities that sometimes have little else in common. Latino—which in Spanish and Portuguese means "Latin" but which as an English word is probably a shortening of the Spanish word latinoamericano—refers more exclusively to persons or communities of Latin American origin. Of the two, only Hispanic can be used in referring to Spain and its history and culture; a native of Spain residing in the United States is a Hispanic, not a Latino, and one cannot substitute Latino in the phrase the Hispanic influence on native Mexican cultures without garbling the meaning. In practice, however, this distinction is of little significance when referring to residents of the United States, most of whom are of Latin American origin and can theoretically be called by either word.

The AP Stylebook also distinguishes between the terms Hispanic and Latino. The Stylebook limits the term Hispanic to people "from – or whose ancestors were from – a Spanish-speaking land or culture". It provides a more expansive definition, however, of the term Latino. The Stylebook definition of Latino includes not only people of Spanish-speaking ancestry, but also more generally includes persons "from – or whose ancestors were from – . . . Latin America". The Stylebook specifically lists "Brazilian" as an example of a group which can be considered Latino.

There were 28 categories tabulated in the 2000 United States census: Mexican, Puerto Rican, Cuban, Dominican, Central American: Costa Rican, Guatemalan, Honduran, Nicaraguan, Panamanian, Salvadoran, Other Central American; South American: Argentinian, Bolivian, Chilean, Colombian, Ecuadorian, Paraguayan, Peruvian, Uruguayan, Venezuelan, Other South American; Other Hispanic or Latino: Spaniard, Spanish, Spanish American, All other Hispanic or Latino.

=== Debates ===
The use of the term Latino, despite its increasing popularity, is still highly debated among those who are called by the name. Since the adoption of the term by the U.S. Census Bureau and its subsequent widespread use, there have been several controversies and disagreements, especially in the United States and, to a lesser extent, in Mexico and other Spanish-speaking countries. Many Latin American scholars, journalists, and indigenous-rights organizations have objected to the mass-media use of the word Latino, pointing out that such ethnonyms are optional and should be used only to describe people involved in the practices, ideologies, and identity politics of their supporters. Journalist Rodolfo Acuña writes:

When and why the Latino identity came about is a more involved story. Essentially, politicians, the media, and marketers find it convenient to deal with the different U.S. Spanish-speaking people under one umbrella. However, many people with Spanish surnames contest the term Latino. They claim it is misleading because no Latino or Hispanic nationality exists since no Latino state exists, so generalizing the term Latino slights the various national identities included under the umbrella.

== Gender-neutral forms ==
Attempts have been made to introduce a gender-neutral term by changing the ending of Latino, as in the terms Latin@, Latine, Latino/a, and Latinx. Both supporters and opponents of Latinx have cited linguistic imperialism as a reason for supporting or opposing the use of the term.

== See also ==
- Chicano
- Latin American Australians
- Latin American Canadians
- Latin Union
- Latino diaspora
- Latino (disambiguation)
- Latino studies
- List of Latinos in film
- Race and ethnicity in the United States Census
- Racial and ethnic demographics of the United States
