= Álvaro Bonilla Lara =

Costa Rican lawyer and philatelist (1903–1988)

- Born: 3 November 1903
- Died: 1988 (aged 84–85)
- Occupation: Lawyer

Álvaro Bonilla Lara (3 November 1903 – 1988) won the Lichtenstein Medal in 1965. He was a lawyer by profession. Bonilla Lara was a member of the Society of Costa Rica Collectors and an expert on the revenue stamps of Costa Rica. In 1998, his History of the Revenue Stamps of Costa Rica (1870-1970) was updated by Héctor R. Mena and Oscar C. Rohrmoser as the Costa Rica Revenue Stamp Catalogue (ISBN 0964524767).

Bonilla Lara was twice president of La Federación Interamericana de Filatelia and joined the Roll of Distinguished Philatelists in 1967.

== Selected publications ==
- "Los sellos de Telegrafos" in Chile Filatelico, No. 170, Junio de 1968, pp. 68-70.
- History of the Revenue Stamps of Costa Rica (1870–1970). Baton Rouge, La. Society of Costa Rica Collectors, 1996. ISBN 0-9645247-3-2

A fuller listing of articles by Bonilla Lara on Costa Rican revenue philately may be found in Riley's Fiscal Philatelic Literature Handbook, June 1997.

== See also ==
- Postage stamps and postal history of Costa Rica
