= Capture of Oaxaca =

Battle during the War of Mexican Independence

- Part of the Mexican War of Independence
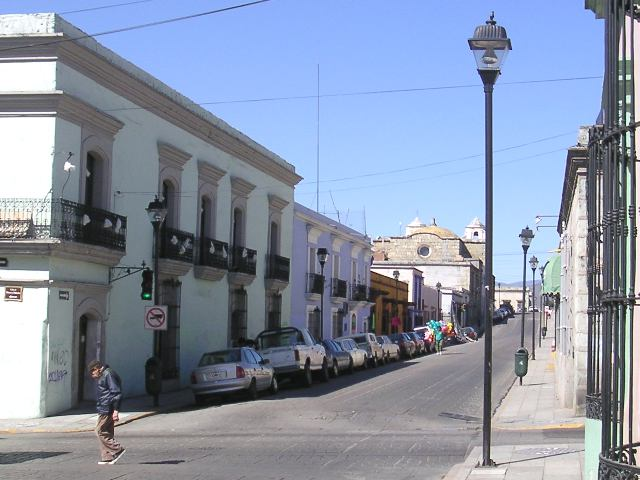
- A street view from the colonial part of Oaxaca, taken by Morelos in 1812.
Date	25 November 1812
Location	Oaxaca, Oaxaca, Mexico
Result	Mexican Insurgent victory

Belligerents
Mexican Insurgents	Spanish Empire

Commanders and leaders
José María Morelos y Pavón; Gen. Hermenegildo Galeana; Gen. Víctor Bravo; Gen. Miguel Bravo; Gen. Nicolás Bravo; Gen. Juan Pablo Galeana de los Ríos; Gen. Mariano Matamoros y Guridi; Colonel Vicente Ramón Guerrero Saldaña; Colonel José Miguel Ramón Adaucto Fernández y Félix; Colonel Ramón Sesma; Colonel Manuel de Mier y Terán; Colonel Manuel Montaño	Viceroy Félix María Calleja del Rey; Gen. Antonio Pío González-Saravia Mollinedo

Strength
~5,000 soldiers	2,000 soldiers

The Capture of Oaxaca was a battle during the War of Mexican Independence that occurred on 25 November 1812 at Oaxaca, Oaxaca. It was fought between the royalist forces loyal to the Spanish crown, commanded by General Antonio Pío González-Saravia Mollinedo, and the Mexican insurgents fighting for independence from the Spanish Empire, commanded by José María Morelos y Pavón. The battle resulted in a victory for the Mexican insurgents.

== Context ==
José María Morelos was in Tehuacán, Puebla, he discovered that loyalist Spanish troops were en route to attack him. He decided to regroup his forces and abandon Tehuacán. The organization of the insurgent army under Morelos was under the following of his generals; Hermenegildo Galeana, Víctor Bravo Miguel Bravo, Nicolás Bravo, Juan Pablo Galeana de los Ríos, Mariano Matamoros y Guridi, and his colonels; Vicente Guerrero (future president of Mexico), and José Miguel Ramón Adaucto Fernández y Félix. All of his forces were able to join creating an army of over 5,000 soldiers and 40 pieces of artillery. This army proceeded to march to Oaxaca on 10 November 1812.

Before departing for Oaxaca, Morelos named the substitute for Leonardo Bravo who had fallen prisoner to royalist troops. He decided to promote Mariano Matamoros to Bravo's former position, naming him marshal of the army and Morelos' direct second in command, having to take control of insurgent forces in the event of Morelos' capture or killing. After his arrival at Villa de Etla, Oaxaca, Morelos developed a plan to attack the state capital at Oaxaca. He sent an ultimatum to the Spanish defender of the city, General González Saravia asking for his immediate surrender. The message went unanswered and Morelos decided to take the city by force.

== Battle ==
On 25 November 1812, the insurgent forces took position and began their assault. Colonel Manuel Montaño marched up the surrounding mountainside to the Cerro de la Soledad to cut the town's water supply and to impede any retreat in that direction by way of Santo Domingo Tehuantepec. General Hermenegildo Galeana took command of the vanguard; Miguel Bravo took command of the center column; Mariano Matamoros y Guridi commanded the rearguard. For his part, Morelos himself commanded a section of cavalry. A good portion of the infantry remained in reserve to be used if necessary later in the battle.

The fort at Cerro de la Soledad, which was at that time in Spanish loyalist control, was able to check the main advance for some time with its artillery cover barrages. Morelos, thinking that his position was unfavorable for attack, sent the colonels Ramón Sesma and Manuel de Mier y Terán to take the fort on the mountain. They attempted to move a cannon close to the fort to assist in their attack but soon discovered that they were under heavy fire from two sides and abandoned the gun. Morelos thereafter decided to simply reinforce the main advance by Mier and Terán until their objective was at last completed.

Once that position had been taken by the insurgents, the main attack on Oaxaca began supported by an eight-pound cannon. The royalist troops initially returned fire but as the battle progressed, they were unable to sustain the firepower until the town's defender ordered a retreat. The last skirmish, referred to as the Juego de Pelota (literally: ball game), was the taking of a fortified position that was surrounded by a moat and trenches. Insurgent forces were initially hesitant to advance on the well fortified position until Guadalupe Victoria hurled his sword across the pit exclaiming - ¡va mi espada en prenda, voy por ella! (There goes my sword, I will go and get it!). Swimming across the moat, he incited his comrades to follow him, eventually taking the position successfully.

The loss of Oaxaca was a significant strategic victory for the insurgents and a severe setback for the Viceroyalty of New Spain. For the insurgents, it signified the military prestige and prowess of Morelos as an effective battle commander and gave the insurgents a viable geographic position from which to control the surrounding area.
