= María Teresa Obregón Zamora =

Costa Rican politician

- Born: 7 March 1888; Alajuela, Costa Rica
- Died: 29 September 1956 (aged 68); San José, Costa Rica
- Other names: María Teresa Obregón, María Teresa Obregón de Dengo, María Teresa de Dengo
- Occupation(s): Educator, Politician
- Years active: 1906-1956
- Known for: One of the first three female Deputies in Costa Rica, co-founder of the National Liberation Party and teacher's association

María Teresa Obregón Zamora (1888-1956) was a teacher, suffragist and politician in Costa Rica. She was part of the group that formed the Asociación Nacional de Educadores (ANDE) (National Association of Educators) and fought for women's enfranchisement. After winning the vote, she helped found the National Liberation Party of Costa Rica and was one of the first three women elected as a Deputy of the Legislative Assembly of Costa Rica. In 2002, Obregón was honored as one of the inaugural group of women inducted into La Galería de las Mujeres de Costa Rica (The Women's Gallery of Costa Rica).

== Early life ==
María Teresa Obregón Zamora was born on 7 March 1888 in Alajuela, Costa Rica. Her parents were teachers and she was the niece of the educator and founder of the national library, Miguel Obregón Lizano. After completing her primary education at Escuela Central in Alajuela, Obregón attended the Colegio Superior de Señoritas, earning her teaching credentials in 1905.

== Career ==
Obregón began teaching the following year at the Escuela Superior de Niñas N° 2 (Girl's High School #2), which later became Escuela Julia Lang (Julia Lang High School). She taught at the school until 1916 and the following year married the educator and intellectual Omar Dengo Guerrero, who was the first director of the country's Normal School. The couple had four children, Jorge Manuel, Omar, Gabriel and María Eugenia and raised them in the city of Heredia. Jorge (1918-2012) would become Vice President of Costa Rica, Gabriel (1922–1999) would become an acclaimed geologist and María Eugenia (1926-2014) became an educator, Minister of Education and Dean of the Education Faculty at the University of Costa Rica. During the early years Obregón was raising her family, she did not teach, but collaborated with her husband in literary and student magazines, such as Universo and Nosotros. Dengo died in 1928 and Obregón returned to teaching to support her family. She first taught elementary students at the Argentine School of Heredia and then in 1929 began teaching at the Normal School of Costa Rica, while she was studying for her examinations to become a professor. Passing the tests in 1932, Obregón became the geography and guidance professor at the Normal School. After four years of teaching at the Normal School, she moved to San José and taught at the Escuela República del Perú, where she remained until her retirement in 1941.

After her retirement, Obregón continued to teach privately and began working with activists and organizers to improve the education system and political access of women in the country. She was one of the co-founders of the Asociación Nacional de Educadores (ANDE)(National Association of Educators) and she served on the Board of Education for San José. In 1943, she joined with students and women in the protests known as the "Women of May 15" to oppose prohibitions to women's political participation and press for suffrage. In 1947, Obregón joined Emma Gamboa and they organized a group of women including Clarisa Blanco, Rosario Brenes de Facio, Amalia Chavarría de Rossi, Claudia Cortés, Aurelia Pinto de Ross, María del Rosario Quirós Salazar, Etilma Romero de Segura, Cristina Salazar de Esquivel, and Marta Uribe de Pagés to demonstrate with around 5,000 other participants against electoral irregularities and fraud in the upcoming election in 1948. The elections sparked the Costa Rican Civil War and at war's end, women finally gained the right to vote and participate in politics.

Between 1948 and 1952, Obregón served in the Ministry of Education overseeing baccalaureate exams and in 1951 served as a delegate of the Inter-American Commission of Women. That same year, she became a co-founder of the National Liberation Party (Spanish: Partido Liberación Nacional (PLN)) and headed the Women's Committee for the party. Obregón was one of the first three women delegates to win a seat in the Costa Rican legislature, when in 1953, the first election in which women were allowed to vote, she, Ana Rosa Chacón and Estela Quesada won seats in the House of Deputies. She served as first Secretary of the Board of the Legislative Assembly and is credited as the first woman to deliver a speech in the Legislative Assembly. Obregón died in office on 29 September 1956 before her term had expired.

== Legacy ==
In 2002, Obregón was inducted into La Galería de las Mujeres de Costa Rica (The Women's Gallery of Costa Rica) as one of the inaugural group of women for her contributions to education and founding of the national teacher's association. The National Development Plan adopted in 2010, to improve the infrastructure and guide the country's governance, bears her name.
