= Society of Costa Rica Collectors =

Philatelic society of Central America

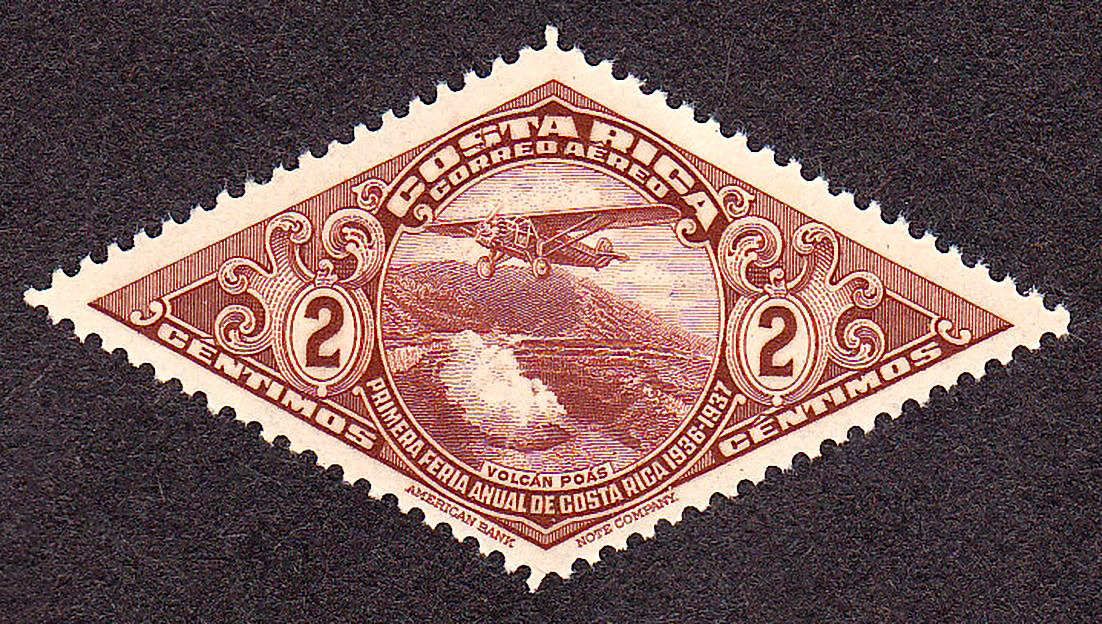
A 1937 diamond-shaped stamp of Costa Rica.

The Society of Costa Rica Collectors (SOCORICO) (founded 1963) is an international philatelic society dedicated to the study of the postage stamps and postal history of Costa Rica. SOCORICO is affiliate No. 96 of the American Philatelic Society. The society journal, The Oxcart, has been published since 1960 and succeeded the Costa Rican Philatelist which had been published since the 1950s.

== Selected publications ==
- Bonilla Lara, Alvaro. (1996) History of the Revenue Stamps of Costa Rica (1870-1970). ISBN 0-9645247-3-2
- Mena, Hector R. and Rohrmoser, Oscar C. (1998) Costa Rica Revenue Stamp Catalogue. ISBN 0-9645247-6-7
- Mena, Hector R. et al. (2004) 3rd edn. Costa Rica Postal Catalogue.

== See also ==
- Postage stamps and postal history of Costa Rica
