= James Mazepa =

American philatelist

Dr. James Peter Mazepa (born 1941) is an American philatelist who was appointed to the Roll of Distinguished Philatelists in 2015. Mazepa specialises in the philately of Poland and Mexico and is an internationally accredited philatelic judge. He received the Luff Award in 2010 from the American Philatelic Society.

Mazepa was president of the Federación Interamericana de Filatelia from 2008 to 2014.
