= Imagen Awards =

Award given to Latino entertainment

- Current: 2026 Imagen Awards
- Awarded for: Excellence in film and television by the Latino community
- Country: United States
- Presented by: Imagen Foundation
- First award: 1985; 41 years ago
- Website: Awards website

The Imagen Awards are administered by the Imagen Foundation, an organization dedicated to "encouraging and recognizing the positive portrayals of Latinos in the entertainment industry." To be considered for an Imagen Award, a media piece or person must go through an entry process. Helen Hernandez is president of the Imagen Foundation.

== History ==
In 1983, Helen Hernandez met with prolific television writer and producer Norman Lear. "Lear was acutely aware of the near absence of positive portrayals of Latinos in the entertainment industry and understood the importance of positive images. The two met with leaders of the National Conference for Community and Justice, a respected non-sectarian human relations organization committed to fighting prejudice and racial tensions".

The result was the Imagen Foundation Awards competition (or Imagen Awards), established in 1985.

Past honorees include such entertainment industry professionals as Andy García, Antonio Banderas, Phil Roman, Edward James Olmos, Bill Melendez, Rita Moreno, Jennifer Lopez, Selena Gomez and Héctor Elizondo.

== Award categories ==
=== Current ===
- Best Feature Film
- Best Director – Feature Film
- Best Actor – Film
- Best Actress – Film
- Best Supporting Actor – Film
- Best Supporting Actress – Film
- Best Animated Film
- Best Voice-Over Actor – Film
- Best Music Composition for Film or Television
- Best Documentary
- Best Informational Program
- Best Short/Student Film
- Best Commercial Advertisement or Social Awareness Campaign
- Best Drama Series
- Best Comedy Series
- Best Special or TV Movie
- Best Director – TV
- Best Actor – Drama
- Best Actress – Drama
- Best Supporting Actor – Drama
- Best Supporting Actress – Drama
- Best Actor – Comedy
- Best Actress – Comedy
- Best Supporting Actor – Comedy
- Best Supporting Actress – Comedy
- Best Young Actor
- Best Youth Programming
- Best Voice-Over Actor
- Best Variety or Reality Show

=== Previous ===
These categories were awarded in the past along with some of the current categories.

- Best Primetime Television Program
- Best Primetime Program: Special or Movie-of-the-Week
- Best Actor/Television
- Best Actress/Television
- Best Supporting Actor/Television
- Best Supporting Actress/Television
- Best Young Actor/Television
- Best Young Actress/Television
- Best Children's Programming
- Best National Informational Program
- Best Local Informational Program
- Best On-Air Advertising
- Best Web Series: Drama
- Best Web Series: Comedy
- Best Web Series: Reality or Informational

== Award ceremonies ==
- 1985–2009
- 2010 Imagen Awards
- 2011 Imagen Awards
- 2012 Imagen Awards
- 2013 Imagen Awards
- 2014 Imagen Awards
- 2015 Imagen Awards
- 2016 Imagen Awards
- 2017 Imagen Awards
- 2018 Imagen Awards
- 2019 Imagen Awards
- 2020 Imagen Awards
- 2021 Imagen Awards
- 2022 Imagen Awards
- 2023 Imagen Awards
- 2024 Imagen Awards
