= Federación Interamericana de Filatelia =

- Formation: November 8, 1968; 57 years ago
- Type: Philately

Federación Interamericana de Filatelia (FIAF), founded 8 November 1968, is an umbrella organisation for philately in North and South America.

== Presidents ==
Past presidents include:

- Emilio Obregón, México.
- Herbert Moll, Perú.
- Álvaro Bonilla Lara, Costa Rica. (twice)
- Manuel M. Risueño, Chile.
- Harry Sutherland, Canada.
- Rómulo Lander, Venezuela.
- Jairo Londoño Tamayo, Colombia.
- Elio Mario Sinich, Argentina.
- Enrique Oscar Buttini, Argentina.
- Euclydes Pontes, Brasil. (twice)
- Roberto Rosende, United States.
- Enrique Oscar Buttini, Argentina.
- Luis López López, Venezuela.
- Hugo Goeggel, Colombia.
- James Mazepa, United States
- Patricio Aguirre, Chile.

== See also ==
- Fédération Internationale de Philatélie
