= Antonio Pío González-Saravia Mollinedo =

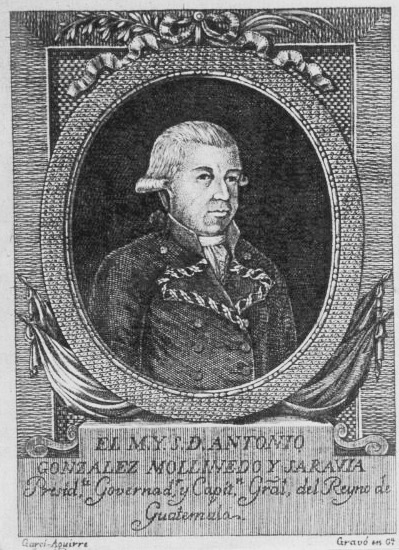
Captain General Antonio Pío González-Saravia Mollinedo

Antonio Pío González-Saravia Mollinedo (11 July 1743 Salamanca – 2 December, 1812 Oaxaca) was a Peninsular Spanish noble and Spanish loyalist Lt. General during the Mexican War of Independence. He is best known for his command over the defenses of the city of Oaxaca in 1812 when the Mexican insurgents under José María Morelos y Pavón captured the city for the independence movement.
