= Ramón Jiménez y Robredo =

Costa Rican politician

Ramón Jiménez y Robredo was a Costa Rican politician. He was Lieutenant Governor of the Province of Costa Rica in 1819, during the government of Ferdinand VII of Spain.

In June 1819, after the death of Governor Juan de Dios de Ayala y Toledo, Jiménez y Robredo took the military government of Costa Rica.

Jiménez y Robredo married to Joaquina Zamora y Coronado, and their son, Jesús Jiménez Zamora, was President of Costa Rica from 1863 to 1866, and from 1868 to 1870.

== Bibliography ==
- Cartago. Serge Lancel. Crítica, 1992. ISBN 978-84-7423-633-0. (in Spanish)
- Cartago. Werner Huss. Acento, 2001. ISBN 978-84-483-0614-4. (in Spanish)
