= Correos de Costa Rica =

National postal service of Costa Rica

Correos de Costa Rica S.A.
- Type: State-owned enterprise
- Industry: Courier
- Founded: 10 December 1839
- Headquarters: San José, Costa Rica
- Key people: Mauricio Rojas Cartin
- Products: First Class mail, Domestic Mail, Express Mail, e-commerce, Technology
- Number of employees: 1800 (2016)
- Website: correos.go.cr

Correos de Costa Rica is the national postal service of Costa Rica.

== History ==
The establishment of Correos de Costa Rica gained momentum with the Costa Rican constitution of 1824, which mandates that the Congress of the Republic must open roads and carry posts and general mail. On December 10, 1839, via government decree, the first rulebook for mail was drafted and the “Servicio Nacional de Correos” was created.

The first emission of postage stamps was done in 1862. A year later Costa Rica attended the Postal Congress in Paris, the only Latin-American country to attend the event. In August 1883 Costa Rica subscribed to the Universal Postal Union. In 1922 the country joined the Unión Postal Panamericana, integrated with Spain, Portugal, and various Latin-American countries.

On March 23, 1868, during the government of Jesús Jiménez Zamora, a contract was signed between the Secretaría de Fomento and Lyman Reynold with the intent of setting up a telegraphic connection in Cartago, San José, Heredia, Alajuela and Puntarenas. This project was concluded by the government in 1869, due to the resignation of the contractor. Telegraphy based in the Morse system ceased operating in 1970, and was substituted with the teleprinter or Telex system.

Law number 7768, of April 24, 1998, transformed the institution into what is now known as Correos de Costa Rica S.A., a public company structured as a for-profit enterprise, not dependent on the central government.

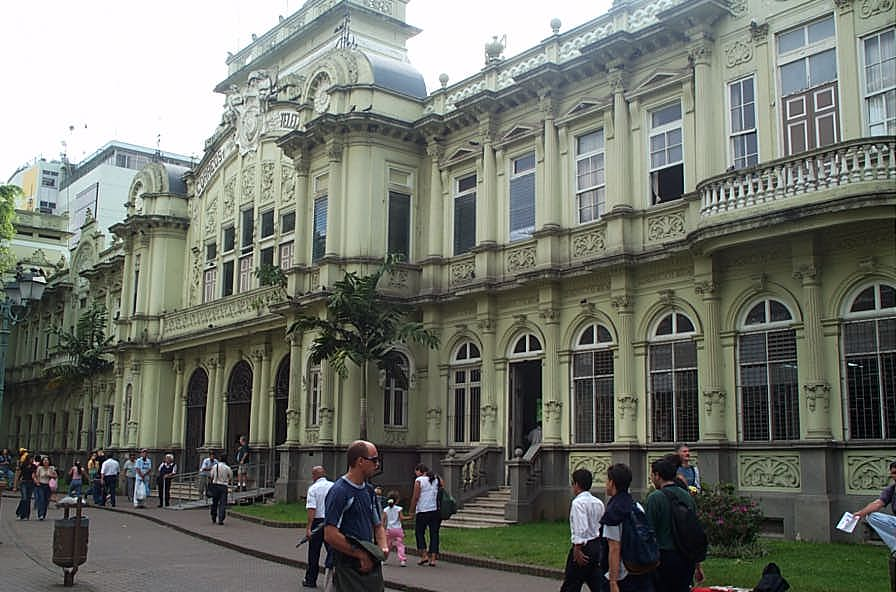
Edificio de Correos in San Jose

The downtown building of Correos de Costa Rica was built in 1917. It was built by The English Construction C.O. Ltda. It was declared as a Valuable Historical Building on October 14, 1980. It also houses the Museo Filatélico de Costa Rica (Philatelic Museum).

== Diversification ==
In the 2010 decade the company diversified its offerings with the introduction of the freight forwarding service "Box-Correos" which assists Costa Ricans who wish to shop online with a virtual US address. It also facilitates various government services such as delivery of passports and property certifications.

In the year 2018 the operation of the smart locker system known as API was started. The network has 173 locations in the metropolitan area of Costa Rica.
