= Jorge Manuel Dengo Obregón =

Costa Rican politician and engineer (1918–2012)

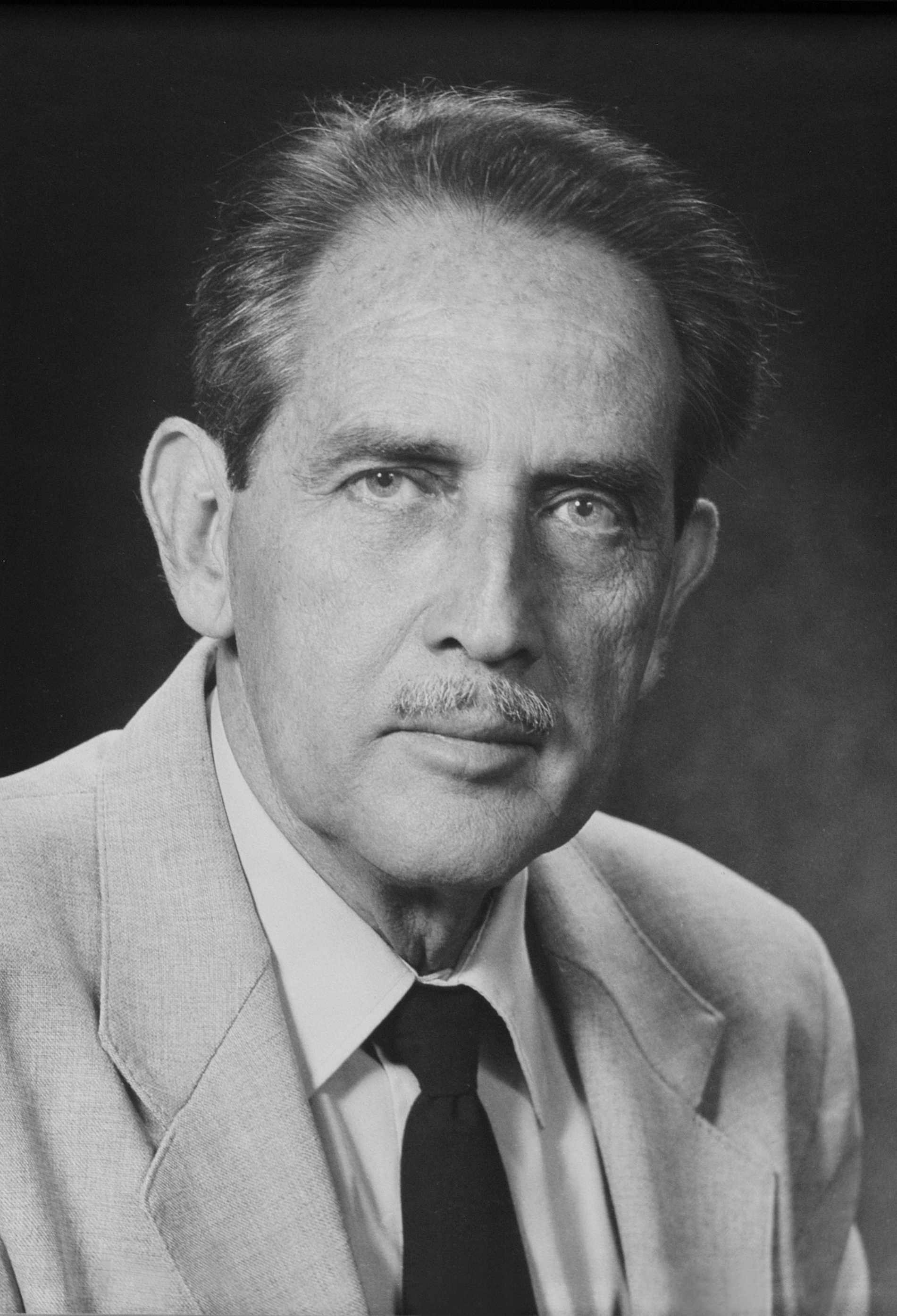

First Vice President of Costa Rica
- In office 8 May 1986 – 8 May 1990
- President: Óscar Arias Sánchez
- Preceded by: Alberto Fait Lizano
- Succeeded by: Germán Serrano Pinto

Minister of Exports
- In office 1983–1985
- President: Luis Alberto Monge
- Preceded by: Position established
- Succeeded by: José María Figueres (1986)

Vice President of the Central American Bank for Economic Integration
- In office 1966–1976

Director General of the National Planning Office
- In office 1963 – 16 January 1965
- President: Francisco Orlich Bolmarcich
- Preceded by: Bernal Jiménez Monge
- Succeeded by: Rodolfo Silva Vargas

General Manager of the Costa Rican Institute of Electricity
- In office 25 May 1949 – 1960
- President: José Figueres Ferrer; Otilio Ulate Blanco; José Figueres Ferrer; Mario Echandi Jiménez
- Preceded by: Position established

Personal details
- Born: Jorge Manuel Omar de Jesús Dengo Obregón; 19 February 1918 Heredia, Costa Rica
- Died: 23 January 2012 (aged 93) San Pedro, Costa Rica
- Party: PLN
- Parent(s): Omar Dengo; María Teresa Obregón
- Education: University of Minnesota (BE)
- Occupation: Civil engineer; politician

Jorge Manuel Omar de Jesús Dengo Obregón (19 February 1918 – 23 January 2012) was a Costa Rican civil engineer and statesman who served as First Vice President of Costa Rica from 1986 to 1990. A member of the National Liberation Party, he previously served as a Vice President of the Central American Bank for Economic Integration from 1966 and 1976. He played a leading role in the founding of the Costa Rican Electricity Institute in 1949, and of EARTH University in 1986.

== Personal life ==
He was born in Heredia, Costa Rica on 19 February 1918 to teachers Omar Dengo and María Teresa Obregón Zamora and was one of the founders of the Instituto Costarricense de Electricidad in 1949 and became its first General Manager. He later served as Director General of the National Planning Office from 1963 until his resignation in January 1965.

On 23 January 2012, he died in the age of 93.

== Awards and honors ==
- In 2012, he was presented with an Outstanding Lifetime Achievement Award in Public Works by the American Society of Civil Engineers for his public service in engineering and economic development in Central America.
- He was also the recipient of the Honorary Degree of Doctor of Laws by University of Minnesota.
- The Highest Technology Award in Costa Rica, Jorge Manuel Dengo Award is named after him. It was created by XXI Century Strategy Award Organization.
