= Estela Quesada =

Costa Rican lawyer (1924–2011)

- Born: Estela Quesada Hernández; 24 June 1924; Alajuela, Costa Rica
- Died: 18 March 2011 (aged 86); Alajuela, Costa Rica
- Occupation(s): feminist, suffragette, politician, attorney
- Years active: 1945–1991
- Known for: one of 1st three women elected to the Costa Rican legislature

Estela Quesada (1924–2011) was a Costa Rican teacher, lawyer and politician. She was one of the first three women elected to the Costa Rican legislature in the first election after women attained enfranchisement. She was the first woman to hold a cabinet-level position in Costa Rica as Minister of Education and was later the first woman to serve as minister of Labor and Social Security. She was inducted into the National Women's Institute Gallery as an Outstanding Woman of Costa Rica in 2009.

== Biography ==
Estela Quesada Hernández was born on 24 June 1924 in Alajuela, Costa Rica to Augusto Quesada Cabezas and Eneida Hernández Sanabria She attended schools first at Escuela Bernardo Soto and then the Instituto de Alajuela, before attaining her teaching license from Escuela Normal de Heredia. She was one of the first two teachers who taught at the Escuela Juan Chavez Rojas in the rural areas of what is now Ciudad Quesada which was in such a remote part of San Carlos at the time that she had to travel via river and horseback. There was no secondary education opportunity in the area, so she founded a Complementary School, as her which eventually became the Liceo San Carlos.

She returned to Alajuela and began studying law at the University of Costa Rica, while simultaneously teaching at the Escuela León Vargas. In the late 1940s, she participated in the push for the right to vote for women and when it successfully passed in 1949, she began to look at politics. In 1950, she was promoted to serve as president of the National Education Association (ANDE). 1953 was a landmark year for Quesada, as she finished her law degree and won one of the first three seats ever awarded to a woman in the Costa Rican legislature. She earned the title of vice president of the legislature, and in 1957 became the first woman in the country's history to lead the work of parliament. When Mario Echandi Jiménez was elected president, he appointed Quesada as the first Minister in the country's history. As Minister of Education, she instituted a merit based system for teacher hirings, removed dress codes which were costly, improved public education and specifically focused on improving rural education completion rates.

After the completion of her elected term, Quesada moved to San Francisco, California, where she headed the Costa Rican consulate and represented the country at the United Nations for a decade. She returned to the Canton of San Carlos and opened a law practice and was elected to serve as head of the Municipality of San Carlos from 1970 to 1974. Upon the election of President Rodrigo Carazo Odio she was again called to serve at the federal level and became the first woman to lead the Ministry of Labor and Social Security. In 1991, she mounted a challenge to the Supreme Tribunal of Elections and won her case charging that the executive and legislative branches of the country had been unconstitutionally managing debt. It was a landmark decision for Costa Rica, but she declined the chance to run for vice president after her victory.

Throughout her long career, she earned many awards and honors. Her work was recognized by ANDE in 1986, she was honored by the Pan American Round Table in 2003, the bar association honored her as Lawyer of the Week in 2005, Municipality of Alajuela designated her as Favorite Daughter of the 2007 International Day Woman celebration, among many other awards. The National Women's Institute and the Board of Social Protection joined to name her as one of the "Outstanding Women of Costa Rica" in 2009.

Quesada died on 18 March 2011 in Costa Rica.
