= Omar Dengo =

Omar Dengo Guerrero
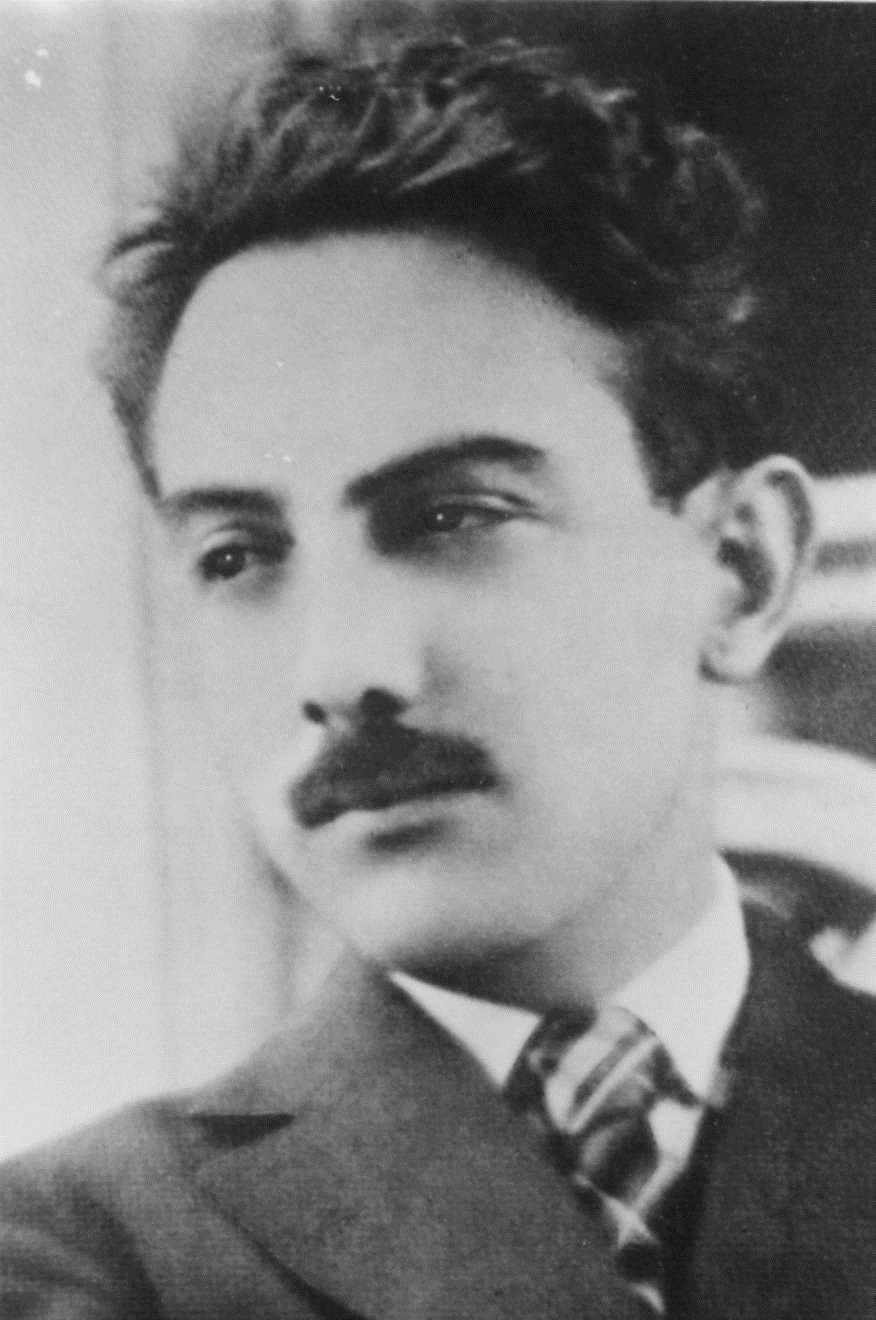
- Born: 9 March 1888; San José, Costa Rica
- Died: 18 November 1928 (age 40); Heredia, Costa Rica

Omar Dengo Guerrero (9 March 1888 – 18 November 1928) was a Costa Rican teacher, journalist, writer, lawyer and anarchist. He is considered a major figure in the history of Costa Rican education.

== Biography ==
Born in San José on 9 March 1888. He graduated from with a degree in humanities from the Liceo (English: School) de Costa Rica in 1908, and gained a degree in law by 1911. He worked as a journalist while studying, founding the newspaper Sanción in November 1908 that advocated against the Costa Rican oligarchy and in favour of workers.

He helped organised the first Labor Day celebrations in Costa Rica. He was notable for his criticism of the United Fruit Company and manufacture of liquor by the Costa Rican state. He helped found the Centro Germinal and became a teacher by 1913. He was later named director of the Costa Rican Normal School and was a professor of pedagogy. In 1917 he married fellow teacher María Teresa Obregón Zamora. The couple would have four children, Jorge Manuel, Omar, Gabriel and María Eugenia and raised them in the city of Heredia.

In 1920 he rejected an offer by President Julio Acosta to serve as Undersecretary of Education and later rejected an offer to be the Minister of Foreign Affairs. During the Coto War with Panama he enlisted as a soldier with the Costa Rican military and in 1923 supported the political campaign of Ricardo Jiménez. Later in 1926 and 1927 he engaged in disputes with the United Fruit Company.

== Legacy ==
The main campus of the National University of Costa Rica bears his name, as does a prize in Costa Rica. In 1969 he was declared a Distinguished Citizen of the Nation by the Legislative Assembly of Costa Rica. In 2008 a conference dedicated to his work was organised by the School of Educational Administration of the University of Costa Rica, led by his daughter Maria Eugenia Dengo Obregon.

== See also ==
- Anarchism in Costa Rica
- Trade unions in Costa Rica
