= Julio Fonseca (composer) =

Costa Rican composer and conductor

Julio Fonseca (1881–1950) was a Costa Rican composer and conductor.

== Early life and education ==
Julio Fonseca was born in San José, Costa Rica on May 22, 1881. His primary and secondary education was obtained at the Seminary School in San Jose. He studied for his bachelors at the Lyceum of Costa Rica.

He began to study music from an early age at the National School of Music, and later at the Accademia Nazionale di Santa Cecilia. He created his first compositions in 1897 - 1902 while under the tutelage of important musicians such as José Joaquín Vargas Calvo and Alvise Castegnaro.

These compositions include ¡Licha ... ! (1897), Noche de luna (1897), Brisas del campo (1898), En la matiné (1898), Esperanza (1898); also works for the solo piano: Celia (1898), Fuegos Fatuos (1901), Escenas del festín (1901), Miniatura (1901), Estudio (1901), Nocturno (1901), Paisaje (1902); Ave María (1898) and Oh Salutaris, composed in 1902.

== Time in Europe (1902–1906) ==
=== Milan, Italy ===
In 1902, he received a scholarship from the government of President Ascensión Esquivel Ibarra to study in Europe. He was accepted to both the Royal Bavarian Music School and the Milan Conservatory. After careful consideration, he decided to study in piano and harmony in Milan. He arrived to discover that he was one year short of the conservatory's age requirement and had to study for a year at an art school. The school terminated Fonseca's studies prompting him to write a letter to the Costa Rican government requesting permission to transfer to another conservatory while maintaining his government provided scholarship.

=== Brussels, Belgium ===
Fonseca's application was accepted at the Royal Conservatory of Brussels prompting a move to that city in 1904. His academic stay was extended into 1906, when he was diagnosed with a serious pulmonary disease that motivated him to return to Costa Rica. During his time Europe, he wrote the songs Amor ti chiedo (1904) and the work, Nocturnetto, written in Milan. In Brussels, he wrote The Sonata en Si for piano and piano; the trio for violin, cello and piano El Cenáculo, the quartet for strings and piano, el Gólgota, and Romanza, a song with French lyrics.

== Return to Costa Rica ==
From 1907 to 1913, he remained in Costa Rica teaching music direction and instruments. During this period, he met María Elena Mora whom he married in 1912. Together, they had three sons and two daughters: Jimmy (1916), Harold (1920), Mercy, Molly y Julio (1924). Among his most important compositions at this time were the waltzes: El Enigma (1912) and Florita (1912); and the promenades Claudia (1912) and Brisas del Caribe (1912); the funeral march Ecce homo (1911) and the march El centenario (1911).

== Time in the US (1914–1916) ==
In 1914, Fonseca travelled with his wife to New York to improve his musical knowledge and economic situation. Their stay in lasted only one year as the economic and labor situation was very difficult given the turmoil of World War I. The situation was challenging enough that they had to receive assistance from the musician, Alejandro Monestel and the writer, Manuel González Zeledón. During this year (1914), Fonseco wrote important works like the religious songs, Dios te Salve numbers 1 and 2; the tangos, El elegante, El gaucho, Midinettes, No aflojés, che; the funeral march, Inri; the orchestral works, Maxixe and Obertura húngara, and his famous waltz, Leda.

== Second return to Costa Rica (1916–1950) ==
=== Teaching ===
After his return to Costa Rica in 1916, Fonseca dedicated his efforts to teaching, participating in important academic projects such as the founding of the Conservatorio de Música y Declamación. He was also part of the faculty of the Escuela de Música Santa Cecilia, where he occasionally assumed the duties of the Director of the Institution (J. J. Vargas Calvo) during the director's absences. In 1934, Fonseca founded the la Academia Euterpe with his son Jimmy and violinist Raúl Cabezas. The academy was only in operation for a few years. It primarily focused on teaching violin and piano, but also had a choir and an orchestra.

Fonseca was an instructor at the Colegio de Señoritas where he was a professor of music from 1927 to 1942. Finally, Fonseca was a founding professor at the Conservatorio Nacional de Música, in 1942. This institution later transformed into the School of Music Arts of the University of Costa Rica.

=== Organist and choir director ===
Julio Fonseca Gutiérrez had a deep and profound bond between his artistic life and his religious beliefs. This is evident in his relationship with Catholic institutions, and his work as the Choir Director of the Iglesia de la Merced from 1932 until the last years of his life. Fonseca's youngest son, Julio Jr., dedicated himself to the priesthood inspiring Fonseca to compose the Mass, Vitis et Palmites, in December 1948 in honor of his son's ordination. Fonseca's unedit works contain many compositions exalting the pillars of the Christian religion with 35 songs and hymns dedicated to the Virgin Mary. His works inspired by Christianity also include important compositions like the choral cantatas Los Siete Dolores de la Virgen (1920) and el Auto Místico de la Virgen de los Ángeles (1938). He also wrote five masses: la Misa Teologal en Sol Mayor (1928), la misa Corazón de María (1929), Ave María Stella (1932), la misa Ujarrás (1934) and la misa Vitis et Palmites (1948).

=== Other work ===
In addition to his work as a teacher, composer and choir director, Fonseca was also known as the director of an orchestra and musical group that performed during dedications of social spaces and special events in Costa Rica during the first half of the 20th century. He was also recognized as an official instrumentalist of the Military Band of San Jose, a musical institution for whom he composed and released some of his work. He was also a music critic and journalist, writing for the newspaper La Justicia Social in the early part of the 20th century, and later for the magazine El Maestro and for la Revista Musical with three articles published in 1940, 1941, 1944. In 1910, he wrote a booklet titles Lecciones de Armonía (Lessons in Harmony) for the Santa Cecilia school of music.

=== In search of national identity – trips to Guanacaste ===
Julio Fonseca was part of a group of musicians that responded in 1927, to a call from Education Secretary Luis Dobles Segreda of governor Jiménez de Oreamuno's administration to search for a national identify in the field of music. In 1929, the government decided to send three musicians, Roberto Cantillano, José Daniel Zúñiga and Julio Fonseca, to Guanacaste where they would compile, harmonize, and edit a compilation of folklore, El Folleto de Música Folclórica Nacional. Three editions of the work were published in 1929, 1934, and 1935.

== Last years ==
The last years of Julio Fonseca were full of emotional contrasts. The death of his wife Maria Elena in 1948 caused health problems for him. His son Julio Jr was ordained and priest. He wrote more important works such as the mass, Vitis et Palmites and the waltz, María Elena. In the months before his death, he visited his sons, Jimmy and Harold. During this trip, a tribute concert was arranged by the Pan American Union that included an opportunity for him to conduct the orchestra. Julio Fonseca died in San José on June 22, 1950.

== Primary Sources ==
Manuscritos de obras de Julio Fonseca. Archivo Musical Universidad de Costa Rica. P1-0462, P1-466, P1-0467, P1-0470, P1-0472, P1-0473, P1-0475, P1-0561, P1-0565, P1-0574, P1-0579, P1-0588, P1-0625, P1-0631, P1-0640, P1- 0641
