= Edificio Correos =

Postal center in San José, Costa Rica

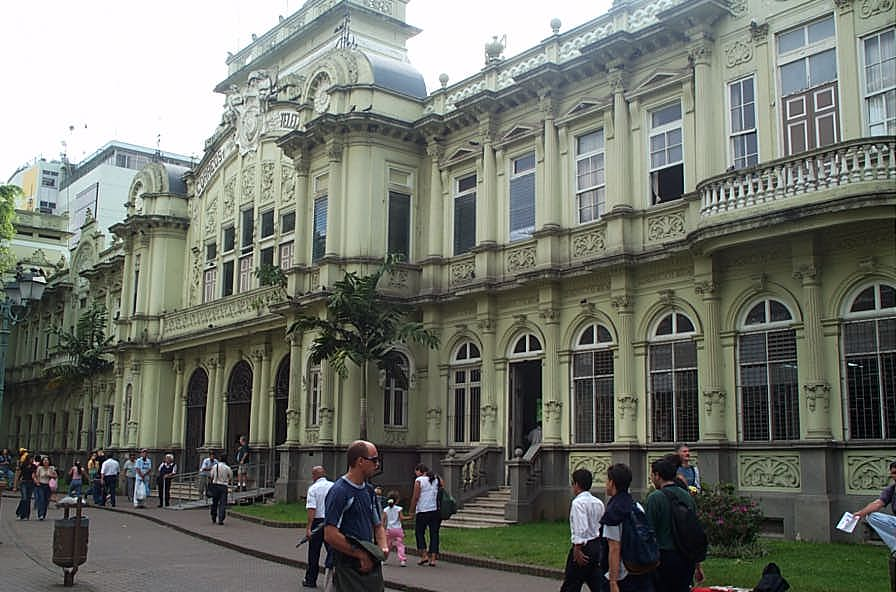
The Edificio Central de Correos y Telégrafos building

Edificio Correos (Spanish: "Postal Building or Mail Building") is a major landmark and postal center of the city of San José, Costa Rica.

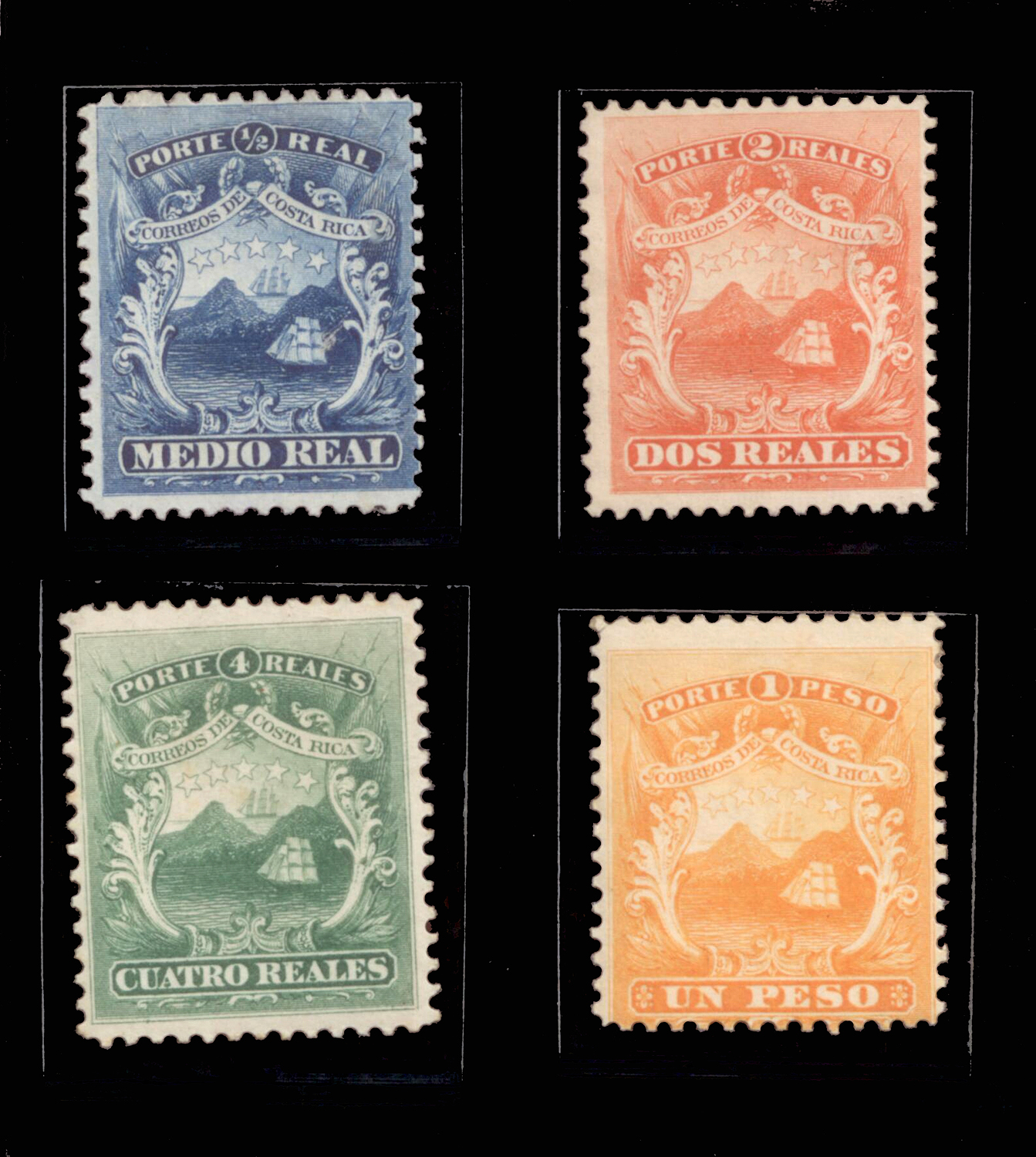
First four postal stamps issued in Costa Rica in 1863
