= List of Hispanics and Latinos in film =

EVA LONGORIA

Opportunities for Latino Americans (i.e. those people who are or have family ancestry from Latin America) in the film industry, often mirrors the opportunities, and challenges, facing people of other racial or ethnic identities who work in the industry, behind or in front of the film camera. Historically, actors or actresses of Latino ancestry often found work within certain stereotypical roles, which often reflected broader social attitudes and cultural biases.

Latino men were frequently depicted as being highly aggressive and also with low levels of emotional maturity, i.e. criminals, low-life thugs or the highly passionate, even violent, love interest of the starring character. Latino women, Latinas, were similarly portrayed when it came to their sexuality, but where as Latino men could be in a position of authority, albeit within an anti-social, criminal setting, Latinas were oftentimes characters with much less authority, such as housemaids, domestic servants or even prostitutes.

Traditionally, even without the usage of these stereotypes, it was rare for a Latino or Latina character in a film to be the star, unless the film was primarily marketed to a Latino audience. Behind the camera, it is still difficult for a Latino film producer, director, screenwriter or cinematographer to have mainstream commercial success.

However, as the social attitudes and biases change, there has been a gradual improvement in film depictions as well as in career opportunities for Latin Americans.

== History ==
The negative stereotyping of Latinos in film relates to the history of Latinos. Mexican Americans were seen by Anglos as uneducated and lacking integrity and thus unworthy of the rights to citizenship. Early films portrayed these negative stereotypes of Mexicans and Mexican Americans, but as time went on these stereotypes expanded to Central and South Americans. In the late 1890s, few Latinos were involved in filmmaking or appeared as actors in films. The Latinos that did appear in films or produced films were from privileged backgrounds. At this time, the late 1890s, filmmaking consisted of silent films. Myrtle Gonzalez and Beatriz Michelena were among the few Latinos to create silent films. In the 1910s and 1920s, a few film production companies rose to dominate the industry, forcing the depletion of Latinos working in film production. It was not until the 1970s that Latinos reemerged in the field of film production.

Silent western films were the first films to feature Latino characters. The Latino characters often played the role of the rebellious "greaser" opposing the white hero. The term "greaser" is used to describe Mexican bandits and other lazy, untrustworthy Mexican characters. Tony the Greaser and The Greaser's Revenge were two movies that capitalized on this storyline. These films helped to start the trend of establishing Latino characters as "others" in contrast to whites. The Mexican government in the 1920s complained and boycotted Hollywood films. These boycotts and complaints led film producers to disassociate negative Latino characters from identification with any particular country. This led to pan-Latino representations which were still negative, just not associated with one particular country.

The mid-1920s led to a few opportunities for Latino actors and actresses. The popularity of the Italian actor Rudolph Valentino, the original "Latin lover", created opportunities for Latino actors and actresses such as Ramón Novarro, Dolores del Río, Lupe Vélez, Carmen Miranda etc. These actors were cast as major roles as passionate Latin lover types and became international stars in silent films. The Latin lover image capitalized on notions that Latinos were innately passionate and sexual. The Latin lover image still exists today along with Latinos being viewed as villains and servants.

== Changing times ==
Just as the population of Latinos is rapidly rising in the United States in the 21st century, Latinos are also emerging (although not as quickly as the population) in media, including motion pictures, both in front of and behind the camera. Mainstream news media conglomerates are finally covering "Latinos in Film" news, and also offer ground-breaking coverage specifically aimed at spotlighting Latinos in film, such as The Huffington Post's Latino Entertainment page. News not only highlights Latino celebrities, but Latino filmmakers of both studio and independent movies. Additionally, a small handful of organizations have emerged in the 2000s that advocate for Latinos rights and opportunity in the field of entertainment in the United States, as well as raising awareness of these rising talents, including the National Association of Latino Independent Producers (NALIP), The Latino Film Fund (LFF) and Edward James Olmos' Latino International Film Institute.

One of the first movies that portrayed Latinos not as stereotypes, but as regular families with their strengths and weaknesses was Mi Familia. The film won the Latino magazine's best picture of the 1995. It starred Edward James Olmos, Jimmy Smits and Jennifer Lopez.

Jennifer Lopez appeared in the Latino magazine's list of Hollywood's most powerful along with producer Nely Galán, writer–producer Josefina López, and Cameron Diaz. She also starred in movies such as Jack alongside Robin Williams, Anaconda as a female lead, and Money Train with Wesley Snipes and Woody Harrelson.

Moctesuma Esparza is a famous Latino producer who is best known for Selena, which grossed $21.7 million in its first ten days. He started his career in the 1980s with movies like Gettysburg, The Battle of Gregorio Cortez and The Milagro Beanfield War.

Things seem to be changing for Latinos in Hollywood as many Latinos enter and excel in the television and film industry. With movies such as Mi Familia and Selena making a respectable showing at the box office, the future is looking bright for Latinos in film.

== Latino actors ==
Actors	Note
Desi Arnaz	Born in Santiago de Cuba, Cuba
Desi Arnaz Jr.	Son of Desi Arnaz and Lucille Ball
Kuno Becker	Is a Mexican actor of German descent
Demián Bichir	Is a Mexican actor of Lebanese descent
Rubén Blades	Born in Panama City, Panama
Diego Boneta	Is a Mexican actor and singer
Benjamin Bratt	Is of Peruvian and German descent
Leo Carrillo	Was of Mexican and Spanish descent
Pedro de Cordoba	Was of Cuban and French descent
Benicio del Toro	Is a Puerto Rican actor
Eugenio Derbez	Is a Mexican actor
Héctor Elizondo	Is of Puerto Rican descent
Erik Estrada	Is of Puerto Rican descent
José Ferrer	Born in San Juan, Puerto Rico
Miguel Ferrer	Son of José Ferrer and Rosemary Clooney
Andy García	Born in Havana, Cuba
Gael García Bernal	Born in Guadalajara, Mexico
Jorge Garcia	Is of Cuban and Chilean descent
Michael Garza	Is of Mexican descent
Alfonso Herrera	Is a Mexican actor
Oscar Isaac	Born in Guatemala City, Guatemala
Raúl Juliá	Was a Puerto Rican actor
Fernando Lamas	Was an Argentine actor
Lorenzo Lamas	Son of Fernando Lamas and Arlene Dahl
John Leguizamo	Born in Bogotá, Colombia
George Lopez	Is of Mexican descent
Mario Lopez	Is of Mexican descent
Diego Luna	Is a Mexican actor
Cheech Marin	Is of Mexican descent
Chris-Pin Martin	Was of Mexican descent
Ricardo Montalbán	Born in Mexico City, Mexico
Frankie Muniz	Is of Puerto Rican, Irish, and Italian descent
Ramon Novarro	Was a Mexican actor
Edward James Olmos	Is of Mexican descent
Pedro Pascal	Born in Santiago, Chile
Michael Peña	Is of Mexican descent
Tyler Posey	Son of John Posey, his mother was of Mexican descent
Freddie Prinze	Was of Puerto Rican and German descent
Freddie Prinze Jr.	Son of Freddie Prinze, his mother is of English and Irish descent
Anthony Quinn	Was a Mexican actor
Paul Rodriguez	Born in Culiacán, Sinaloa, Mexico
Gilbert Roland	Was a Mexican actor
Rodrigo Santoro	Is a Brazilian actor
Charles Stevens	Was of Mexican and English descent
Danny Trejo	Is of Mexican descent
Wilmer Valderrama	Is of Colombian and Venezuelan descent

== Latina actresses ==
Actresses	Note
Jessica Alba	Her father is of Mexican ancestry
María Conchita Alonso	Is a Cuban-Venezuelan actress and singer
Trini Alvarado	Is a Puerto Rican-American actress
Adria Arjona	Is a Guatemalan-Puerto Rican actress
Lucie Arnaz	Daughter of Desi Arnaz and Lucille Ball
Bérénice Bejo	Is a French-Argentine actress
Sônia Braga	Is a Brazilian actress
Sasha Calle	Colombian parents
Barbara Carrera	Is a Nicaraguan-American actress
Elpidia Carrillo	Is a Mexican actress
Lynda Carter	Her mother was of Spanish-Mexican descent
Rosario Dawson	Her mother is of Puerto Rican and Afro-Cuban descent
Ana de Armas	Is a Cuban actress
Cote de Pablo	Is a Chilean-American actress
Kate del Castillo	Is a Mexican actress
Dolores del Río	Was a Mexican actress
Cameron Diaz	Her father's family were Cuban (of Spanish descent)
America Ferrera	Her parents, were originally from Tegucigalpa, Honduras
Selena Gomez	Her father is of Mexican descent
Eiza González	Is a Mexican actress and singer
Salma Hayek	Is a Mexican actress of Lebanese and Spanish descent
Katy Jurado	Was a Mexican actress
Victoria Justice	Her mother is of Puerto Rican ancestry
Eva Longoria	Is a Mexican-American actress
Jennifer Lopez	Puerto Rican parents
Kamala Lopez	Her father was from Venezuela
Demi Lovato	Her father was of Mexican and Spanish descent
Mía Maestro	Is an Argentine actress
Eva Mendes	Is a Cuban-American actress
Carmen Miranda	Was a Portuguese-born Brazilian
Fernanda Montenegro	Is a Brazilian actress
Maria Montez	Was a Dominican actress
Rita Moreno	Is a Puerto Rican actress and singer
Lupe Ontiveros	Daughter of Mexican immigrants
Rosie Perez	Puerto Rican parents
Dania Ramirez	Is a Dominican-American actress
Sara Ramírez	Is a Mexican-American actress
Chita Rivera	Is a Puerto Rican actress and singer
Naya Rivera	Her father was of Puerto Rican ancestry
Génesis Rodríguez	Is an American actress
Gina Rodriguez	Is a Puerto Rican actress
Michelle Rodriguez	Her mother is a native of the Dominican Republic, her father is a native of Puerto Rico
Mercedes Ruehl	Her mother was of Cuban and Irish ancestry
Zoe Saldaña	Is of mixed Puerto Rican and Dominican heritage
Roselyn Sánchez	Is a Puerto Rican singer-songwriter, model, actress, producer and writer
Catalina Sandino Moreno	Is a Colombian actress
Madeleine Stowe	Her mother came from a prominent family in Costa Rica
Karla Souza	Is a Mexican actress.
Lupita Tovar	Was a Mexican actress.
Sofía Vergara	Is a Colombian actress
Lupe Vélez	Was a Mexican actress.
Raquel Welch	Her father is of Bolivian descent
Tahnee Welch	Daughter of Raquel Welch, her father is of European descent
