= Costa Rican Foreign Trade Promoter =

Costa Rican investment promotion agency

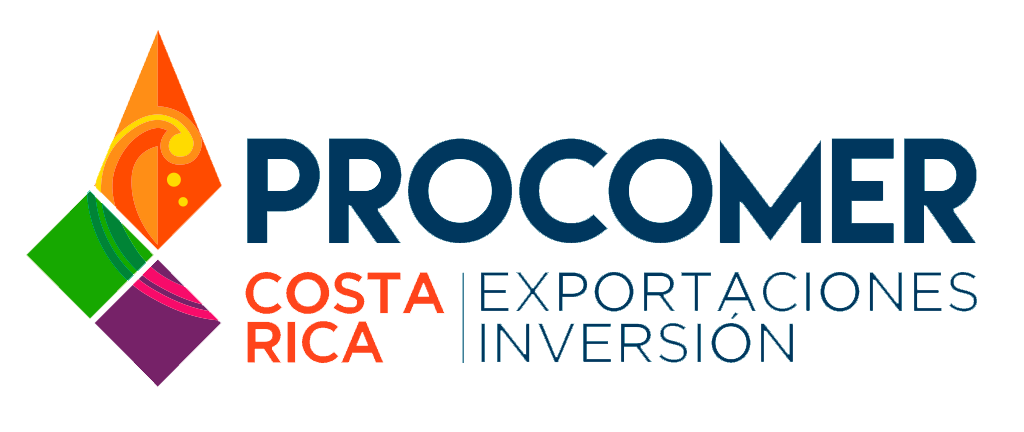

Investment promotion agency overview
- Formed: 30 October 1996
- Preceding Investment promotion agency: Center for Export and Investment Promotion
- Jurisdiction: Costa Rica
- Headquarters: 10203 Tempo Plaza Lobby B, Escazú
- Employees: 297
- Annual budget: ₡28 008 763 000 (2024)
- Minister responsible: Manuel Tovar Rivera, Ministry of Foreign Trade
- Investment promotion agency executives: Laura López Salazar, general manager; Mario Saénz, Export Development Manager; Marvin Rodríguez, Trade and Investment Facilitation Manager; Mónica Umaña, Investment Manager; Eddie Villalobos, Administration and Finance Manager; Mónica Umaña, Investment Manager
- Parent department: Ministry of Foreign Trade
- Website: www.procomer.com?lang=en

The Costa Rican Foreign Trade Promoter (PROCOMER) is a Costa Rican governmental agency for investment and export promotion responsible for export promotion programs, attracting foreign direct investment, creating human talent development programs, and providing technical and financial support for the administration of Costa Rica's special export regimes.

Established in 1996, was created to modernize export and investment promotion activities, replacing the Center for Export and Investment Promotion (CENPRO), which had been in operation since 1968. PROCOMER's mandate, as defined in its organic law, includes coordinating export and investment programs with guidance from the Executive and managing the country's free trade zone regime.

The institution's funding comes from various sources, including contributions from export and import sectors, as well as credits, donations, or legacies. While it enjoys budgetary flexibility due to its exclusion from annual spending limits, it remains subject to oversight by the Comptroller General of the Republic, except for budget approval.

The International Trade Centre (ITC), an agency affiliated with the World Trade Organization (WTO) and the United Nations (UN), has recognized the agency as the world's best investment promotion agency for four consecutive years, most recently in April 2018.

== Background ==
In the 1960s, only Ireland, Switzerland, South Korea, and Japan had investment and export promotion agencies. This number quadrupled in Latin America and the Caribbean (LAC) and the countries of the Organization for Economic Cooperation and Development (OECD). This growth led to the opening of international offices for these agencies. According to data from the World Bank, 20 new offices of this kind were established from 2014 to 2019. Additionally, according to this organization, the investment promotion agencies in Latin America and the Caribbean have an average budget of US$5 million, whereas their OECD counterparts have budgets of US$14 million. They also differ in their staffing size, with an average of 48 people in LAC and 135 in OECD countries.

=== Creation ===
Before the 2000s, the Ministry of Foreign Trade in Costa Rica operated without a formal legal framework, which posed a challenge in trade negotiations, as most countries already had a dedicated ministry, secretariat, or specialized department in place. There were three institutions tasked with managing different export incentive programs and promoting investments: the National Investment Council, the Center for the Promotion of Exports and Investments (CENPRO), and the Export Free Zone Corporation.

On December 29, 1995, during José María Figueres Olsen's government, 15 members of the National Liberation Party's parliamentary group presented a bill with the aim of creating the Ministry of Foreign Trade (COMEX) and the Costa Rican Foreign Trade Promoter (PROCOMER). They noted that in the previous years, foreign trade had been the main driver of Costa Rica's economy, but the legislation governing the institutional framework was outdated.

The initial bill formally established the Ministry of Foreign Trade and merged the Permanent Delegation of Costa Rica to the World Trade Organization with the trade representatives stationed in diplomatic delegations. Additionally, it gave rise to PROCOMER as the executing arm of the policies set forth by the ministry, bestowing upon it the status of a non-state public entity operating as a public limited company.

The proposal was referred to the Special State Reforms Commission, and it received unanimous approval on April 23, 1996. During the first reading, the bill garnered 38 votes in favor and 2 against, with the opposing votes coming from left-wing party deputies Gerardo Trejos Salas (Democratic Force) and Rodrigo Gutiérrez Schwanhauser (New Democratic Party). The second reading saw 36 votes in favor and 9 against.

The bill was sent to the Presidential House, where it received the signatures of both President José María Figueres Olsen and the Minister of Foreign Trade, José Rossi Umaña, becoming Law 7638 on October 30, 1996.

The Foreign Trade Promotion Agency of Costa Rica is governed by its Board of Directors, which includes the Minister of Foreign Trade, three representatives from the Executive Branch, and the presidents of four business chambers: the Chamber of Commerce, the Chamber of Exporters, the Chamber of Industries, and the Chamber of Agriculture. Additionally, there is one representative for small and medium-sized exporters.

=== Costa Rican economy ===
During the 1990s, Costa Rica transitioned from an economy based on agriculture and manufacturing to one focused on attracting foreign direct investment through the expansion of special economic zones, the signing of international trade treaties, and globalization.

By the end of 2023, Costa Rican exports had reached $18.244 billion, representing a 16% increase compared to 2022, while imports totaled $22.516 billion, a 5% rise. The special regime accounted for 63.96% of exports and 21.03% of imports, whereas the definitive regime represented 34.74% of exports and 78.31% of imports. The main Costa Rican export products in 2023 were medical instruments and devices at $2.316 billion (13%), other needles and catheters, cannulas, and similar instruments at $2.097 billion (11%), medical prosthetics at $1.625 billion (9%), fresh bananas at $1.179 billion (6%), and pineapples at $1.147 billion (6%).

According to PROCOMER data, Costa Rica boasts 2,490 exporting companies dealing in 4,426 products destined for 169 international markets.

From 2019 to 2023, foreign direct investment inflows reached $15.946 billion. In 2023 alone, 59 new projects and 100 reinvestments were recorded.

Key trading partners in 2023
Imports			Exports		
Country	Value	%	Country	Value	%
United States	US$12,257,687,898.5 (equivalent to $12,952,504,414 in 2025)	41.59%	United States	US$8,676,671,068.14 (equivalent to $9,168,500,719 in 2025)	45,13
China	US$3,683,647,220 (equivalent to $3,892,451,600 in 2025)	12,50%	Netherlands	US$1,561,537,430 (equivalent to $1,650,051,839 in 2025)	8,12%
Mexico	US$1,480,674,890 (equivalent to $1,564,605,675 in 2025)	5,02%	Guatemala	US$944,000,301.89 (equivalent to $997,510,149 in 2025)	4,91%
Brazil	US$673,138,000 (equivalent to $711,294,250 in 2025)	2,28%	Belgium	US$840,597,350 (equivalent to $888,245,889 in 2025)	4,37%
Guatemala	US$606,353,140 (equivalent to $640,723,747 in 2025)	2,06%	Nicaragua	US$735,931,800 (equivalent to $777,647,462 in 2025)	3,83
Others	US$10,774,132,710 (equivalent to $11,384,855,174 in 2025)	36,55%	Others	US$6,468,989,650 (equivalent to $6,835,678,775 in 2025)	33.64

== Current organization ==
PROCOMER is composed of a Board of Directors, an Internal Audit office, and a General Management team. There is also a Deputy Management in charge of the Country Competitiveness Directorate, along with six management departments: Export Development, Trade and Investment Facilitation, Innovation and Digital Transformation, Administration and Finance, Investment, and Communication, Marketing, and Public Relations.

Export Development Department

- Business Intelligence Coordination
- Business Strategy Directorate
- GDEX Projects Coordination

Trade and Investment Facilitation Department

- One-stop shop Directorate
- Single Investment Shop Directorate
- Special Regimes Directorate

Innovation and Digital Transformation Department

- Commercial Intelligence Directorate
- Information Technology Directorate
- Innovation and Projects Directorate

Administration and Finance Management

- Human Resources Directorate
- Finance Administration Directorate

Investment Department

- Agricultural Directorate
- Advanced Manufacturing Directorate
- Services Directorate
- Special Projects Directorate
- Establishment and Aftercare Directorate
- Tourism Infrastructure Directorate

The board of directors is composed of the Minister of Foreign Trade, three representatives from the Executive, and the presidents of five business chambers: the Chamber of Commerce, the Chamber of Exporters, the Chamber of Industries, the Chamber of Agriculture, and the Chamber of Small and Medium Exporters.

=== National and International Offices ===
Countries and territories where PROCOMER has offices (in blue) or executive representation (in green)

PROCOMER has 14 offices in Costa Rica: its central offices located in the capital, San José, and seven regional offices in the cantons of Perez Zeledón, San Carlos, Liberia, Limón, Puntarenas, Grecia, and one in Pococí, which also serves the canton of Sarapiquí. It also has six One-stop shop in San Jose, Limon, Paso Canoas, Peñas Blancas, and Juan Santamaría International Airport.

It has 26 international offices on four continents. In Asia, they are located in China, Japan, and South Korea; in Europe, they are found in Spain, the United Kingdom, Italy, the Netherlands, Germany, Russia, and the Nordic region; in the Middle East, they are in Israel, and in North America, they are located in Canada, Mexico, Los Angeles, Miami, New York City, and Houston in the United States. In Central America, there are offices in El Salvador, Guatemala, Honduras, Panama, and Nicaragua. In the Caribbean, they have a presence in the Dominican Republic and Trinidad and Tobago, while in South America, they are located in Peru, Chile, and Ecuador.

In addition to the international offices, PROCOMER has executive or managerial representation in 126 countries worldwide, including Colombia, Australia, Brazil, Uruguay, Cuba, Indonesia, India, Saudi Arabia, Egypt, Ukraine, Poland, Morocco, Mauritania, Sudan, and South Sudan.

== Functions ==
Article 8 of its organic law stipulates that PROCOMER has the objectives and functions of designing and coordinating programs related to exports and investments in accordance with the guidelines set by the Executive. Its responsibilities include providing technical and financial support to the Ministry of Foreign Trade to manage special export regimes, promoting the country's commercial interests abroad and defending them. PROCOMER also manages a one-stop foreign trade system to centralize and streamline import and export procedures. It tracks foreign trade statistics in coordination with relevant institutions, manages assets in trust, and enters into all contracts permitted by law to fulfill its objectives and functions. Furthermore, it supports small and medium-sized exporting businesses and those with export potential through programs aimed at providing information, training, and commercial promotion to facilitate their access to international markets.

In practice, PROCOMER promotes Costa Rican exports through marketing campaigns and participation in trade shows. It works on simplifying and expediting import and export processes, reducing bureaucratic barriers, and promoting efficiency in foreign trade. The agency also conducts market research to help Costa Rican companies identify international business opportunities and provides training and guidance to help them develop export strategies. Additionally, PROCOMER is responsible for promoting foreign direct investment in Costa Rica, attracting companies and projects that contribute to the country's economic development.

Training

- Cost Structure for the ICT Sector
- Export Pricing in the Goods Sector
- Developing Valuable Content on Social Media to Attract International Clients
- Key Aspects of Copyright, Creation, and Protection of Creative Content
- Main Aspects of HACCP Certification (Hazard Analysis and Critical Control Points)
- Pre-sales and Post-sales in Export for the Goods Sector
- Purchase and Sale Contracts and Means in Export for the Goods Sector

Sales Pitch for Export

- Patents: Protecting Your Ideas and Technologies
- The Decision to Export for the Goods Sector
- Key Aspects of Digital Marketing
- Introduction to Good Manufacturing Practices (GMP) for the Food Industry Aimed at Export
- Aligning My Business Model for Export
- The Decision to Export for the Services Sector

Programs

- Human Talent Strategy
- Ramp Up
- Green Growth
- K-Global
- Cultiva +
- Descubre

Tools

- Buy from Costa Rica
- CR Business Book
- Market Studies
- Export Guide
- Entrepreneurial Woman's Manual
- Royalty Payment
- Statistical Portal
- Reimbursable Rights Regime
- Registration of National Companies Subcontracted by Companies Under Free * Trade Zone and/or Active Improvement Regimes
- Sales Report
- Online Special Regimes Procedures System
- Integrated Logistics System
- Exporter Test
- Foreign Trade One-stop (VUCE)
- Investment One-stop (VUI)

=== 2023-2026 FDI attraction plan ===
On June 15, 2023, COMEX and PROCOMER presented the plan for attracting foreign direct investment to Costa Rica with goals to generate 100 000 jobs and attract 70 investment projects in regions outside the Greater Metropolitan Area (GAM); achieve an investment of US$12,950 million over four years, 300 reinvestment projects, 200 new projects, 24 projects under the public-private partnership alliance DESCUBRE, 8,000 jobs outside the GAM, 70 projects from new geographies, and 12,000 people employed through human talent programs.

The plan is based on three pillars: attracting new FDI in established, emerging, and new sectors; providing support and advice in procedures, supplier management, new incentives, reinvestments, and the removal of obstacles to investment; and special programs outside the GAM, human talent and clusters.

== General managers ==
Name	Period
Laura López Salazar	2023–current
Pedro Beirute Prada	2014–2023
Jorge Sequeira Picado	2010–2014
Emanuel Hess	2008–2010
Martín Zúñiga	2004–2008
Manfred Kissling	2002–2004
Leda Jiménez	2000–2002
James Stanley	1999–2000
Eduardo Alonso	1996–1999

== See also ==
- World Association of Investment Promotion Agencies
- China Investment Promotion Agency
- Board of Investment (Pakistan)
- Board of Investment of Sri Lanka
- IDA Ireland
- Invest Europe
- Invest KOREA
- Invest Northern Ireland
- InvestUkraine
- Jordan Investment Commission
- Nigerian Investment Promotion Commission

== Bibliography ==
- Legislative Assembly of Costa Rica (1996). Expediente #12482 – Ley #7638 [Bill #12482 – Law #7638] (PDF) (in Spanish). Costa Rica: Library of the Legislative Assembly of Costa Rica. Archived from the original (PDF) on 2023-10-20.
- Gómez, Arlina; Zolezzi, Sandro (2018-09-18). "Gobernanza de la formulación e implementación de políticas públicas para las exportaciones de servicios modernos en Costa Rica" [Governance of the formulation and implementation of public policies for exports of modern services in Costa Rica] (PDF). UNCTAD Global Services Forum and REDLAS Conference 2018: Knowledge-based Services for Sustainable Development (in Spanish). Archived (PDF) from the original on 2021-05-02.
