= Quintana =

Quintana may refer to:

== Places ==
- Quintana (castra), a street in a Roman camp

=== Geographic features ===
- Quintana Island, an Antarctic island

=== Settlements, and administrative and political divisions ===
- Quintana Municipality in São Paulo, Brazil
- Quintana, Texas, United States
- Quintana (Hato Rey), a sector in Puerto Rico
- Quintana (Belmonte), a parish in Asturias, Spain
- Quintana, Álava, a concejo in the Basque Country in Spain
- Quintana (Madrid), a ward in Madrid, Spain
- Quintana de la Serena, municipality in Spain
- Quintana Roo, a state in Mexico
- Quintana y Congosto, a municipality in Spain
- Villarta-Quintana, a municipality in Spain

=== Structures and sites ===
- Estadio Quintana Roo, a football stadium in Quintana Roo
- La Quintana, a library park in Medellin, Colombia
- Quintana (Madrid Metro), a station on Line 5
- Quintana Square, the main square of Santiago de Compostela, Galicia, Spain

== People ==
Quintana is a Spanish surname, associated with:

- Aleida Quintana (born 1987), Mexican human rights activist
- Alfredo Quintana (1988–2021), Portuguese handballer
- Andrés Quintana Roo (1787–1851), Mexican politician
- Anton Quintana (1937–2017), Dutch writer
- Anxo Quintana (born 1959), Spanish politician
- Quintana Olleros (1851–1919, born Blas Olleros y Quintana), Spanish painter
- Charlie Quintana (1962–2018), US musician
- Carlos Quintana (disambiguation)
  - Carlos Quintana (boxer) (born 1976), Puerto Rican boxer
  - Carlos Morales Quintana (born 1970), Spanish architect and yachtsman, husband of Princess Alexia of Greece and Denmark
  - Carlos Quintana (baseball) (born 1965), Major League Baseball player
  - Carlos Quintana (footballer) (born 1988), Argentine football defender
- Dani Quintana (born 1987), Spanish footballer
- Dayer Quintana (born 1992), Colombian professional road bicyclist
- Diego Quintana (born 1978), Argentine footballer
- Dionisio Quintana (1957–2026), Cuban javelin thrower and trainer
- Enrique Quintana
- Enrique Fuentes Quintana (1924–2007), Spanish politician
- Gretchen Quintana (born 1984), Cuban heptathlete
- Ismael Quintana (1937–2016), Puerto Rican singer
- Janelle Quintana (born 1989), Filipina actress
- José Quintana (born 1989), Major League Baseball player
- Changuito (born 1948; as José Luís Quintana), Cuban percussionist
- José Luis Naranjo y Quintana (born 1944), Mexican politician
- Juan de Quintana (died 1534), Franciscan friar and confessor to the Holy Roman Emperor
- Juan Cortada y Quintana (1821–1889), Puerto Rican politician
- Leona Vicario (1789–1842; as Leona Vicario de Quintana Roo), Mexican independentist rebel
- Lope Conchillos y Quintana (died 1521), Spanish politician
- Manuel Quintana (1835–1906), President of Argentina from 1904 to 1906
- Manuel José Quintana (1772–1857), Spanish writer
- Mário Quintana (1906–1994), Brazilian writer
- Nairo Quintana (born 1990), Colombian racing cyclist
- Rosa Quintana (born 1959), Spanish civil servant and politician
- Sebastián Quintana (born 1983), Uruguayan/Qatari footballer
- Francisco J. Quintana (born 1974), American-Argentinean neuroscientist

=== Characters ===
- Jesus Quintana, a character in the films The Big Lebowski and The Jesus Rolls, portrayed by John Turturro
- Dante Quintana, the main character from the book Aristotle and Dante Discover the Secrets of the Universe, by Benjamin Alire Sáenz

== Sports ==
- Quintana Roo Tigres, a Mexican baseball team
- Academia Quintana, a Puerto Rican football team
- Quintana Roo (company), a company that produces time trial bicycles mainly for triathlons

== Biology ==
- Quintana atrizona, a Cuban fish species in the monotypic genus Quintana
- Bartonella quintana, or Rochalimaea quintana, a bacterium that causes trench fever

== Other uses ==
- Quintana Roo Speleological Survey of Quintana Roo, Mexico
- Operation Quintana Roo, Mexican anti-narcotics military operation
- Giostra della Quintana, a historical jousting tournament in Foligno, Italy
- "Quintana", a song by Travis Scott from his mixtape Owl Pharaoh
