= Vojvodina Investment Promotion =

Investment promotion agency in Serbia

Vojvodina Investment Promotion - VIP
- Established: 2004
- Chair: Branislav Bugarski
- Staff: 15
- Address: Narodnog fronta 23d
- Location: Novi Sad, Serbia

Vojvodina Investment Promotion (VIP) is a regional investment promotion agency founded by the Parliament of the Autonomous Province of Vojvodina which provides advisory and assistance services to foreign companies wishing to locate their businesses within the region of Vojvodina.

== History ==
Vojvodina Investment Promotion - VIP was founded by the Parliament of the Autonomous Province of Vojvodina in 2004. as a part of the strategic document named "Economic development program of AP Vojvodina".

== Activity ==
VIP aims to enable economic development through facilitation of FDI and provision of professional services to foreign companies that wish to invest in Vojvodina. VIP favors investments in agribusiness, ICT, shared business services, tourism, automotive industry, metal processing, real estate and renewable energy. VIP acts as a coordinator between foreign investors and local authorities and networks. VIP also provides business opportunities in Vojvodina through location marketing, design of tailor made solutions for foreign investors, aftercare, policy advocacy and development of business incubators.

Vojvodina Investment Promotion is a member of World Association of Investment Promotion Agencies (WAIPA)

== See also ==
- Investment promotion agency
