= Invest Atlanta =

Official economic development authority of the City of Atlanta, Georgia

- The Atlanta Development Authority d/b/a Invest Atlanta

Agency overview
- Formed: February 17, 1997
- Preceding agencies: Atlanta Economic Development Corporation (1976); Urban Residential Finance Authority (1979); Downtown Development Authority (1982)
- Jurisdiction: City of Atlanta, Georgia
- Headquarters: 133 Peachtree Street NE, Suite 2900 Atlanta, Georgia 30303
- Minister responsible: Andre Dickens, Mayor of Atlanta (Board Chair)
- Agency executive: Dr. Eloisa Klementich, CEcD, President and Chief Executive Officer
- Parent agency: City of Atlanta
- Website: www.investatlanta.com

Footnotes
- Legal name: The Atlanta Development Authority

Invest Atlanta (formally The Atlanta Development Authority, or ADA) is the official economic development authority for the City of Atlanta, Georgia. Established in its current form by resolution of the Atlanta City Council on February 17, 1997, the agency operates under the trade name "Invest Atlanta," a brand identity adopted in 2011–2012. Its statutory mandate, drawn from the Georgia Redevelopment Powers Law (O.C.G.A. § 36-44-1 et seq.) and the Development Authorities Law of Georgia (O.C.G.A. § 36-62-1 et seq.), is to stimulate economic development, attract corporate investment, finance affordable housing, and administer tax increment financing districts within Atlanta's city limits.

The agency is governed by a nine-member board of directors chaired by the Mayor of Atlanta, currently Andre Dickens. Day-to-day operations are led by President and CEO Dr. Eloisa Klementich, who has held the position since 2016. The agency's principal office is located at 133 Peachtree Street NE, Suite 2900, in Downtown Atlanta.

As of 2025, Invest Atlanta administers ten Tax Allocation Districts (TADs) encompassing significant portions of Atlanta's urban core, including the BeltLine TAD—the primary local funding mechanism for the Atlanta BeltLine project. The agency has issued more than $848 million in TAD bonds since the program's inception, and its subsidiary, Atlanta Emerging Markets, Inc. (AEMI), has received more than $258 million in federal New Markets Tax Credit allocations from the U.S. Department of the Treasury since 2007.

== History ==
=== Origins: Atlanta Economic Development Corporation (1976–1996) ===
The institutional precursors to Invest Atlanta date to the mayoral administration of Maynard Jackson. In 1976, the City of Atlanta created the Atlanta Economic Development Corporation (AEDC), naming Timothy Alexander as its first president, to serve as a vehicle for industrial recruitment and site development. The Urban Residential Finance Authority (URFA) was created in 1979 to provide below-market-rate mortgage financing for single-family and multifamily housing, and was formally staffed and operationalized in 1985.

In 1982, during the administration of Mayor Andrew Young, the city created a separate Downtown Development Authority (DDA) to spur commercial reinvestment in the central business district. The DDA subsequently issued bonds to finance the 1989 revitalization of Underground Atlanta.

In 1985, Georgia voters approved the Redevelopment Powers Law, which authorized local governments to use tax increment financing as a redevelopment tool—a legal foundation that would later underpin Atlanta's Tax Allocation District program.

In 1992, during Mayor Maynard Jackson's third term, the city created Georgia's first tax allocation district, the Techwood Park TAD, to spur redevelopment of downtown land in preparation for the 1996 Summer Olympics. That site later became Centennial Olympic Park.

=== Formation of the Atlanta Development Authority (1997–2011) ===
On February 17, 1997, the Atlanta City Council passed a resolution activating the Atlanta Development Authority (ADA) under O.C.G.A. § 36-62-1, consolidating the city's scattered development functions. Kevin Hanna was named the ADA's first president.

In 1998, the ADA, the City of Atlanta, Fulton County, and Atlanta Public Schools collectively established the Westside Tax Allocation District (replacing the earlier Techwood Park TAD) as the city's primary redevelopment instrument for neighborhoods surrounding Centennial Olympic Park, Vine City, and English Avenue. The Atlantic Station TAD followed in 1999 to facilitate redevelopment of the former Atlantic Steel plant site in Midtown. In 2001, the ADA issued the first TAD bonds in Atlanta's history: $15 million in Westside TAD bonds for six downtown projects, followed by $76.5 million in Atlantic Station TAD bonds.

During the administration of Mayor Shirley Franklin (2002–2009), the ADA expanded its TAD program. The Eastside TAD was created in 2003, and in 2005 the BeltLine TAD, Perry/Bolton TAD, and Princeton Lakes TAD were established. Four additional corridor TADs were created in 2006: the Stadium Neighborhoods, Campbellton Road, Hollowell/MLK, and Metropolitan Parkway TADs. Major bond issuances accompanied each district's creation.

In 2006, the ADA and Central Atlanta Progress formed Imagine Downtown, Inc., which won its first New Markets Tax Credit allocation of $60 million from the federal government in 2007. In 2011, the organization was renamed Atlanta Emerging Markets, Inc. to reflect a broader, citywide mandate.

=== Rebranding as Invest Atlanta (2011–present) ===
In 2011, the ADA created the "Invest Atlanta" brand name and logo, with the formal transition taking effect in 2012. Brian McGowan was named President and CEO in 2011, followed by Craig Richard in 2014, and Dr. Eloisa Klementich in 2016.

Several corporate headquarters relocations occurred during this period. In 2013, PulteGroup relocated its corporate headquarters from Michigan to Atlanta. In 2015, NCR Corporation moved its global headquarters to a new Midtown campus, and Invest Atlanta issued $200 million in bonds to help finance construction of Mercedes-Benz Stadium, the $1.4 billion home of the Atlanta Falcons and Atlanta United FC. In 2018, Invest Atlanta led the effort to recruit Norfolk Southern Corporation from Virginia to a new Midtown campus.

In 2015, Invest Atlanta received accreditation as an Accredited Economic Development Organization from the International Economic Development Council (IEDC).

== Legal structure and authority ==
Invest Atlanta's legal identity is that of the Atlanta Development Authority (ADA), a public body corporate and politic created under the Development Authorities Law of Georgia (O.C.G.A. § 36-62-1 et seq.). It operates under two overarching grants of governmental authority: the Local Government Authorities Registration Act and the Georgia Redevelopment Powers Law (O.C.G.A. § 36-44-1 et seq.).

Structurally, Invest Atlanta is an umbrella entity comprising several legally distinct authorities whose boards meet concurrently:

- The Atlanta Development Authority (ADA) – the primary governing entity for TAD administration, corporate recruitment, and general economic development.
- Urban Residential Finance Authority (URFA) – Invest Atlanta's housing finance arm, empowered to issue tax-exempt bonds for single-family and multifamily affordable housing.
- Downtown Development Authority (DDA) – retains independent bonding authority for projects within the downtown core.
- Atlanta Urban Redevelopment Agency (AURA) – created in 2010 to support neighborhood-level redevelopment activities.
- Atlanta Emerging Markets, Inc. (AEMI) – a wholly-owned Community Development Entity (CDE) that administers the federal New Markets Tax Credit program on behalf of the city.

== Operations and financing tools ==
=== Tax Allocation Districts ===
The Tax Allocation District (TAD) program is Invest Atlanta's primary redevelopment financing tool. A TAD is a geographically defined area in which any increase in property tax revenue above a frozen baseline—called the "tax increment"—is captured and redirected to fund infrastructure and development within that district, rather than flowing to the general funds of the City, Fulton County, and Atlanta Public Schools. The concept is equivalent to what most other states refer to as tax increment financing (TIF).

TAD bonds are debt instruments issued against projected future incremental tax revenues, used to provide gap financing to development projects. All bond issuance and TAD fund administration is managed by Invest Atlanta in its role as the City's legally designated redevelopment agent.

The establishment of a TAD requires approval from each taxing jurisdiction with authority over the affected area. Under Georgia law, TADs cannot be created if more than 10 percent of the city's total tax base is already within TAD boundaries; as of 2025, approximately 17 percent of Atlanta's tax base fell within its TADs, exceeding the statutory cap for new district creation.

Atlanta's ten TADs, administered by Invest Atlanta as of 2026, are the Westside TAD (est. 1998), Atlantic Station TAD (est. 1999), Eastside TAD (est. 2003), BeltLine TAD (est. 2005), Perry/Bolton TAD (est. 2005), Princeton Lakes TAD (est. 2005), and the four corridor TADs created in 2006: Stadium Neighborhoods, Campbellton Road, Hollowell/MLK, and Metropolitan Parkway.

In 2008, a lawsuit challenged the BeltLine TAD for diverting school tax funds in alleged violation of the Georgia Constitution. The Georgia General Assembly responded by placing a constitutional amendment on the statewide ballot; voters approved the amendment, allowing future TADs to collect school tax increments upon school board approval.

By 2025, Invest Atlanta had issued $848 million in TAD bonds across all districts, with approximately 90 percent of all increment revenue concentrated in the BeltLine, Westside, and Eastside TADs.

In 2025, Mayor Andre Dickens proposed extending all of the city's existing TADs through 2055 as part of his Neighborhood Reinvestment Initiative, a redevelopment framework targeting racial and economic inequality; the proposal required consent from the City Council, Atlanta Public Schools Board, and Fulton County.

=== Tax-exempt bond financing ===
Through URFA, its housing finance subsidiary, Invest Atlanta issues tax-exempt bonds under Internal Revenue Code Section 142 to provide below-market interest rate permanent financing to developers of affordable multifamily rental housing. URFA receives annual tax-exempt bond allocation from the Georgia Department of Community Affairs and serves as a conduit bond issuer. Eligible projects must be located within the city limits and must set aside a minimum percentage of units for renters at or below applicable income thresholds.

Through the DDA and ADA, the agency also issues lease-purchase bonds to finance major commercial and corporate development. The agency used this instrument for the Norfolk Southern headquarters project, providing up to $600 million in lease-purchase bonds—structured as construction financing to be repaid over time, distinct from a direct tax subsidy.

=== New Markets Tax Credits ===
The New Markets Tax Credit (NMTC) program was created by the U.S. Congress in 2000 to attract private investment to low-income communities. In 2006, Invest Atlanta created Atlanta Emerging Markets, Inc. (AEMI) as a wholly-owned Community Development Entity (CDE) to apply for and deploy NMTC allocations on behalf of the city. Under the program, AEMI raises private equity from investors who receive non-refundable federal tax credits in exchange, and deploys those proceeds as low-interest loans or equity investments in qualifying projects in low-income census tracts.

As of early 2026, AEMI had received $258 million in cumulative NMTC allocation from the U.S. Department of the Treasury since 2007 and had deployed more than $210 million across eighteen projects in Atlanta. Past NMTC-financed projects have included the National Center for Civil and Human Rights, a $12 million investment in Grady Memorial Hospital's emergency department expansion, the historic Flatiron Building renovation, and Families First's Westside headquarters.

In December 2025, AEMI received a $75 million NMTC allocation—its largest single award—from the U.S. Department of the Treasury's CDFI Fund, making it one of only four entities in Georgia to receive an allocation in that cycle.

== Major programs and projects ==
=== Atlanta BeltLine ===
The Atlanta BeltLine is a 22-mile loop of multi-use trails, parks, and planned transit infrastructure built along a former rail corridor encircling Atlanta's urban core. Invest Atlanta has a central financial role in the project as the administrator of the BeltLine Tax Allocation District (BeltLine TAD), created by the Atlanta City Council in 2005.

The BeltLine TAD partners—the City of Atlanta, Fulton County, and Atlanta Public Schools—agreed to redirect future property tax increment above the 2005 baseline within the TAD's approximately 6,500 acres to pay for BeltLine infrastructure costs through the end of 2030. The TAD represents approximately 49 percent of the project's projected $4.4 billion total budget, with the remainder expected from federal, state, local, and philanthropic sources. The 2007–2009 financial crisis caused significant downward revisions to revenue projections, forcing amendments to PILOT (Payment in Lieu of Taxes) agreements with Atlanta Public Schools in 2009 and 2016.

Invest Atlanta formed Atlanta BeltLine, Inc. (ABI) as a separate nonprofit organization to manage day-to-day program operations and jointly oversees the TAD Advisory Committee (TADAC), which monitors spending and implementation. The BeltLine TAD collected more than $84 million in annual tax increment revenue in 2023—more than 2.5 times that of the next-largest TAD.

=== Affordable housing ===
==== Urban Residential Finance Authority (URFA) ====
URFA, a subsidiary board of Invest Atlanta, issues tax-exempt bonds annually under IRC Section 142 to provide below-market-rate permanent financing for multifamily rental housing. URFA also provides financing for single-family homeownership assistance, nonprofit housing development, and owner-occupied rehabilitation.

==== Housing Opportunity Bond Fund ====
The Housing Opportunity Bond Fund (HOB) was created to provide citywide gap financing for affordable and workforce housing projects. The program originated in 2017, when the Atlanta City Council unanimously approved the issuance of $40 million in Housing Opportunity Bonds. In March 2023, the City Council authorized a new $100 million Housing Opportunity Program bond, backed by the City of Atlanta and issued by Invest Atlanta, to finance affordable housing production and preservation citywide. Of that amount, $38 million was allocated to the newly created Atlanta Urban Development Corporation (AUD) to launch a revolving Housing Production Fund for development on publicly owned land. As of mid-2026, the $100 million fund had been fully allocated across housing projects in the pipeline.

==== BeltLine Affordable Housing Trust Fund ====
Invest Atlanta administers the BeltLine Affordable Housing Trust Fund (BAHTF), a program tied to the BeltLine TAD that promotes the creation and preservation of affordable housing within BeltLine corridor neighborhoods.

=== Corporate recruitment ===
Invest Atlanta functions as the city's primary agency for the recruitment and retention of major corporate employers, working in partnership with the Georgia Department of Economic Development, the Metro Atlanta Chamber of Commerce, and Georgia Power.

==== NCR Corporation ====
In 2015, NCR Corporation—then headquartered in Duluth, Georgia—relocated its global headquarters to a new campus in Midtown Atlanta. NCR received an incentive package potentially totaling more than $60 million, comprising property tax abatements, state tax credits for newly created jobs, and direct grants. In 2016, NCR announced a further expansion of its Midtown campus, committing to 1,800 additional jobs and $145 million in additional investment.

==== Norfolk Southern Corporation ====
Norfolk Southern Corporation announced in December 2018 that it would relocate its corporate headquarters from Norfolk, Virginia, to a new campus in Midtown Atlanta. Invest Atlanta approved $23.6 million in property tax abatements under a graduated assessment schedule beginning at 50 percent of assessed value in the first year and stepping down to full taxation over eleven years. The agency also provided up to $600 million in lease-purchase bond financing—structured as construction financing for the building rather than a direct subsidy—and administered a $7 million state grant.

The relocation was expected to create 850 new positions and retain approximately 2,025 existing corporate jobs, with an average salary of $105,331 and an estimated regional economic impact of $811 million. Ground was broken on the Cousins Properties-developed campus in March 2019, and Norfolk Southern began occupying the completed building in 2021.

=== Small business and entrepreneurship ===
==== Economic Opportunity Fund ====
Created in 2006 with an initial $5 million city allocation, the Economic Opportunity Fund provides gap financing and direct grants to small and medium-sized businesses creating new jobs within Atlanta's city limits.

==== Small Business Loan Programs ====
Invest Atlanta administers a portfolio of direct small business loan programs, including the Atlanta Recovery Loan Program (ARLP), which provides low-interest loans of up to $100,000 for small businesses seeking to acquire commercial real estate in low-income census tracts or Federal Opportunity Zones; and the Atlanta Startup Growth Loan Program, which provides loans of $50,000 to $150,000 to help startups acquire or upgrade assets, with a six-month payment deferral period.

==== Women's Entrepreneurship Initiative ====
The Women's Entrepreneurship Initiative (WEI) is a city-funded accelerator program for early-stage women entrepreneurs, launched in 2015 with support from the City of Atlanta and Invest Atlanta. WEI provides participating business owners with incubator workspace, mentorship, financial education, and access to capital over a program cycle of nine to fifteen months. The program is housed in the Flatiron Building in Downtown Atlanta. In 2019, WEI was formally integrated into Invest Atlanta's organizational structure. As of October 2025, WEI had supported more than 90 businesses and launched its seventh cohort of 15 founders.

== Governance ==
=== Board of Directors ===
Under O.C.G.A. § 36-62-4, the Atlanta Development Authority is governed by a nine-member board of directors. The Mayor of Atlanta serves as ex officio chair; Mayor Andre Dickens has served in that capacity since January 2022. One member serves by virtue of their seat on the Fulton County Board of Commissioners; one member represents the Atlanta Board of Education by position. The City Council appoints one additional member from a person nominated by the Atlanta Board of Education. The remaining members are taxpayers residing within the City of Atlanta, appointed by the Mayor to four-year terms representing designated sectors of the economy. Board members serve without compensation.

The full board meets on the third Thursday of each month at 9:00 a.m. The subsidiary boards of URFA, DDA, and AURA meet concurrently as necessary.

=== Leadership ===
The President and CEO is Dr. Eloisa Klementich, who has held the position since 2016. She holds a Certified Economic Developer (CEcD) designation from the International Economic Development Council.

=== Past presidents and CEOs ===
| Name | Period | Agency |
|---|---|---|
| Timothy Alexander | 1976–1979 | AEDC |
| Joe Martin | 1979–1985 | AEDC |
| Tarby Bryant | 1985–1988 | AEDC |
| Walter R. Huntley Jr. | 1988–1997 | AEDC |
| Kevin Hanna | 1997–2002 | ADA |
| Ernestine Garey (Interim) | 2002–2003; 2010 | ADA |
| Greg Giornelli | 2003–2006 | ADA |
| Peggy McCormick | 2006–2011 | ADA |
| Brian McGowan | 2011–2014 | Invest Atlanta |
| Craig Richard | 2014–2016 | Invest Atlanta |
| Dr. Eloisa Klementich | 2016–present | Invest Atlanta |

== See also ==
- Atlanta BeltLine
- Tax increment financing
- New Markets Tax Credit
- City of Atlanta
- Andre Dickens
- Kasim Reed
- Keisha Lance Bottoms
- Centennial Olympic Park
- Atlantic Station, Atlanta
- Ponce City Market
