= United Nations Economic Commission for Latin America and the Caribbean =

Specialized body of the United Nations

- Abbreviation: ECLAC
- Formation: 1948; 78 years ago
- Type: Primary Organ – Regional Branch
- Legal status: Active
- Headquarters: Santiago, Chile
- Head: José Manuel Salazar-Xirinachs
- Parent organization: United Nations Economic and Social Council
- Website: www.cepal.org/en

The United Nations Economic Commission for Latin America and the Caribbean (UNECLAC or ECLAC; Spanish: Comisión Económica para América Latina y el Caribe, CEPAL) is a United Nations regional commission to encourage economic cooperation. ECLAC includes 46 member states (20 in Latin America, 13 in the Caribbean and 13 from outside the region), and 14 associate members which are various non-independent territories, associated island countries and a commonwealth in the Caribbean. ECLAC publishes statistics covering the countries of the region and makes cooperative agreements with non-profit institutions. The headquarters of ECLAC is in Santiago, Chile.

ECLAC was established in 1948 as the Economic Commission for Latin America (ECLA). In 1984, a resolution was passed to include the countries of the Caribbean in the name. It reports to the UN Economic and Social Council (ECOSOC).

== Executive secretaries ==
Name	Country	Served
José Manuel Salazar-Xirinachs	Costa Rica	September 2022 –
Alicia Bárcena Ibarra	Mexico	July 2008 – March 2022
José Luis Machinea	Argentina	December 2003 – June 2008
José Antonio Ocampo	Colombia	January 1998 – August 2003
Gert Rosenthal	Guatemala	January 1988 – December 1997
Norberto González	Argentina	March 1985 – December 1987
Enrique V. Iglesias	Uruguay	April 1972 – February 1985
Carlos Quintana	Mexico	January 1967 – March 1972
José Antonio Mayobre	Venezuela	August 1963 – December 1966
Raúl Prebisch	Argentina	May 1950 – July 1963
Gustavo Martínez Cabañas	Mexico	December 1948 – April 1950

== Themes and programmes ==
=== Implementing Sustainable Development Goals ===
A mapping of ECLAC's activities to the Sustainable Development Goals (in 2023) shows that its current work emphasizes four SDGs; namely, SDG 17 on partnerships, SDG 8 on decent work, SDG 10 on reduced inequalities, and SDG 16 on peace and justice. In practice, ECLAC strives toward its own regional paradigm, called Global Environmental Keynesianism, which promotes multidimensional equality as the purpose of development. The commission seeks to balance the new SDGs with its earlier focus on equality and to better emphasize the environmental dimension of economic development.

ECLAC has been working on a debt-swap strategy since 2016, titled the Debt for Climate Adaptation Swap and Caribbean Resilience Fund. This fund aims to reduce the debt and fiscal constraints for investment in green industries, stimulate growth, promote economic transformation, and expand fiscal space for public investment such as for the SDGs.

== Locations ==
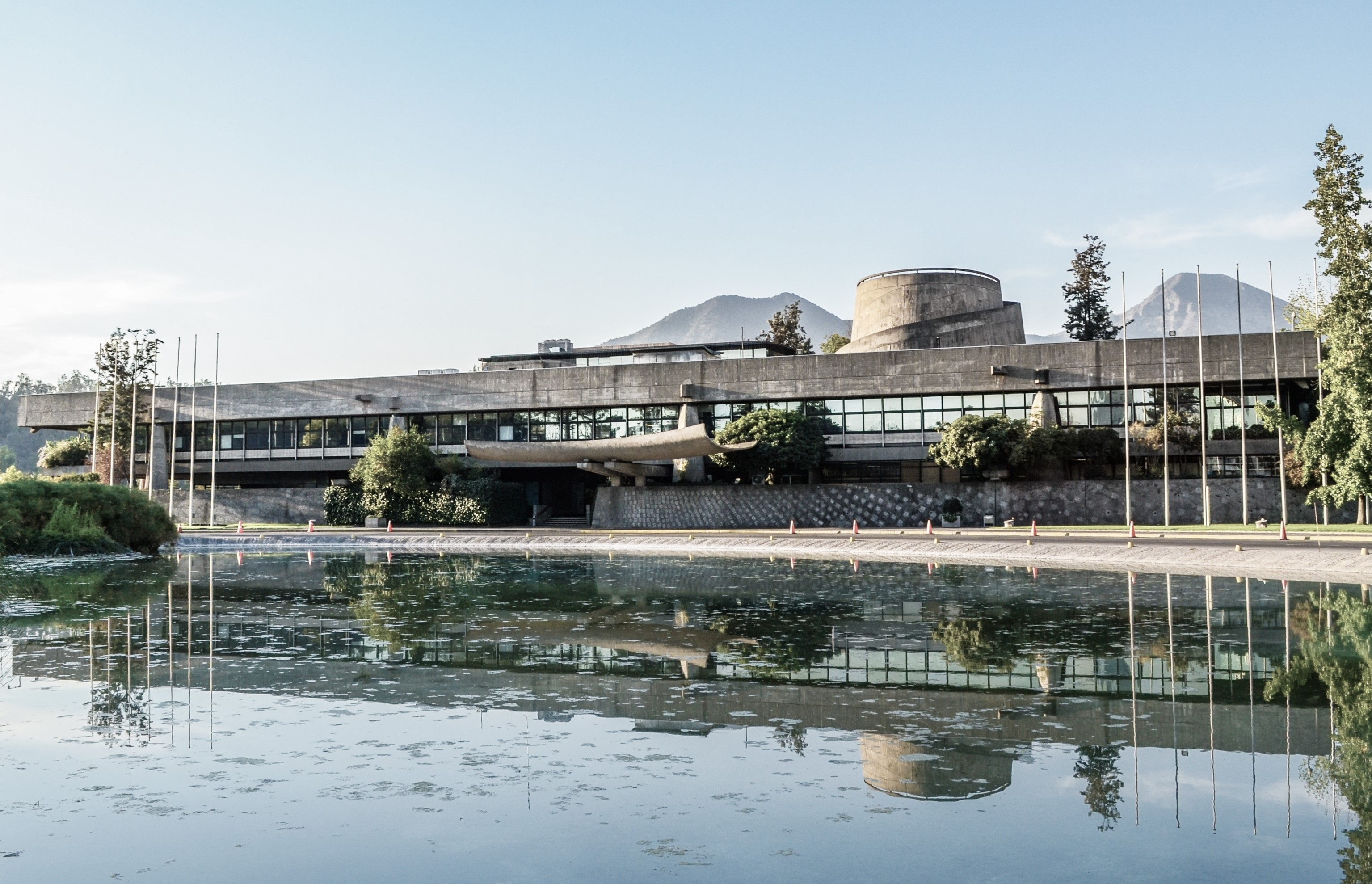
ECLAC headquarters in Santiago

- Santiago, Chile (headquarters)
- Mexico City, Mexico (Central American subregional headquarters)
- Port of Spain, Trinidad and Tobago (Caribbean subregional headquarters)
- Bogotá, Colombia (country office)
- Brasília, Brazil (country office)
- Buenos Aires, Argentina (country office)
- Montevideo, Uruguay (country office)
- Washington, DC, United States of America (liaison office)

== Member states ==
Map showing the member states of ECLAC

The following are all member states of ECLAC:

- Antigua and Barbuda
- Argentina
- Bahamas
- Barbados
- Belize
- Bolivia (Plurinational State of)
- Brazil
- Canada
- Chile
- Colombia
- Costa Rica
- Cuba
- Dominica
- Dominican Republic
- Ecuador
- El Salvador
- France
- Germany
- Grenada
- Guatemala
- Guyana
- Haiti
- Honduras
- Italy
- Jamaica
- Japan
- Mexico
- Netherlands
- Nicaragua
- Norway
- Panama
- Paraguay
- Peru
- Portugal
- Saint Kitts and Nevis
- Saint Lucia
- Saint Vincent and the Grenadines
- Republic of Korea
- Spain
- Suriname
- Turkey
- Trinidad and Tobago
- United Kingdom of Great Britain and Northern Ireland
- Uruguay
- Venezuela, Bolivarian Republic of

=== Associate members ===
The following are all associate members of ECLAC:

- Anguilla
- Aruba
- Bermuda
- British Virgin Islands
- Cayman Islands
- Curaçao
- Guadeloupe
- Martinique
- Montserrat
- Puerto Rico
- Sint Maarten
- Turks and Caicos Islands
- United States Virgin Islands
- French Guiana

=== Former member states ===
- United States of America

== Foreign investment ==
A number of the political governments of the region maintain foreign direct investment promotion agencies in partnership with entities such as the World Association of Investment Promotion Agencies. Additionally ECLAC/CEPAL cooperates on regional annual conferences with CAF – Development Bank of Latin America and the Caribbean and the bloc overlaps with the Community of Latin American and Caribbean States based in Uruguay.

== See also ==
- List of currencies in the Americas
- List of stock exchanges in the Americas
- Library of the Economic Commission for Latin America and the Caribbean
- Organization of Latin American and Caribbean Supreme Audit Institutions
- United Nations System
- ELAC Action Plans – Intergovernmental strategy
- Association of Caribbean States
- Community of Latin American and Caribbean States
