= Ministry of Foreign Trade (Costa Rica) =

Government ministry of Costa Rica

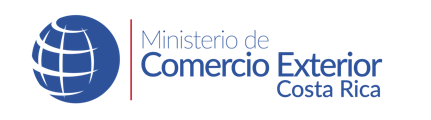

Agency overview
- Formed: 30 October 1996
- Jurisdiction: Costa Rica
- Annual budget: ₡8,001,000,000 (2023)
- Minister responsible: Manuel Tovar Rivera
- Deputy Minister responsible: Indiana Trejos Gallo
- Child agency: Costa Rican Foreign Trade Promoter
- Website: www.comex.go.cr

The Ministry of Foreign Trade (Spanish: Ministerio de Comercio Exterior, COMEX) is the government ministry of Costa Rica responsible for defining and directing the country's external trade and foreign investment policy, as well as handling non-contentious international administration and representing the Costa Rican state abroad in trade and investment matters.

== History ==
During the 2000s, the Ministry of Foreign Trade in Costa Rica operated without a formal legal framework, which posed a challenge in trade negotiations, as most countries already had a dedicated ministry, secretariat, or specialized department in place. There were three institutions tasked with managing different export incentive programs and promoting investments: the National Investment Council, the Center for the Promotion of Exports and Investments (CENPRO), and the Export Free Zone Corporation.

On December 29, 1995, during José María Figueres Olsen's government, 15 members of the National Liberation Party's parliamentary group presented a bill with the aim of creating the Ministry of Foreign Trade (COMEX) and the Costa Rican Foreign Trade Promoter (PROCOMER). They noted that in the previous years, foreign trade had been the main driver of Costa Rica's economy, but the legislation governing the institutional framework was outdated.

The initial bill formally established the Ministry of Foreign Trade and merged the Permanent Delegation of Costa Rica to the World Trade Organization with the trade representatives stationed in diplomatic delegations. Additionally, it gave rise to PROCOMER as the executing arm of the policies set forth by the ministry, bestowing upon it the status of a non-state public entity operating as a public limited company.

The proposal was referred to the Special State Reforms Commission, and it received unanimous approval on April 23, 1996. During the first reading, the bill garnered 38 votes in favor and 2 against, with the opposing votes coming from left-wing party deputies Gerardo Trejos Salas (Democratic Force) and Rodrigo Gutiérrez Schwanhauser (New Democratic Party). The second reading saw 36 votes in favor and 9 against.

The bill was sent to the Presidential House, where it received the signatures of both President José María Figueres Olsen and the Minister of Foreign Trade, José Rossi Umaña, becoming Law 7638 on October 30, 1996. In 1997, José Manuel Salazar-Xirinachs succeeded Rossi as Minister of Foreign Trade.

== Functions ==
COMEX has, among its functions, the following:

1. Define and direct the external trade and foreign investment policy.
2. Lead bilateral and multilateral trade and investment negotiations, and sign treaties and agreements on these matters.
3. Participate, in conjunction with the Ministry of Economy, Industry, and Commerce, the Ministry of Agriculture and Livestock, and the Ministry of Finance, in defining tariff policies.
4. Represent the country at the World Trade Organization and other international trade forums where trade, investment treaties, and related topics are discussed.
5. Establish export regulatory mechanisms when necessary due to restrictions on Costa Rican goods entering other countries.
6. Determine, in consultation with the Minister of Foreign Affairs and Worship and the Ministers overseeing national production, the trade retaliations resulting from international agreements signed by Costa Rica, to be executed in the country by the relevant authorities, following legal procedures and the relevant laws.
7. Develop policies related to exports and investments.
8. Grant and revoke the regime of free-trade zones.
9. Lead and coordinate official plans, strategies, and programs related to exports and investments.

== Organization ==
COMEX is structured with the following departments:

1. Directorate of Trade Negotiations.
2. Directorate of the Permanent Delegation to the WTO.
3. Administrative and Financial Directorate
  - Human Resources Department.
  - Financial Department.
  - Procurement Department.
4. Costa Rican Foreign Trade Promoter

== Bibliography ==
- Legislative Assembly of Costa Rica (1996). Expediente #12482 – Ley #7638 [Bill #12482 – Law #7638] (PDF) (in Spanish). Costa Rica: Library of the Legislative Assembly of Costa Rica. Archived from the original (PDF) on 2023-10-20.
