= Government of Atlanta =

Municipal government of Atlanta, Georgia

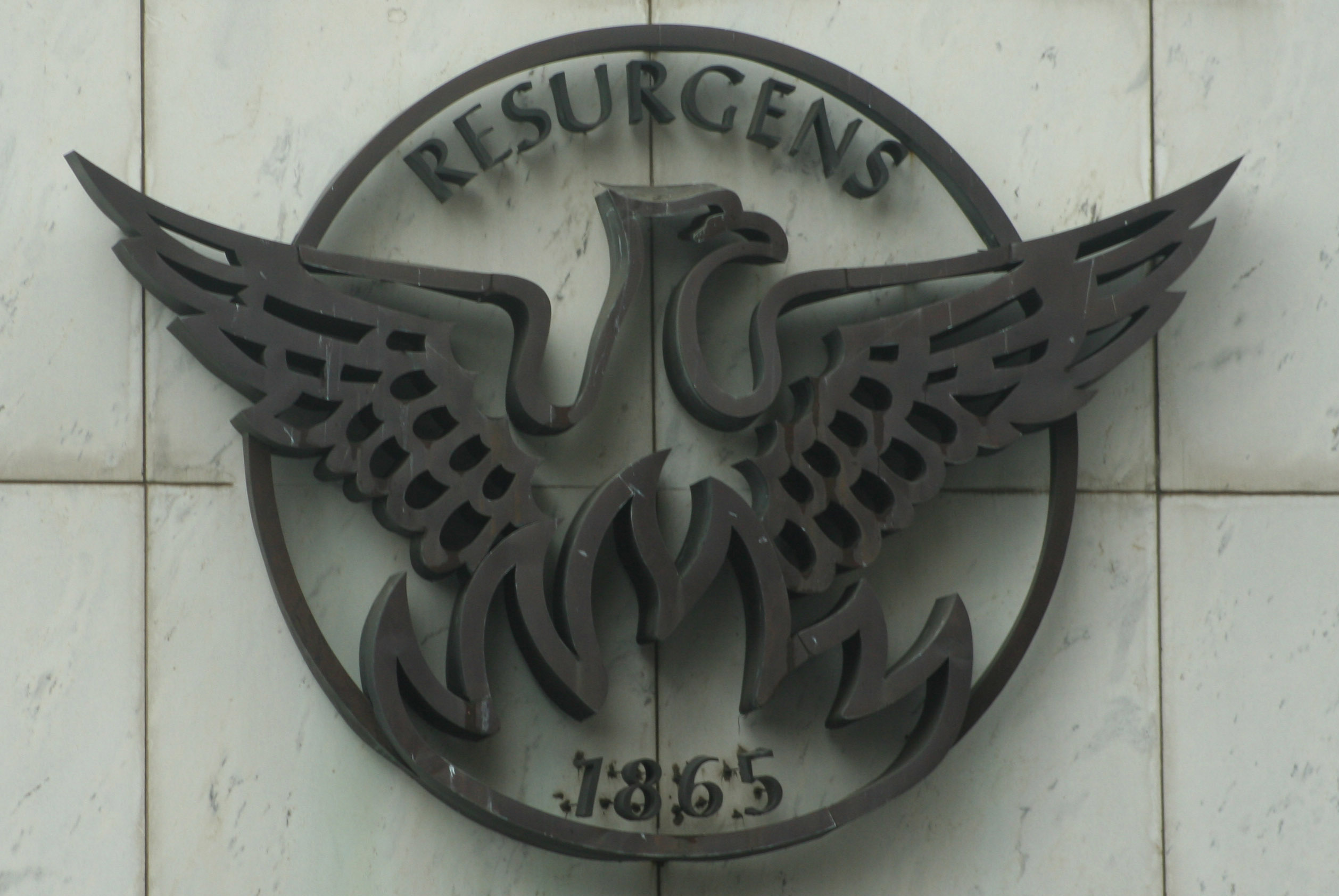
Atlanta city seal

The city government of Atlanta, Georgia, United States, headquartered at Atlanta City Hall, is primarily vested in the Atlanta City Council and Mayor, a mayor-council system. In addition, there is the Atlanta Police Department, Atlanta Fire Rescue Department, the directly-elected Atlanta Board of Education (which administers Atlanta Public Schools), several city departments, and the Atlanta municipal courts.

== Organization ==
=== Mayor ===
The mayor is the Executive Officer for the city and serves a four-year term, limited to two consecutive terms. The mayor makes appointments of heads and staff of departments and commissions with the approval of the council, and is able to veto ordinances passed by the council, with the council able to override vetoes by a two-thirds vote. In addition, the mayor is able to issue executive orders, prepare the annual budget, execute contracts, and assume certain emergency powers during states of emergency.

=== City Council ===
The Atlanta City Council, a 15-member unicameral body, serves as the legislative branch of government, with an elected council representative from each of 12 single-member districts, 3 at-large post seats, and the at-large City Council President who chairs meetings of the council.

- Post 1 representing districts 1–4
- Post 2 representing districts 5–8
- Post 3 representing districts 9–12

The entire slate is elected for four-year terms in odd-year elections (2001, 2005, 2009, etc.).

=== Executive Offices ===
The mayor's office maintains several offices which provide executive oversight over aspects of city government:

- Office of Communications
- Office of Constituent Services
- Office of Contract Compliance
- Office of Cultural Affairs
- Office of Emergency Preparedness
- Office of Film, Entertainment & Nightlife
- Office of Innovation Delivery and Performance
- Office of Intergovernmental Affairs
- Office of International & Immigrant Affairs
- Office of Special Events
- Office of Sustainability and Resilience
- Office of Transparency
- Office of Technology and Innovation
- Office of Violence Reduction
- Office of One Atlanta (formerly Equity, Diversity and Inclusion)
  - Mayor's Division of LGBTQ Affairs
  - Human Relations Commission

=== Departments ===
The mayor appoints the heads of the following departments and offices, all of whom are listed as members of the mayor's cabinet:

- Atlanta Police Department
- Atlanta Fire Rescue Department
- Invest Atlanta (formerly Atlanta Development Authority)
- Atlanta Housing Authority
- Atlanta BeltLine
- Department of Atlanta Information Management
- Department of Aviation
- Department of City Planning
- Department of Corrections
- Department of Customer Service/ATL 311
- Department of Finance
- Department of Grants & Community Development
- Department of Watershed
- Department of Law (managed by the City Attorney)
- Department of Human Resources
- Department of Parks & Recreation
- Department of Procurement
- Department of Transportation
- Department of Labor and Employment Services
- Department of Public Works
- Office of Emergency Preparedness
- Department of Enterprise Assets Management
- Office of One Atlanta
- Office of Technology and Innovation
- Office of International and Immigrant Affairs
- Office of Sustainability & Resilience
- Office of Constituent Services

=== Independent offices ===
Several boards and commissions are appointed by both the mayor and city council, operating independently of both branches:

- Atlanta Citizen Review Board
- Civil Service Board
- City of Atlanta Commission on Aging
- Senior Citizen Anti-Displacement Grant
- City Auditor's Office
- Ethics Office
- General Fund Pension
- Office of the Inspector General
- Police Officers' Pension
- Firefighters' Pension
- COA Pension Investment Board
- Water and Sewer Appeals Board

=== Atlanta Public Schools ===
The Atlanta Public Schools are administered by the Atlanta Board of Education, a nine-member body representing six districts and three at-large posts. It is a separate entity from both the Fulton County School System and DeKalb County School District.

=== Judicial agencies ===
The city government maintains three judicial agencies:

- The Municipal Court of Atlanta consists of ten judges appointed by the mayor.
- The City Solicitor serves as the prosecuting arm of the city government before the Municipal Court.
- The City Public Defender provides public defender services for indigent clients before the Municipal Court, including holistic legal services and community outreach.

== Other governments ==
=== State ===
Atlanta operates under a city charter granted by the Georgia General Assembly; any amendment to the charter requires an act of the state legislature.

=== County ===
Atlanta's borders straddle parts of both Fulton County and DeKalb County. In addition, the mayor of Atlanta serves on the Atlanta Regional Commission, the regional planning and intergovernmental coordination agency for Metro Atlanta.

=== Federal ===
Atlanta is represented in the United States House of Representatives primarily by Georgia's 5th congressional district, with a portion of the city also falling within Georgia's 6th congressional district.

== History ==
In 1954, Atlanta's ward system was replaced by a unicameral Board of Aldermen in which all six members and the Vice-Mayor serving as president were elected citywide, eliminating district representation.

In 1973, a new charter was passed which shifted the city to a district system, taking effect at the start of 1974. A principal architect of that charter was Grace Towns Hamilton, with the purpose of more equitably representing the changing racial composition of the city; the charter's adoption coincided with Maynard Jackson taking office as the city's first Black mayor.

Under the 1974 charter, the Vice-Mayor and Board of Aldermen were replaced by a directly elected Council President and a City Council comprising 12 single-member districts and 6 at-large posts. In 1996, the charter was amended, effective January 1998, reducing the number of at-large posts from six to three, yielding the current structure of 12 district members and 3 at-large posts plus the council president.

== See also ==
- Atlanta City Council
- Atlanta City Hall
- Atlanta Police Department
- Atlanta Fire Rescue Department
- Atlanta Board of Education
- Atlanta Public Schools
- Metropolitan Atlanta Rapid Transit Authority
- Atlanta Regional Commission
- Government of Georgia (U.S. state)
