= China Investment Promotion Agency =

Chinese government body

China Investment Promotion Agency (CIPA, Chinese: 商务部投资促进事务局) is the investment promotion agency of the People's Republic of China. It is in charge of inviting in (FDI in China) and going global (outbound investment). Two-way investment promotion works in line with China's economic strategies and is engaged in cooperation with international economic organizations, foreign investment promotion agencies, chambers of commerce and business associations on behalf of the Ministry of Commerce. CIPA is part of the Ministry of Commerce of the PRC.

== See also ==
- China Council for the Promotion of International Trade
