= Gustavo Martínez Cabañas =

Mexican economist

Gustavo Martínez Cabañas (6 July 1911 – 2003) was a Mexican public administrator and economist. In 1949, he was appointed the first Executive Secretary of the Economic Commission for Latin America and the Caribbean (ECLAC), but remained in that position for only a year and was replaced by Raúl Prebisch. He also worked at the National Autonomous University of Mexico as Professor of Public Administration and Economics, and in various consulting capacities with the United Nations, the Committee to Reform Mexico's Public Administration, the Organization of American States (OAS) and the Inter-American Development Bank. He has written many papers, reports and financial studies dealing mainly with different aspects of Mexico's economy and public administration.
