= Invest KOREA =

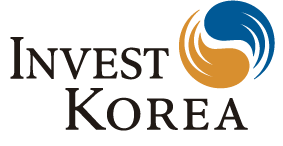
- Type: Government Agency
- Founded: July 1998
- Headquarters: 13 Heolleungno, Seocho-gu, Seoul, Rep. of Korea
- Key people: Tae Hyung Kim, Commissioner
- Products: Inbound/outbound FDI and Reshoring Promotion
- Website: www.investkorea.org

Invest KOREA (IK) is the national investment promotion agency of Republic of Korea, established within KOTRA (Korea Trade-Investment Promotion Agency) in 1998 to attract Foreign Direct Investment (FDI) into Korea. Since 2018, its functions have expanded to include support for Korean companies' overseas investments and reshoring, providing comprehensive support for cross-border investments related to Korea.

== Services ==
Invest KOREA provides comprehensive services across all stages of global companies' investment in Korea through collaboration with Foreign Investor Support Center (FISC) and the Office of Foreign Investment Ombudsman (Ombudman) located in KOTRA HQs together.

In addition to matters related to global companies' investment in Korea, Invest KOREA also aids in the overseas expansion of Korea companies and the reshoring of overseas Korean enterprises through cooperation with the Korea Investment Support Centers (20 locations) and Reshoring Support Centers (20 locations) in KOTRA's overseas offices worldwide.

Stage	Task	Department	Details
Investment Promotion	Investment Target Matchmaking	Invest KOREA	Investment target region for greenfield investment and target companies for brownfield investment
Investment Promotion	Preliminary Information	Invest KOREA	Providing necessary information for a company's investment feasibility study
Investment Promotion	Incentive Consultation	Invest KOREA	Providing necessary information about FDI incentives and support Cash Grant negotiation with the Korean government
Investment Promotion	Consultation in Specialized Fields	FISC	Conducting consultaions regarding incentives, law, accounting, taxation, locations, etc.
Investment Facilitation	Registration of Foreign-Invested Company	FISC	Issuing Foreign-Invested Enterprise Registration Certificates
Investment Facilitation	Receipt of Foreign Investment Report	FISC	Issuing Certificate of Completion of Report
Investment Facilitation	Support for Administrative Procedure for Investment	FISC	Offering administrative services and consultations related to corporta registration, permits, and licenses for investment execution
Investment Facilitation	Visa Issuance Support	FISC	Supporting for issuing visas such as foreign investor (D-8) and accompanying family (F-3)
Aftercare	Grievance Handling	Ombudsman	Resolving difficulties of foreign-invested companies through the designation of Home Doctors
Aftercare	Residency Support	FISC	Providing settlement support and fostering a stable living environment for employees of foreign-invested compaies and their accompanying families

== Awards ==
- WAIPA (World Association of Investment Promotion Agencies) Investment Excellence Awards - AI Trailblazer (2025)
- UN Investment Promotion Awards - Excellence in Scaling Up Energy Transition Investments (2023)
- UN Investment Promotion Awards - Excellence in Promoting Investment in Health (2021)

== Participation in International Organizations ==
- WAIPA (World Association of Investment Promotion Agencies) Member IPA (1998-)
- WAIPA East Asia & South-East Asia Regional Director (2015-)
- WAIPA Vice President (2025-)
- OECD IPA Network Member IPA (2026-)

== History ==
Established in July 1998 as the Korea Investment Support Center under KOTRA, Invest KOREA is strengthening its functions in response to changes in the domestic and international environment.

- August 1995: Foreign investment promotion functions added to KOTRA.
- April 1998: KOTRA officially designated by the Korean government as the national investment promotion agency.
- July 1998: Korea Investment Support Center established within KOTRA.
- October 1999: The Office of the Foreign Investment Ombudsman opened within KOTRA to strengthen foreign investment aftercare.
- December 2003: Foreign Investment Center relaunched as Invest KOREA.
- May 2018: Invest KOREA started to support domestic companies' overseas investment.
- February 2019: Invest KOREA started to support reshoring of overseas Korean enterprises.

== Structure ==
Invest KOREA consists of its headquarters at KOTRA and 36 overseas investment promotion offices in 20 countries worldwide. It implements policies related to foreign investment, established by the Ministry of Trade, Industry and Resources, in cooperation with Foreign Investor Support Center and the Office of Foreign Investment Ombudsman at KOTRA headquarters.

Invest KOREA

The headquarters consist of three departments (eight teams), and 36 overseas investment promotion offices carry out foreign investment promotion activities under strategies set by headquarters.

- Investment Planning Department: Investment Strategy Team, Investment Public Relations Team, Regional Investment Cooperation Team
- Investment Promotion Department: Advanced Industry Investment Promotion Team, Core Industry Investment Promotion Team, Service Industry Investment Promotion Team
- Overseas Investment & Reshoring Support Department: Outbound Investment & M&A Team, Reshoring Support Team

Foreign Investor Support Center

The center provides administrative support at all stage of foreign investment for foreign investors and foreign-invested companies, as well as settlement assistance for employees and their families in Korea. A team of 20 professional personnel, including government officials specializing visas, taxation, customs, environment, and location, offers a one-stop service for foreign investment administration.

The Office of Foreign Investment Ombudsman

Since its establishment in 1999, the Office has supported the resolution of difficulties for foreign-invested companies. The Foreign Investment Ombudsman, appointed by the President of the Republic of Korea, oversees the Office of the Foreign Investment Ombudsman, which is composed of experts in fields such as accounting, law, and labor.

== Former and Current Commissioners ==
- (1st) Alan Timblick: 2003.12.5. ~ 2005.12.4.
- (2nd) Tong Soo CHUNG: 2006.2.16. ~ 2010.3.15.
- (3rd) Hongchul Ahn: 2010.3.16. ~ 2012.3.15.
- (4th) Ki Won Han: 2012.4.1. ~ 2015.12.31.
- (5th) Yong-kook Kim: 2016.2.11. ~ 2018.8.31.
- (6th) Shawn Chang: 2018.9.1. ~ 2023.1.18.
- (Present) Dr. Tae Hyung Kim: 2023.1.19. ~

== Invest KOREA Summit ==
Invest KOREA hosts the Invest KOREA Summit (IKS), Republic of Korea's flagship national investor relations event, to promote the country's investment environment and facilitate foreign direct investment. The summit serves as a comprehensive platform where global investors, domestic and foreign corporations, and government officials gather to explore investment opportunities in high-tech and strategic industries.

History

The event was established in 2006 as the "Foreign Investment Festival" and has since evolved in name and format to align with national policy priorities.

- Foreign Investment Festival (2006–2007) / Forum (2008–2009) / Week (2010–2016): The inaugural event was held in 2006 in conjunction with the completion of the Invest KOREA Plaza (IKP), presided over by President Roh Moo-hyun. Subsequent iterations, such as the 10th anniversary in 2014, featured congratulatory messages from the head of state, underscoring its national significance.
- Invest KOREA Week (2017–2022): Rebranded as Invest KOREA Week, the event transitioned to an online conference format in 2020 and 2021 due to the COVID-19 pandemic.
- Invest KOREA Summit (2023–Present): In 2023, the event was upgraded to a "Summit" to enhance its global standing and encourage high-level participation. That year, it was held in Busan for the first time to support the city's bid for the 2030 World Expo. The 2025 summit was held simultaneously in Seoul and Gyeongju, coordinated with the 2025 APEC CEO Summit.

Programs and Key Achievements

The summit typically spans three days and consists of several high-level sessions:

- Invest KOREA Conference: A keynote session where the South Korean government and companies present their future economic vision and investment policies .
- Investment Ceremony: A platform for global corporations to officially announce and commit their investment intentions in the Korean market.
- Industry-specific Forums: These sessions offer in-depth discussions on the investment climate and regulatory landscape of Korea's strategic sectors. The forums focus on advanced industries—including AI, semiconductors, secondary batteries, and bio-health—featuring insights from industry experts and government policymakers.
- Site Visits: To provide a firsthand look at Korea's industrial infrastructure, the summit organizes guided tours to major regional industrial clusters and Free Economic Zones (FEZs). Participants visit key manufacturing and R&D sites to verify the actual investment environment and logistical capabilities.

The summit attracts over 2,000 participants annually, including representatives from approximately 200 foreign-invested companies, facilitating business matching between promising local firms and global investors. In 2025, the event recorded a record-high investment notification of $1.21 billion from 14 global companies.

Past National IR Presentations

- Invest KOREA Summit 2023: Korea's Business Environment
- Invest KOREA Summit 2024: Korea's Path to Global Supply Chain Leadership
- Invest KOREA Summit 2025: Korea's Real Engine of the AI Revolution: Manufacturing AI Transformation (M.AX)

== See also ==
- Investment promotion agency
- KOTRA
