= List of people from Ávila, Spain =

This is a list of people from Ávila, Spain:

- Quintana Olleras painter
- Priscillian, Christian theologian and martyr
- Isabella I of Castile
- Blasco Núñez Vela, first viceroy of Peru
- Pedro de la Gasca, bishop and diplomat
- Pedro de Villagra, governor of Chile
- Gil González Dávila, conquistador
- John of the Cross, Catholic saint
- Gil González Dávila, friar and chronicler
- Tomás Luis de Victoria, musician
- George Santayana, philosopher and essayist
- Claudio Sánchez-Albornoz y Menduiña, President of the Government of the Spanish Republic in Exile
- Adolfo Suárez, politician and lawyer
- José Jiménez Lozano, narrator, essayist, poet and journalist
- Feliciano Rivilla, footballer
- Carlos Sastre, cyclist
- Julio Jiménez, professional cyclist
- Ángel Hernández, long jumper
- Agustín Rodríguez Sahagún, politician
- Ángel Acebes, politician
- Sonsoles Espinosa, wife of former Prime Minister of Spain, José Luis Rodríguez Zapatero

== See also ==
- Teresa of Avila
