= Carlos Quintana (engineer) =

Mexican engineer and international functionary (1912–1987)

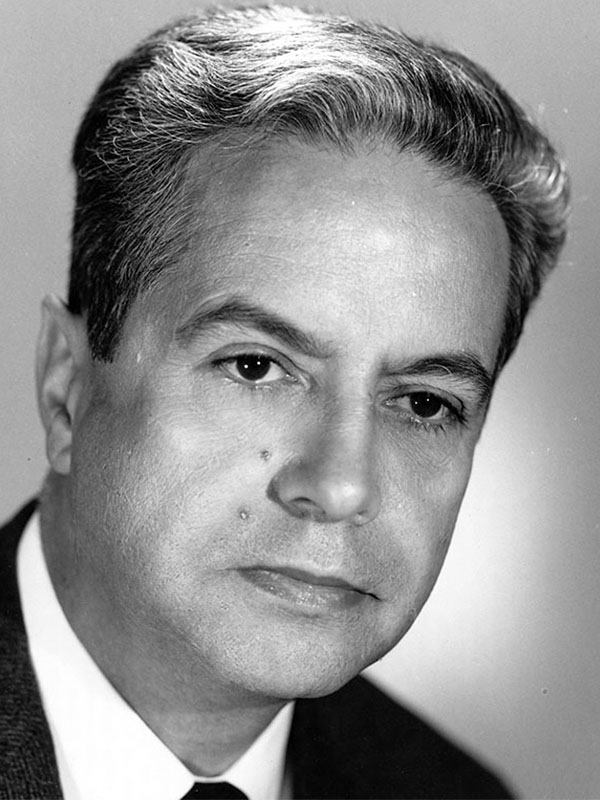

Executive Secretary of the Economic Commission for Latin America
- In office 1 January 1967 – 1 March 1972

Personal details
- Born: 8 October 1912 Puebla, Puebla, Mexico
- Died: 13 June 1987 (aged 74) Mexico City, Mexico
- Education: IPN, Columbia, Harvard

Carlos Quintana Gómez-Daza (Note: In this Hispanic American name, the first or paternal surname is Quintana and the second or maternal family name is Gómez-Daza.) (8 October 1912 – 13 June 1987) was a Mexican engineer and international functionary. From 1967 to 1972, he served as the executive secretary of the UN's Economic Commission for Latin America (ECLA).

Carlos Quintana was born in Puebla, Puebla, in 1912. He studied at the National Polytechnic Institute (IPN) in Mexico City and earned master's degrees in industrial engineering (Columbia University, 1944) and business administration (Harvard University, 1947) from institutions in the United States. He also taught at the National Polytechnic Institute from 1935 to 1942 and, from 1944 to 1950, was employed in the industrial research department of the Bank of Mexico (Banxico).

In 1950 he began working at the Economic Commission for Latin America (ECLA), (Note: Renamed "Economic Commission for Latin America and the Caribbean" (ECLAC) in 1984.) one of the regional commissions of the United Nations Economic and Social Council, including a period as director of its Industrial Development Division. In 1960 he returned from Chile to take up a position with Nacional Financiera, Mexico's development bank. On 1 January 1967, Secretary-General U Thant appointed him executive secretary of ECLA, a position he held from 20 January of that year until 1 March 1972. The second Mexican national to hold the position of executive secretary, he was succeeded by Enrique Iglesias of Uruguay.

At the end of his term with ECLA, he returned to Mexico where he worked with the Instituto Mexicano de Investigaciones Tecnológicas and, again, with Nacional Financiera.

Carlos Quintana died in Mexico City on 13 June 1987.
