= José Manuel Salazar-Xirinachs =

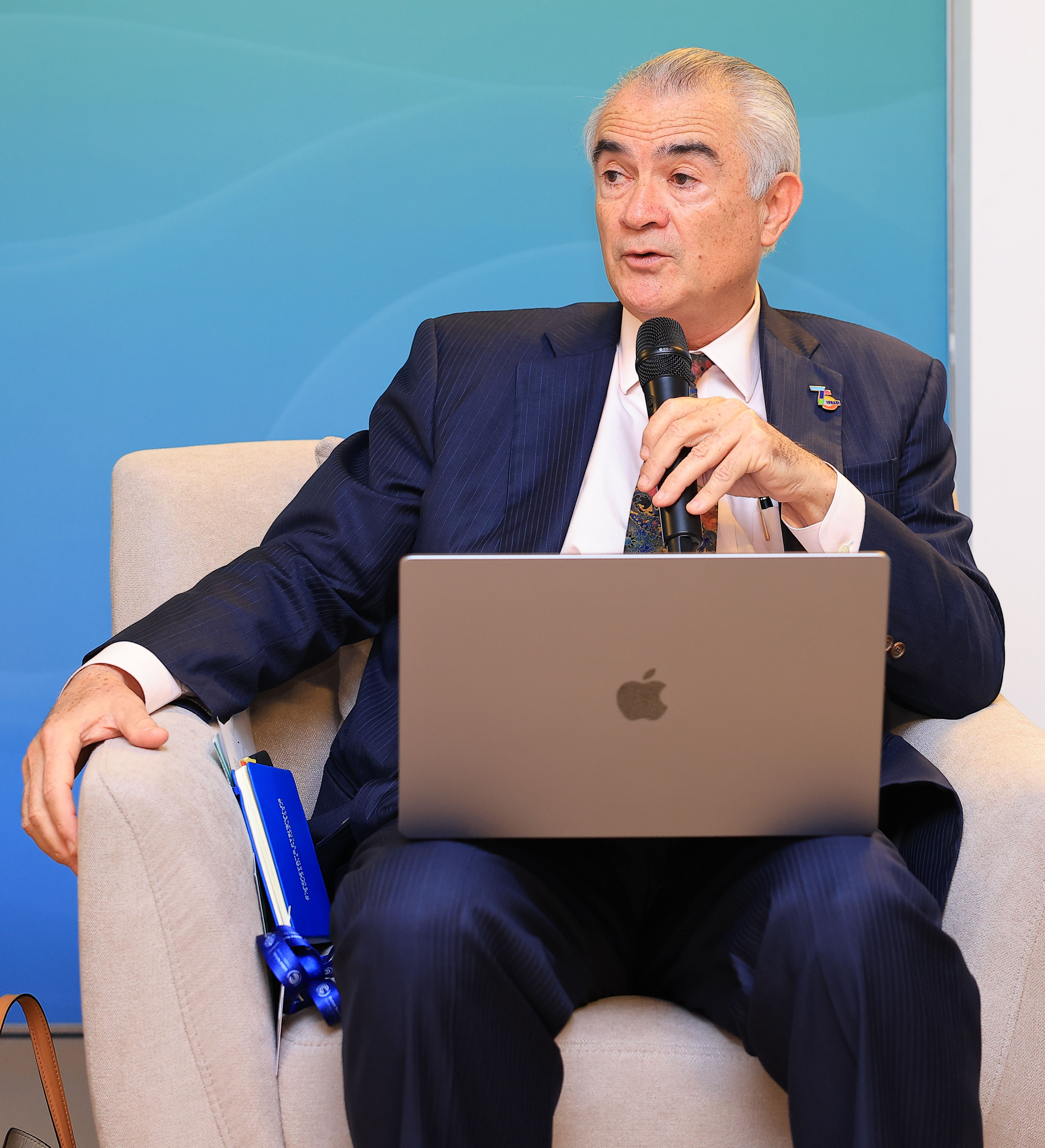
- Salazar-Xirinachs at COP30 in 2025

Executive Secretary, ECLAC
- Incumbent
- Assumed office 1 October 2022
- Preceded by: Alicia Bárcena

Regional Director for Latin America and the Caribbean, ILO
- In office June 2015 – October 2018

Minister of Foreign Trade
- In office January 1997 – May 1998
- President: José María Figueres
- Preceded by: José Maria Rossi Umaña
- Succeeded by: Samuel Guzowski Rose

Personal details
- Born: 1953 (age 72–73) San José, Costa Rica
- Education: Universidad de Costa Rica (BS); University of Cambridge (Ph.D.)

José Manuel Salazar-Xirinachs (born 1953) is a Costa Rican economist, politician and diplomat. He was Minister of Foreign Trade from 1997 to 1998. He has been Executive Secretary of the United Nations Economic Commission for Latin America and the Caribbean (ECLAC) since 2022.

== Career ==
José Manuel Salazar-Xirinachs was born in San José in 1953. In 1976, he obtained a bachelor's degree in Economics from the University of Costa Rica. He obtained a Ph.D. from the University of Cambridge in 1993.

He was Executive President of the Costa Rican Development Corporation CODESA, a government agency, and Executive Director of FEDEPRICAP (Federación de Entidades Privadas de Centroamerica y Panamá), a private sector think tank.

In the final two years of the Figueres presidency, 1997–1998, Salazar-Xirinachs was Minister of Foreign Trade. In that capacity, he was chairman of the negotiations for the Free Trade Agreement of the Americas.

After his term in the Figueres government, Salazar-Xirinachs joined the Organization of American States (OAS). In 2005 he joined the International Labour Organization (ILO), where he became Regional Director for Latin America and the Caribbean in 2015.

United Nations Secretary-General António Guterres appointed Salazar-Xirinachs as Executive Secretary of the Economic Commission for Latin America and the Caribbean in September 2022.

== Publications (selection) ==
Salazar-Xirinachs has authored articles, papers and book chapters about development issues. He is co-author of:

- Toward Free Trade in the Americas, Brookings Institution, 2001
- Trade and Employment: from Myths to Facts, International Labour Organization, 2011
- Transforming economies: Making industrial policy work for growth, jobs and development. ILO, 2014.

== Honors and awards ==
- 2024 Maestro Ricardo Torres Gaitán Honorary Chair, National Autonomous University of Mexico
