= Library of the Economic Commission for Latin America and the Caribbean =

Coordinates: 33°24′08″S 70°36′02″W

- Biblioteca de la Comisión Económica para América Latina y el Caribe
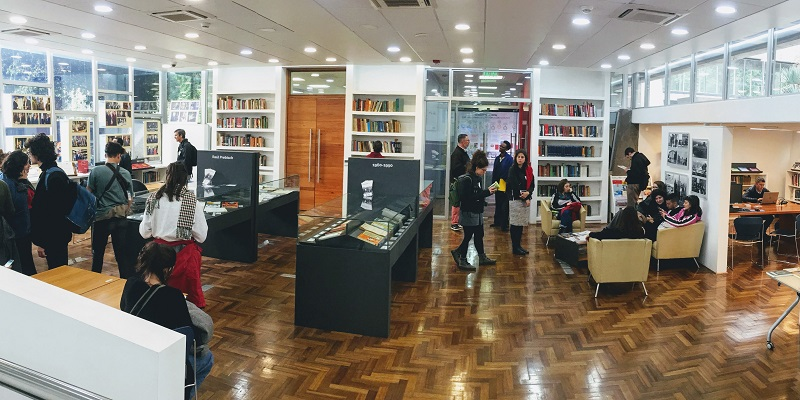
- Main room of the Hernán Santa Cruz Library, Santiago
- Location: Santiago, Mexico City, Brasília, Port of Spain, Chile; Brazil; Mexico; Trinidad and Tobago
- Established: 1948
- Branches: 4

Collection

Access and use
- Access requirements: Previous contact

Other information
- Website: https://www.cepal.org/en/library

The Library of the Economic Commission for Latin America and the Caribbean was established in 1948 as part of the creation of the Economic Commission for Latin America and the Caribbean; this coincided with the inauguration of the Economic Commission for Latin America by the United Nations, in support of its mandate in the region. The Library has four branches: the Hernán Santa Cruz Library in Santiago, the Centro de Recursos de Información y Distribución de Documentos in Mexico City, the Raúl Prebisch Library in Brasília and the Caribbean Knowledge Management Centre in Port of Spain. These four form the ECLAC Library.

The library contains 109,000 books, 1,400 scientific journals and 44,200 digital documents.

== History ==
An essential part of the mission of the Economic Commission for Latin America and the Caribbean is to conduct research and gather, organise, interpret and disseminate information and data related to the economic and social development of the region.

The library also provides digital access to an unfathomable wealth of information, far greater than a single library could maintain in a physical space. As specialists in information organization and retrieval, it supports a network of libraries that continuously refines a portfolio of digital and physical subscriptions tailored to the use of ECLAC researchers.

=== Mission and Vision ===
The Library's mission is to provide access to the information resources it holds, in addition to training and research support services through the organization, conservation and dissemination of various resources, in particular the Commission's intellectual heritage. The Library aims to provide specialized information services primarily to ECLAC officials, extending attention to specialized United Nations agencies based in Santiago, Chile, regional and government organizations, embassies, and researchers, academics and higher education students. Its aim is to provide access to the Library's information resources in its various formats, training and other research support services; through the acquisition, organization, conservation and dissemination of various resources, in particular the Commission's intellectual heritage; in a timely, reliable and relevant manner according to the specific needs of the Commission's work programme and the community at large.

=== The ECLAC Library in the face of COVID-19 pandemic ===
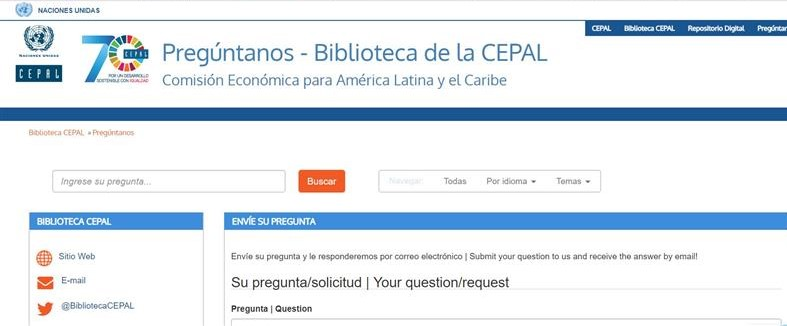
"Ask us" section of the ECLAC Library website

Due to the COVID-19 pandemic, the staff of the ECLAC Library (Santiago, Brasília, Mexico City and Port-of-Spain), have become remote workers. Attempts are being made to meet the needs of external users through email, the ask us section of the website and the Libchat service to guide them in accessing open electronic resources (repository, libguides, etc.) and deliver documents in digital format. ECLAC staff have been strongly supported and trained to achieve full access to the Library's resource from outside of ECLAC's compound, providing consistent assistance to their queries while taking advantage of all available means of contact (Mail, Libchat, Teams, etc.) and also organizing frequent individual and group virtual training activities.

== Locations ==
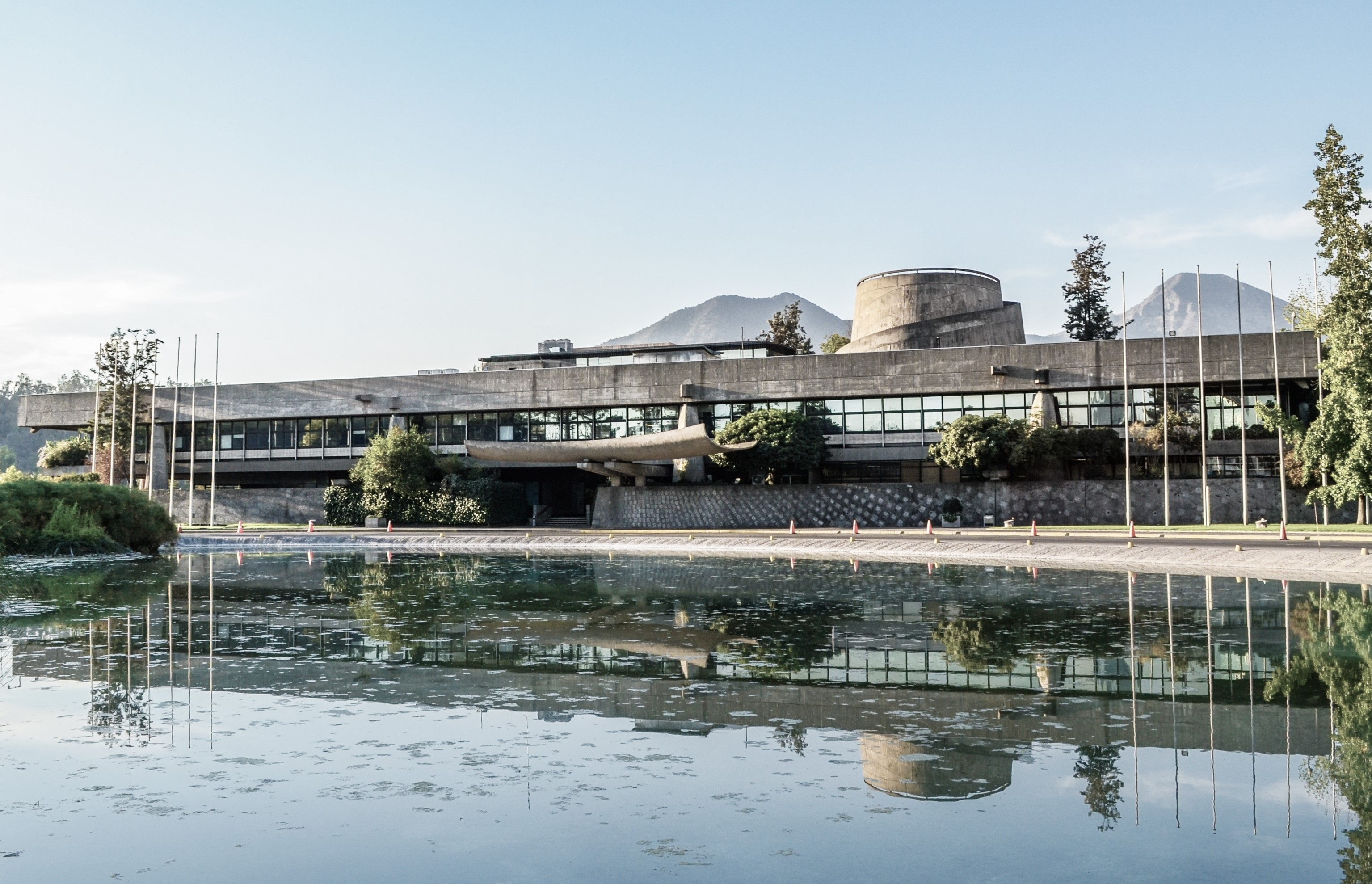
ECLAC headquarters in Santiago

- Santiago, Chile (headquarters)
- Mexico City, Mexico (Central American subregional headquarters)
- Port of Spain, Trinidad and Tobago (Caribbean subregional headquarters)
- Brasília, Brazil (country office)

=== The Hernán Santa Cruz Library ===
The Hernán Santa Cruz Library is the main and oldest library located at the headquarters of the Organization, in Santiago, Chile. It is known as the ECLAC Library – was inaugurated in 1948, the same year that the Economic Commission for Latin America and the Caribbean was founded. It was established to provide specialized information services on the economic and social development of Latin America and the Caribbean, in support of the Commission's work program. The Library is located in the United Nations building, ECLAC headquarters in Santiago, Chile. The Building is considered a landmark of modern Latin American architecture.

In 2008, the Library was named Hernán Santa Cruz Library, after a lawyer and prominent Chilean diplomat who proposed in June 1947 the creation of the Economic Commission for Latin America (ECLA), to support the economic and social development of the region. At the same time, he was a member of the Drafting Committee of the Universal Declaration of Human Rights, proclaimed in 1948.

==== Renovation of the Hernan Santa Cruz Library ====
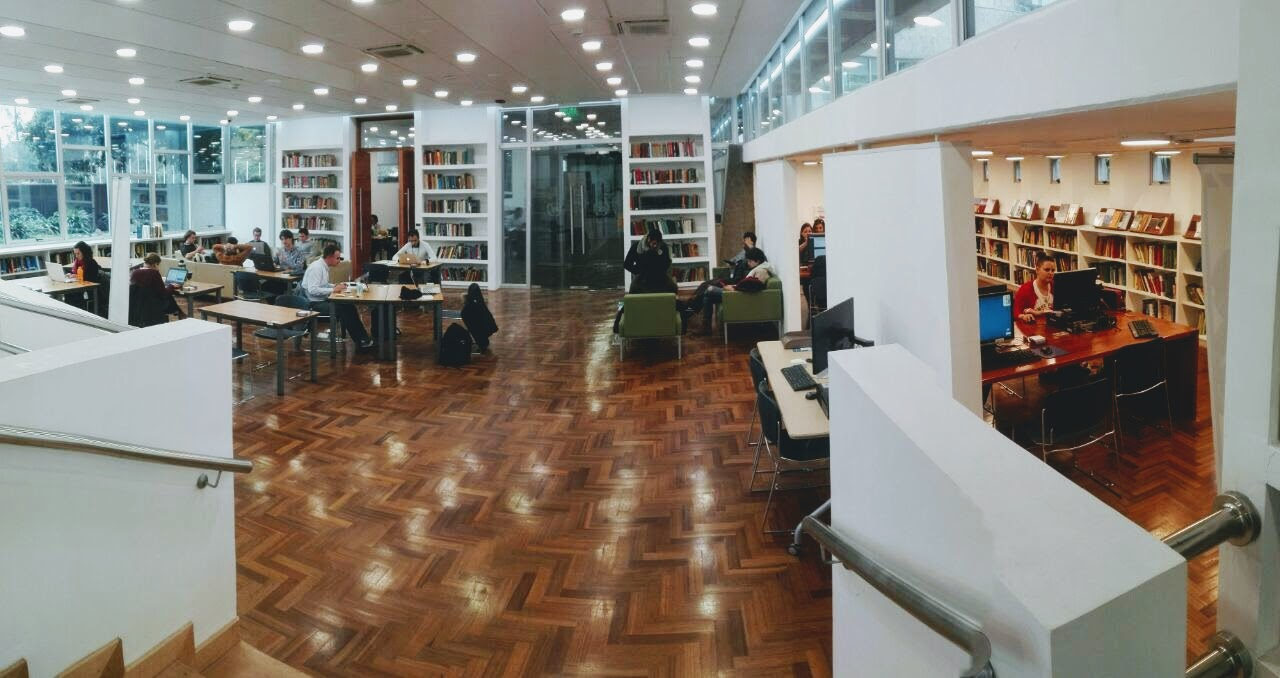
Hernán Santa Cruz Library, Santiago, Chile

In 2015, the renovation of the library began, ending in May 2016 with the transformation of the Library in Santiago into a modern and flexible space, accessible not only to Commission staff but also to those attending meetings, workshops and events of the organization. With a new concept of open shelving, with its collections in view and within easy access, it became an area comfortable for study, individual reading and group work. A space for information, research, reflection and also to communicate and work collaboratively.

==== Collections and Services ====
It currently has a collection of more than 150,000 physical volumes, including books, magazines, photographs, official documents, among others. It also has a significant volume of digital resources such as books, electronic magazines and databases. Thematic coverage of their collections includes the disciplines of the social sciences, such as economics, social development, international trade, sustainable development, planning, gender studies, natural resources, infrastructure, among others.

There is also an important collection of books and documents by leading economists that have been a fundamental axis to the thinking at ECLAC with regard to theories of the development of Latin American economies, such as Celso Furtado, Aníbal Pinto, Fernando Fajnzylber, and Raúl Prebisch.

The ECLAC Library adheres to the mandate that preserves the institutional intellectual heritage, resulting in the "José Besa García" archive. It preserves all of the official publications of the Commission since 1948 and recounts the work of the Commission in its more than 70 years of history. The digital version of the archive is available through its institutional Repository.

The doors of the Hernan Santa Cruz Library are open to students, academics, researchers, diplomats, public officials and the community in general. In collaboration with the Public Information Unit of ECLAC, the library organizes Group Visits to the Commission.

=== Center for Information Resources and Document Distribution ===
The Center for Information Resources and Document Distribution (CRIDD), of the subregional headquarters of ECLAC in Mexico, supports ECLAC's research mandate by facilitating access to information resources. The CRIDD distributes the intellectual production of ECLAC, which is directed mainly to the economic decision makers of Mexico and Central America.

Among its objectives, it stands out to collaborate with regional organizations for the development of shared information services and mutual support networks, facilitate access to information and statistics, streamline research processes, preserve ECLAC's intellectual production and disseminate its work between students and academics in the region.

==== Collections and Services ====
Its collection consists mainly of books, United Nations publications, selected pages and ECLAC manuals, co-editions, periodicals, magazines and bulletins. The CRIDD is part of a wide network of libraries in the subregion with which it conducts interlibrary exchanges and loans. In addition to supporting ECLAC officials in their research, it responds to requests from the general public, academics, and officials of the subregion. In addition, it is present at ECLAC events, where it offers information on ECLAC's work and makes its publications known to attendees.

=== Caribbean Knowledge Management Centre ===
The library of the ECLAC subregional headquarters for the Caribbean, which was established in 1966 along with the then ECLA Office for the Caribbean, is located in Port of Spain, Trinidad and Tobago. As part of the Caribbean Knowledge Management Centre (CKMC), it provides reference and information services to the secretariat and membership of the ECLAC Caribbean Development and Cooperation Committee (CDCC), in support of its work programme and activities in regional cooperation and integration.

As one of the substantive units at ECLAC Caribbean, the CKMC supports ICT for development and knowledge management initiatives through the organization of workshops and the convening expert group meetings. It also provides technical advisory services to the CDCC Member countries and Associate members, and disseminates technical research reports to key stakeholders, policymakers and members of the research community in the Caribbean subregion. Furthermore, the CKMC promotes access to key Caribbean data, news, national, regional and international research documents and information resources for sustainable development through the Caribbean Development Portal.

==== Collection and Services ====
The library in Port of Spain contributes to the expansion, preservation and promotion of access to ECLAC Caribbean publications and resources in the ECLAC Digital Repository through its digitization and cataloguing services. It also provides access to a variety of print and electronic resources through the online metasearch engine, Explora – which is the union catalogue of the ECLAC libraries in Santiago, Mexico City and Port of Spain. This online catalogue also provides access to the bibliographic records of the UN libraries in New York and Geneva.

==== Electronic resources and remote access ====
The CKMC offers remote access to its services and resources through joint participation in innovative ICT solutions, such as the EZProxy for subscription-based resources, and the online LibChat services for research queries in real time. The library also provides researchers with access to vital resources that are not in its collections through cooperation activities with local, regional and global interlibrary loan and document delivery networks. The Caribbean Knowledge Management Centre is accessible to staff within the UN System of Organizations, regional and intergovernmental organizations, academic researchers and students, the general public, research institutes, government officials and diplomats. In September of 2020, the CKMC held its first virtual library book display during the Twenty-eighth session of the Caribbean Development and Cooperation Committee, which included publications on the impacts of COVID-19 in Latin America and the Caribbean.

=== The Raúl Prebisch Library ===
The ECLAC Library in Brazil (The Raúl Prebisch Library) started its activities in Brasília in 1980, with the objective of meeting the requests of the staff, (mainly that of the Office in Brazil, of IPEA researches and some library users of some Brazilian universities), collaborating with the development of their work and supporting their research needs in the economic and social spheres of Latin America and the Caribbean.

After, due to external demand, the library began to extend its information activities to other users, such as: consultants, economists, researches from various national research institutes, Brazilian government officials (ministers, deputies, senators, advisors), members of the diplomatic body in Brasília (ambassadors), teachers, undergraduate and graduate students, interns and journalists, all interested in the work of ECLAC and the Latin American and Caribbean region.

== Digital Repository ==
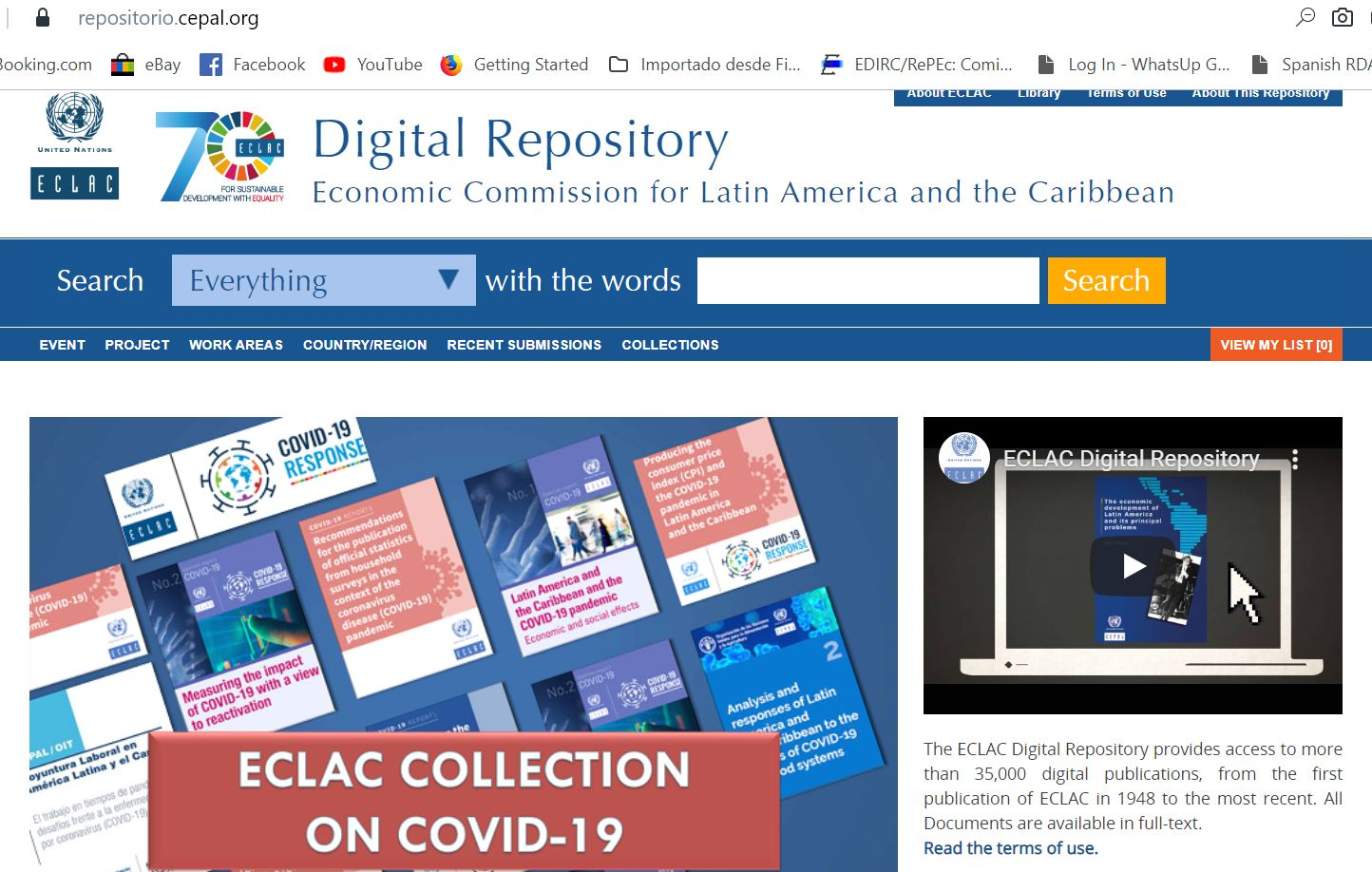
Main page of the Digital Repository

The Digital Repository, inaugurated by the Library in the year 2014, ensures open access and preservation of all publications produced by the Economic Commission for Latin America and the Caribbean since its creation in 1948. All collections of books, journals, series, manuals, statistical reports, meeting documents and even multimedia resources like photographs and videos, more than 44,200 records in several languages, may be read online and downloaded from any place in the world. Its development included free software and database widely used through the world, like Dspace, Apache Tomcat and PosgreSQL, including international standards for digitization and digital preservation as PDF/A and optical character recognition (OCR). In August 2020, the digital repository reached more than 23 million document downloads, contributing to the visibility of all ECLAC documentary heritage, in key areas of the economic, social and sustainable development of Latin America and the Caribbean, and it is included among the main academic repositories in the world. Currently, its metadata is visible through an OAI-PMH Protocol.
