= Alicia Bárcena =

Mexican biologist (born 1952)

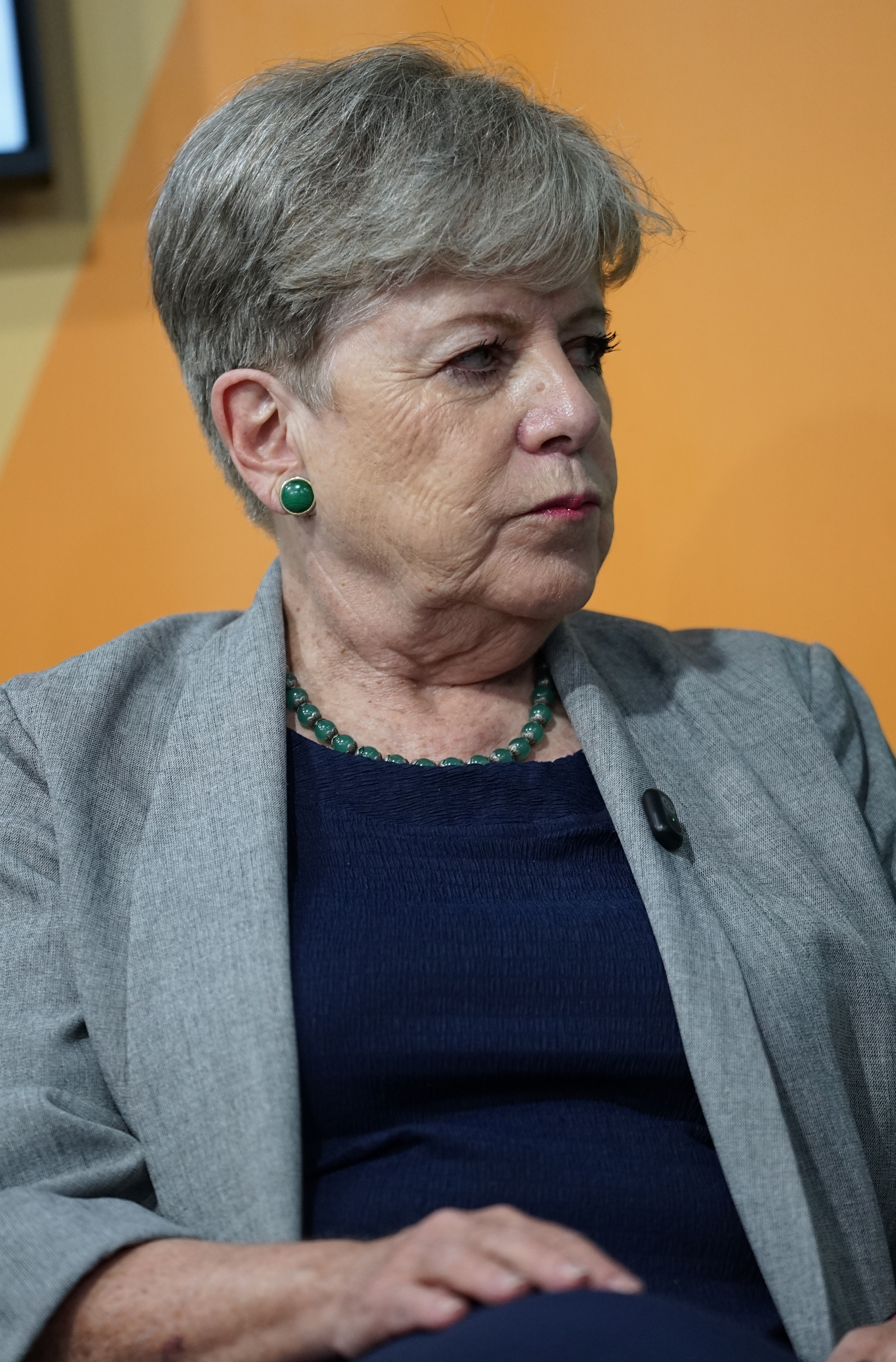
- Bárcena at COP30 in 2025

Secretary of Environment and Natural Resources
- Incumbent
- Assumed office 1 October 2024
- President: Claudia Sheinbaum
- Preceded by: María Luisa Albores

Secretary of Foreign Affairs
- In office 3 July 2023 – 1 October 2024
- President: Andrés Manuel López Obrador
- Preceded by: Marcelo Ebrard
- Succeeded by: Juan Ramón de la Fuente

Ambassador of Mexico to Chile
- In office 30 September 2022 – 30 June 2023
- President: Andrés Manuel López Obrador
- Preceded by: Francisco Olavarría Patiño
- Succeeded by: Laura Moreno Rodríguez

Executive Secretary of the United Nations Economic Commission for Latin America and the Caribbean
- In office 1 July 2008 – 31 March 2022
- Secretary-General: Ban Ki-moon; António Guterres
- Preceded by: José Luis Machinea
- Succeeded by: José Manuel Salazar-Xirinachs

Personal details
- Born: 5 March 1952 (age 74) Mexico City, Mexico
- Education: National Autonomous University of Mexico (BS); Harvard University (MPA)

Alicia Isabel Adriana Bárcena Ibarra (born 5 March 1952) is a Mexican biologist and the current Secretary of Environment and Natural Resources of Mexico. She was the Secretary of Foreign Affairs from 2023 to 2024 and previously served as the Executive Secretary of the United Nations Economic Commission for Latin America and the Caribbean (ECLAC) from July 2008 to March 2022.

== Early life and education ==
Alicia Bárcena was born on March 5, 1952, in Mexico City, to Spanish Republican parents who fled the Spanish Civil War and settled in Mexico. Bárcena holds a bachelor's degree in biology from the National Autonomous University of Mexico (UNAM) and a master's degree in public administration from Harvard University.

== Career ==
=== Early beginnings ===
Bárcena is a former undersecretary of the environment in the federal cabinet and a former director of Mexico's National Fisheries Institute (Spanish: Instituto Nacional de Pesca).

Bárcena was the Founding Director of the Earth Council in Costa Rica until 1995. The Earth Council is a non-governmental organization in charge of the follow-up of the agreements reached in the United Nations Conference on Environment and Development (UNCED) held in Rio de Janeiro, Brazil, in 1992.

Bárcena collaborated in the UNCED Secretariat as Principal Officer in charge of various topics related to Agenda 21.

Within the realm of academia, Bárcena was the Director of the South-East Regional Centre of the Instituto Nacional de Investigaciones sobre Recursos Bióticos in the state of Yucatán, working closely with the Mayan communities. She has taught and researched on natural sciences mostly on botany, ethnobotany and ecology. She has published a number of articles on sustainable development, namely on financing, public policies, environment and public participation as for example on the online magazine Impakter.

=== Career with the United Nations ===
From 1995, Bárcena acted as Coordinator of the United Nations Environment Programme (UNEP), in charge of a global programme on environmental citizenship with emphasis on the participation of civil society, as well as adviser to the Latin American and Caribbean Sustainable Development Programme in the United Nations Development Programme (UNDP).

Until 2006, Bárcena was Deputy Executive Secretary of the Economic Commission for Latin America and the Caribbean (ECLAC) earlier in her career. In this position, she has actively promoted the implementation of the Millennium Development Goals and on Financing for Sustainable Development in Latin America and the Caribbean. Within ECLAC, she also served as the Chief of the Environment and Human Settlements Division, where she focused on public policies for sustainable development with particular reference to the linkages between environment, economy and social issues.

On 3 March 2006, United Nations Secretary-General Kofi Annan announced Bárcena's appointment as Acting Chef de Cabinet in the Executive Office of the Secretary-General. Her appointment took effect on 8 December 2005 after the departure of the Deputy Secretary-General, Louise Fréchette, and Mark Malloch Brown's assumption of his new duties as Deputy Secretary-General.

On 3 January 2007, Secretary-General Ban Ki-moon appointed Bárcena as UN Under-Secretary-General for Management. Her appointment marked the first time since 1992 that this position was not been held by a U.S. citizen.

=== Economic Commission for Latin America and the Caribbean (ECLAC), 2008–2022 ===
In 2008, Ban announced Bárcena's appointment as Executive Secretary of the Economic Commission for Latin America and the Caribbean (ECLAC); she replaced José Luis Machinea. Her term concluded on 31 March 2022.

From 2014 until 2015, Bárcena served on the Secretary-General's Independent Expert Advisory Group on the Data Revolution for Sustainable Development, co-chaired by Enrico Giovannini and Robin Li. In 2016, she was appointed by Erik Solheim, the Chairman of the Organisation for Economic Co-operation and Development Development Assistance Committee, to serve on the High Level Panel on the Future of the Development Assistance Committee under the leadership of Mary Robinson. From 2016 until 2017, she co-chaired (alongside Janez Potočnik) the International Resource Panel at the United Nations Environment Programme (UNEP).

=== Return to domestic politics, 2022–2024 ===
In September 2022, Bárcena was confirmed as Mexico's ambassador to Chile.

Later that month, President Andrés Manuel López Obrador announced his plans to nominate Bárcena to succeed Mauricio Claver-Carone as head of the Inter-American Development Bank (IDB). By November 2022, Bárcena had spoken with López Obrador to withdraw her nomination "for personal reasons"; instead, López Obrador nominated Gerardo Esquivel Hernández for the position.

On 3 July 2023, Bárcena resigned her post as ambassador to Chile to take office as Secretary of Foreign Affairs, replacing Marcelo Ebrard. On 20 June 2024, president-elect Claudia Sheinbaum announced that as of October 2024, Bárcena was to serve in her cabinet as the head of the Secretariat of the Environment and Natural Resources.

== Other activities ==
- Global Partnership for Sustainable Development Data, Member of the Board of Directors (since 2017)
- University of Oslo/The Lancet Independent Panel on Global Governance for Health, Member
- World Economic Forum (WEF), Co-Chair of the Global Future Council on the Future of Regional Governance
- World Economic Forum (WEF), Member of the Global Future Council on Geopolitics (2018-2019)
- Inter-American Dialogue, Member of the Board (since 2010)

Political offices
Preceded by José Luis Machinea	Executive Secretary of the United Nations Economic Commission for Latin America and the Caribbean; 2008–2022	Succeeded by José Manuel Salazar-Xirinachs
