= Carlos Quintana =

Carlos Quintana may refer to:

- Carlos Quintana (baseball) (born 1965), Venezuelan baseball player
- Carlos Quintana (boxer) (born 1976), Puerto Rican boxer
- Carlos Quintana (footballer) (born 1988), Argentine football defender
- Carlos Quintana (engineer) (1912–1987), Mexican engineer, executive secretary of the United Nations Economic Commission for Latin America
- Carlos Quintana Martínez (born 1980), Mexican politician, represented the 10th federal electoral district of Michoacán
- Carlos Quintana (politician) (1950–2022), Argentine trade unionist and politician

== See also ==
- Carlos Morales Quintana (born 1970), Spanish architect and yachtsman, husband of Princess Alexia of Greece and Denmark
