= KOTRA =

Korean state-funded trade organization

KOTRA 코트라
- Founded: 1962 (as the Korea Trade Promotion Corporation)
- Headquarters: 13 Heolleungno, Seocho-gu, Seoul, Rep. of Korea
- Key people: Kang Kyung-sung (CEO since May 2025)
- Products: Trade-Investment Promotion
- Owner: Government of South Korea
- Website: www.kotra.or.kr

KOTRA (Korea Trade Promotion Corporation initially, Korea Trade-Investment Promotion Agency since 1995) is a state-funded trade and investment promotion organization operated by the Government of South Korea. KOTRA was established in 1962 as a national trade promotion organization. Since then, it has facilitated Korea's rapid export-led economic development through various trade promotion activities such as overseas market surveys, SME export promotion, trade info services, government-to-gov't export, foreign investment in Korea (FDI) promotion and business matchmaking.

== Activities ==
In August 1995, cross-border investment promotion and support for technological and industrial cooperation projects were added to KOTRA's mandate, and it was renamed the Korea Trade-Investment Promotion Agency under the Ministry of Trade, Industry and Energy (MOTIE).

KOTRA currently operates Invest KOREA, the national investment promotion agency. Originally initiated as the Korea Investment Service Center (KISC) in 1998, the agency was relaunched as Invest KOREA in November 2003 to support foreign investors with an expanded range of services.

To take advantage of the era of E-Commerce, KOTRA launched the interactive internet portal sites of Invest KOREA Online (formerly Cyber KISC) in 2003 and BuyKorea in 2004.

KOTRA Academy was launched in 2003 as a professional learning center for international business.

KOTRA has an extensive worldwide network of overseas Korea Trade Centers (KTC). As of November 28, 2020, KOTRA has a network of 127 offices in 84 countries worldwide with 10 of the regional headquarters.

=== KOTRA Seal of Excellence ===
KOTRA Seal of Excellence

The KOTRA Seal of Excellence is a seal that KOTRA gives to companies which it deems qualified according to three major criteria. These are: Quality, High Technology, and Trustworthiness. As of June 2010, KOTRA has awarded the seal to 430 different companies. The purpose of the seal is to help foreign companies to identify quality products and companies in Korea.
