= Quintana Olleros =

Spanish artist (1851–1919)

Quintana Olleras
- Born: Blas Olleros y Quintana; 1851; Ávila, Spain
- Died: 1919 (aged 67–68); Florence, Italy
- Known for: Watercolourist
- Movement: Orientalist themes

Blas Olleros y Quintana (1851 Avila, Spain − 1919 Florence, Italy) (alternative names: Olleros Quintana, Quintana Olleros, Bias Olleros y Quintana) was a Spanish figure painter and landscape painter who worked primarily in Italy as a watercolorist. He is best known for his Neapolitan scenes and Orientalist works.

== Life and career ==
Blas Olleros was born in Piedrahita, in the Province of Ávila in central-Western Spain (approximately 60 km south of Salamanca and 200 km from Madrid) in 1851. In 1874, the Ávila City Council awarded a grant to Olleros enabling him to further his art education in Rome. In his first year in Rome, he completed the work, Nerón En un Jardin Recitando Rodeado de su Corte [Nero in a Garden Setting, Surrounded by his Court]. After completing his studies, he relocated to Paris for three years. During this period, he became acquainted with the Spanish portrait and genre painter Palmaroli who influenced Olleros’ work.

In 1881, he returned to Rome, where he met the Spanish painter Agustin Salinas and the pair became great friends. For much of the 1880s, Olleros resided in Naples, where he was known as “Il Improvvisatore” [The Improviser]. He adopted Italy as his new homeland, remaining there for most of his adult life.

In 1883, he sold two works, Una Pompeyana ("A Pompeii woman") and Una Marina ("Seascape"), through Hernández in Madrid, a commercial gallery that specialised in the sale of watercolours. After that his work was sold primarily through Hernández, although some works were also sold through foreign dealers notably German and French agents.

In his later years, he resided in Florence and died there in 1919.

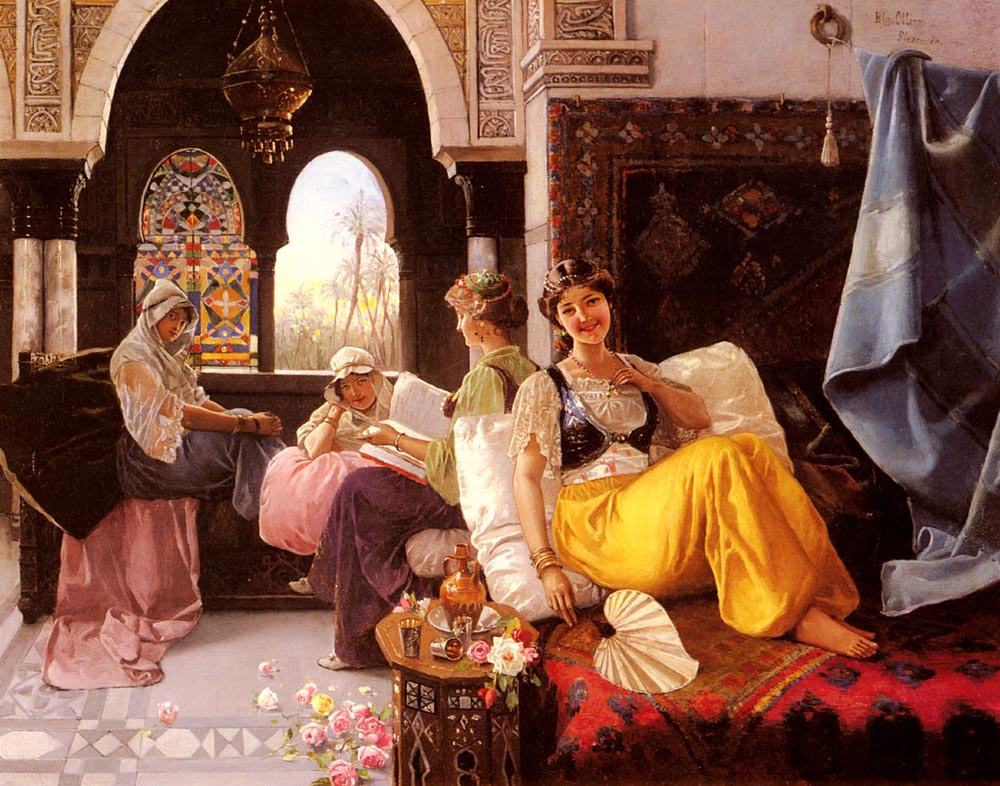
Harem Scene, 1915

== Work ==
His subject matter was varied and included landscapes, seascapes, figures, genre and historical scenes. A great deal of his work focused on Neapolitan scenery, especially harbour scenes. He worked in oil and watercolour and typically signed his works "Blas Olleros". His most well-known painting is Harem Scene (pictured) has been reproduced in many texts.

=== Gallery ===
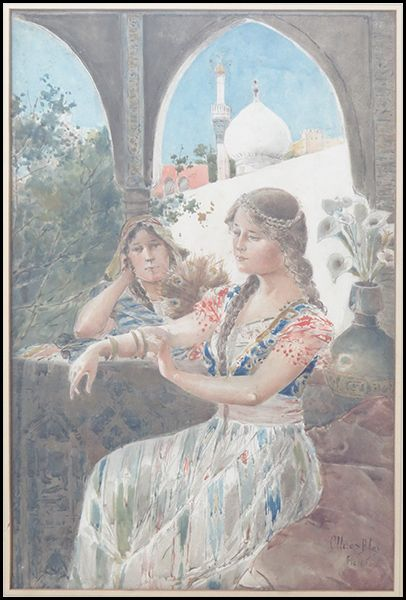
Italian women adorned

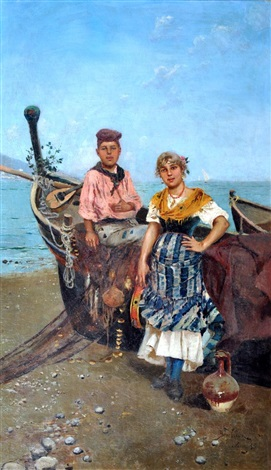
Children on a boat aground

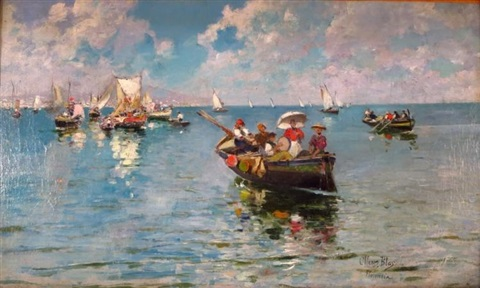
Festive Italian Fishing Boats

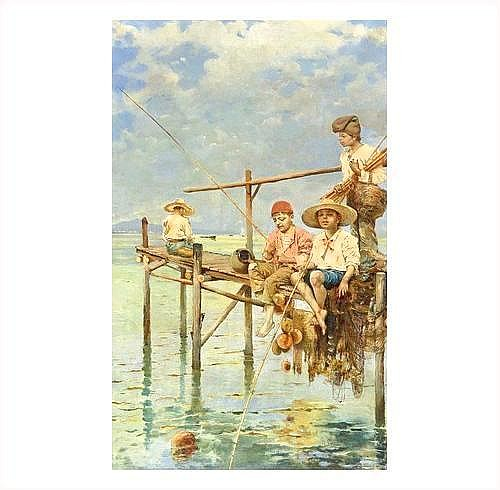
Little Fishermen

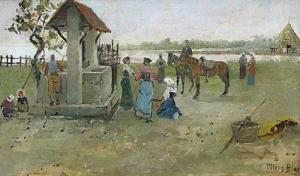
Roman Countryside

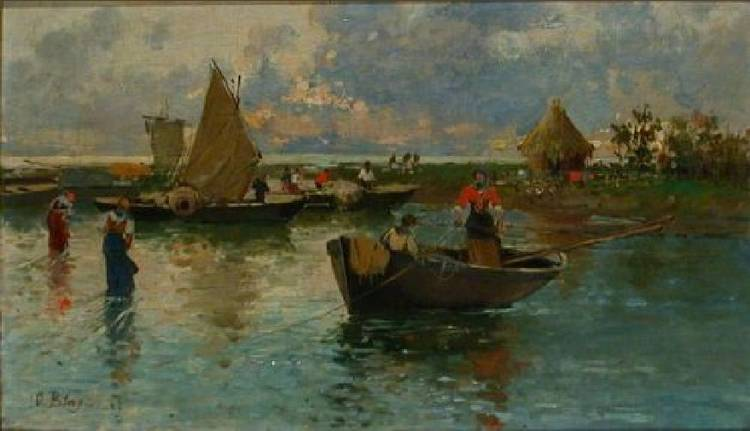
Marina

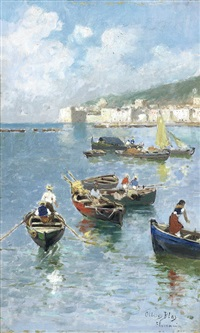
Rowing boats off the coast

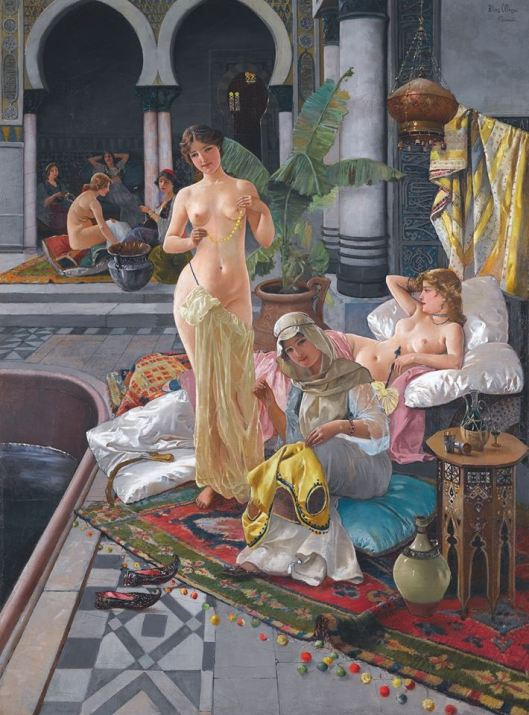
In a Persian Bath

== See also ==
- List of Orientalist artists
- List of Spanish artists
- Orientalism
- List of people from Ávila, Spain
