= International Economic Development Council =

- Abbreviation: IEDC
- Formation: May 2001
- Type: Non-profit
- Headquarters: Washington, D.C., United States
- Members: 4,500
- President and CEO: Nathan Ohle
- Website: www.iedconline.org

The International Economic Development Council (IEDC) is a non-profit membership organization serving economic developers. With more than 4,500 members, IEDC is the largest national and global organization of its kind.

IEDC is located in Washington, D.C., and is governed by a board of directors and by the president and CEO, currently Nathan Ohle. As a 501(c)(3) nonprofit organization, IEDC is legally barred from endorsing political candidates and may only engage in limited lobbying activities.

IEDC's strategic directives include the core topics of globalization, sustainability, entrepreneurship, and economic restructuring. IEDC works with communities and economic development organizations to weave these core topics into pertinent economic development projects, such as community revitalization, business development, and job creation nationwide and abroad.

== Background ==
The IEDC was created as a result of a merger between the Council of Urban Economic Development (CUED) and the American Economic Development Council (AEDC) in May 2001. Both AEDC and CUED were organizations that were formed as a result of efforts by businessmen and civic leaders. Founders came from the railroad utilities, and the public and private sectors. Despite their diverse backgrounds and professional experiences, founders of each organization shared a common passion to develop their cities and communities into vibrant places to live and do business.

The AEDC had been operating in various forms since 1926 with focus on industrial development. AEDC had been linked to the Economic Development Institute (EDI) since the early 1960s, with the focus on training and development for economic development as a profession. Notably, AEDC's education initiatives developed professionalism in the field, fostered the sharing of best practices among economic developers and cultivated an expertise among those in the profession. AEDC members offered their services around the world in order to encourage the use of common economic development tools internationally. AEDC traditionally had a high representation of members from the American South, and a large contingent of Canadian members that concentrated on forging ties with the private sector.

The CUED originated as "Helping Urban Business", or the HUB Council, in 1966. It changed its name to CUED in 1974. The founding of the CUED followed the civil disturbances/urban riots in Watts in Los Angeles and other cities like Detroit, Newark and Washington. These disturbances further weakened the position of many urban economies, as manufacturing and commercial businesses increased their exodus to the suburbs and outer transportation corridors. The CUED's primary objective was to develop an urban policy for economic development. In 1968, the Economic Development Administration (EDA) provided the CUED with a grant for technical assistance, information, and research. From its early days, CUED established itself as a go-to organization for research and technical assistance on federal programs like the Community Development Block Grant (CDBG) Program and the UDAG Program and played an important role in helping to develop strong economic development policies.

== Members ==
As the world's largest membership organization serving the economic development profession, IEDC members represent the entire range of economic development experience. Members come from the public and private sectors and rural and urban areas throughout the globe. IEDC members promote economic development through the auspices of local, state, provincial and federal governments, public-private partnerships, chambers of commerce, universities and a variety of other institutions. Members include:

- Regional, state, county, and city economic development organizations
- Chambers of commerce and other business support agencies
- Community and neighborhood development organizations
- Technology development agencies
- Utility companies
- Educational institutions
- Consultants
- Redevelopment authorities

== Programs and services ==
IEDC additionally provides professional development services, offering 25 courses each year in over 30 states and online, educating its network of 1,200 Certified Economic Developers (CEcDs) and other practitioners, and certifying Economic Development Organizations (EDOs) through its accreditation program (AEDO). IEDC serves as a voice for the profession on issues such as:

- Workforce development
- Infrastructure and business finance
- Business marketing, attraction, expansion, and retention
- Community development
- Industrial rehabilitation and location
- International trade
- Tourism development

=== Professional training ===
IEDC training courses include:

- Business Retention & Expansion
- Economic Development Credit Analysis
- Economic Development Finance Programs
- Economic Development Marketing & Attraction
- Economic Development Strategic Planning
- Entrepreneurial and Small Business Development Strategies
- Introduction to Economic Development
- Managing Economic Development Organizations
- Neighborhood Development Strategies
- Real Estate Development & Reuse
- Technology-Led Economic Development
- Workforce Development

=== Certification ===
The Certified Economic Developers (CEcD) is an industry designation.

=== Accreditation ===
IEDC accredits economic development organizations through the Accredited Economic Development Organization program.

=== Conferences ===
IEDC organizes four conferences a year, which include an annual conference, a technical conference, legislative conference, and a leadership conference.

=== Legislative affairs ===
Each year, IEDC examines notable federal events and legislation in economic development, reviews appropriations for a number of key federal programs, and previews the budget for the upcoming fiscal year in its annual Federal Review. The department also publishes relevant policy papers and issues a Federal Leadership Economic Development Award that recognizes an individual whose commitment to economic development enhances the industry as a whole.

=== Advisory services and research ===
IEDC has two research arms:

The Advisory Services and Research Department (ASR) works directly with local communities and Federal agencies to provide peer-review technical assistance and practice-oriented research on a variety of economic development topic areas. The department focuses on important matters that impact communities and the profession, enabling practitioners to better compete in today's global economy. ASR services focus on:

- Strategic Planning
- Organizational Development & Program Analysis
- Real Estate Development & Reuse
- Business Retention, Expansion & Attraction
- Neighborhood Development & Revitalization
- Research Publications & Policy Analysis
- Technology-led Economic Development

The Economic Development Research Partnerships Program (EDRP) is a think-tank that operates under the IEDC banner, which directs research that will benefit the economic development profession as whole.

EDRP research is not being done anywhere else and EDRP members choose what areas of research to fund and how those topics will be addressed. Some issues examined have included:

- Seeking new ways to capitalize on foreign markets
- Integrating regional businesses into the global economy
- New realities for economic development organizations
- Capitalizing on new technologies, networks and software
- Strategies to support growth-oriented companies
- Responding to population and demographic changes
- Preparing for risk and unforeseen challenges

=== Other services ===
IEDC offers several webinars each year on pertinent economic development topics; publishes a bi-monthly online newsletter, Economic Development Now; provides members with quarterly copies of the Economic Development Journal; maintains the Clearinghouse Information Research; and provides members with full benefits of the GrantStation Premium Access Program (GPA).

== International partners ==
IEDC partners with international organizations promoting an international exchange of information, experience, and best practice among economic development practitioners and organizations. These efforts include partnering on initiatives, sharing information, and participating in each other's events in order to improve the integration of economic, social, and environmental agendas across national borders. These partner organizations include:

- European Union Association of Regional Development Agencies (EURADA)
- World Association of Investment Promotion Agencies (WAIPA)
- Economic Development Association of New Zealand (EDANZ)
- International Association of Science Parks (IASP)
- The LEED Program of the Organisation of Economic Co-operation and Development (OECD)
- Economic Developers Council of Ontario, Canada (EDCO)
- Economic Development Australia (EDA)

The alliances between U.S. economic development organizations and peers elsewhere in the world support international trade and investment for communities, companies and entrepreneurs internationally.

== See also ==
- Economic development organization
