= Accredited Economic Development Organization =

The Accredited Economic Development Organization (AEDO) program was created by the International Economic Development Council (IEDC), based in Washington, D.C. "to meet the needs of economic developers."

IEDC is a non-profit organization dedicated to helping economic developers do their job more effectively and raising the profile of the profession. IEDC membership represents the entire range of the profession ranging from regional, state, local, rural, urban, and international economic development organizations, as well as chambers of commerce, technology development agencies, utility companies, educational institutions, consultants and redevelopment authorities.

== History ==
Economic development has evolved into a professional industry of highly specialized practitioners. These practitioners have two key roles: one is to provide leadership in policy-making, and the other is to administer policy, programs, and projects. Economic development practitioners generally work in public offices on the state, regional, or municipal level, or in public-private partnerships organizations that are may be partially funded by local, regional, state or federal tax money. These economic development organizations (EDOs) function as individual entities and in some cases as departments of local governments. Their role is to seek out new economic opportunities and retain their existing business wealth.

== Goals ==
The goals of the AEDO Program are:

1. To assist economic development organizations with independent, authoritative feedback on their operation, structure and procedures as a means of improving programs and enhancing business and community support;
2. To recognize excellence in local economic development organizations and to heighten the visibility of the economic development process in the community; and
3. To recognize the vital contribution made by the organization's leader/manager to the economic development process.

== The accreditation process ==
Organizations receive critical evaluation and peer mentoring by certified professionals concerning internal and external operations.

The accreditation process consists of two phases, designed to elicit specific information about the structure, organization, funding, programs, and staff of the candidate economic development organization.

=== Phases leading to accreditation ===
The first phase of accreditation involves the submission of documents demonstrating the organization's development, structure, and activity to IEDC. The document review process helps to determine if the organization is eligible for accreditation and deserving of a site team visit.

The second phase involves a visit by experienced economic developers and is designed to assess the organization in action. Members of the AEDO Advisory Committee and/or Certified Economic Developers (CEcDs) conduct the visit.

IEDC's Certified Economic Developers are recognized around the world as having achieved a level of excellence in their understanding of the tools and programs of economic development.

AEDO status signifies a distinguished achievement for an economic development organization.
