= Quintana (Madrid Metro) =

Madrid Metro station

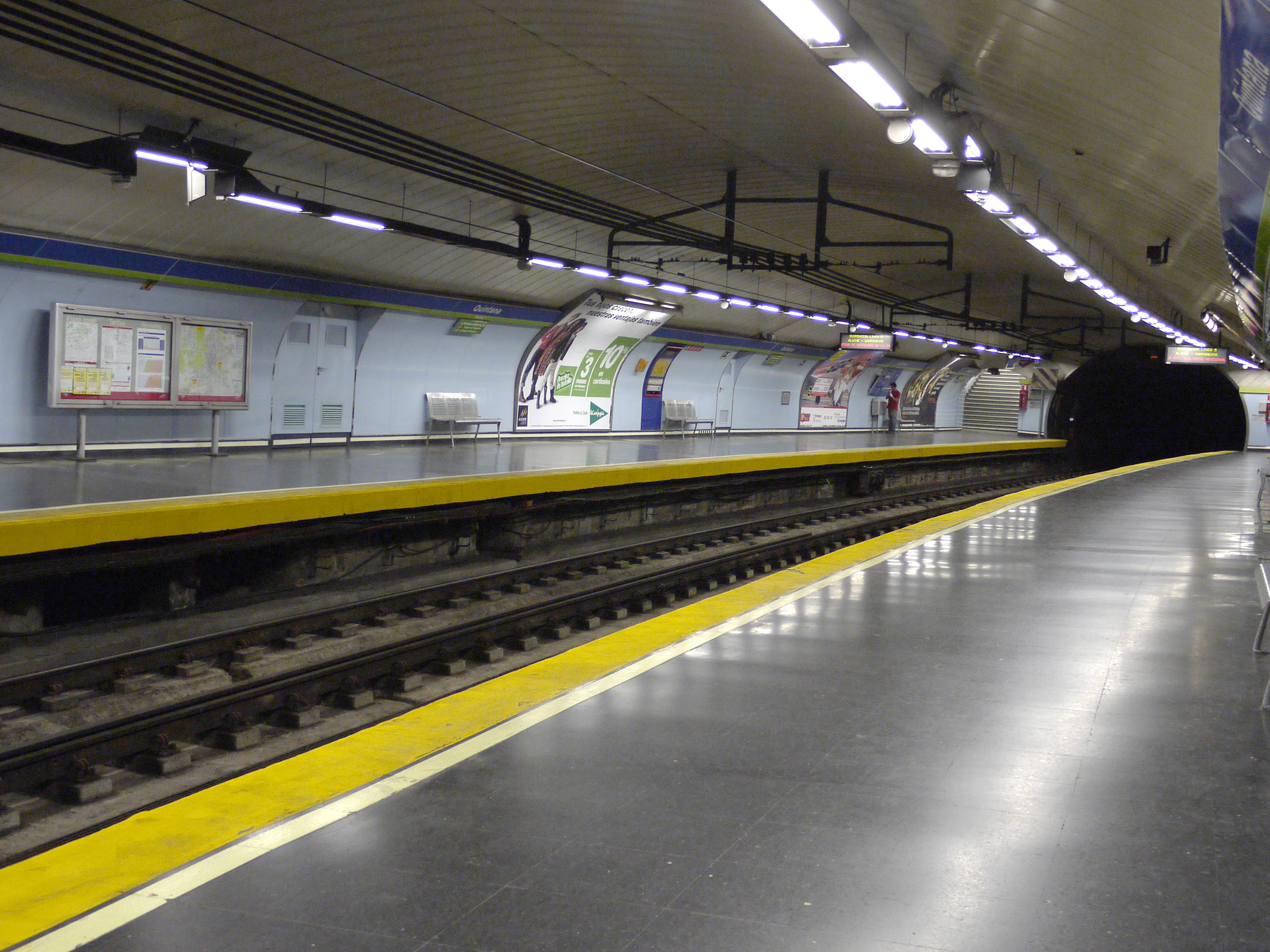

General information
- Location: Ciudad Lineal, Madrid; Spain
- Coordinates: 40.4335811°N 3.647359°W
- System: Madrid Metro station
- Owner: CRTM
- Operator: CRTM

Construction
- Accessible: No

Other information
- Fare zone: A

History
- Opened: 28 May 1964

Services
Preceding station	Madrid Metro	Following station
Pueblo Nuevo towards Alameda de Osuna	Line 5	El Carmen towards Casa de Campo
Location
- Location within Madrid

Quintana (Spanish: [kinˈtana]) is a station on Line 5 of the Madrid Metro, located under the Plaza de Quintana ("Farmhouse Place"). It is located in fare Zone A.
