= Gerardo Trejos Salas =

Costa Rican politician

Gerardo Trejos Salas (August 19, 1946– April 17, 2012) was a Costa Rican politician.
