= World Association of Investment Promotion Agencies =

Non governmental association of global investment promotion agencies

- Abbreviation: WAIPA
- Formation: 1995; 31 years ago
- Founder: UN Trade and Development and 50 investment promotion agencies
- Type: Non-governmental organization
- Legal status: Non-profit association (Under Swiss law)
- Purpose: Gather and connect worldwide investment promotion agencies
- Location: Geneva, Switzerland
- Region served: Worldwide
- Services: Represent members, coordinate events and advice on policy and strategy
- Fields: Investment
- Members: 133 (2024)
- Official language: English
- Executive Director: İsmail Erşahin
- Funding: Membership fees
- Website: waipa.org

The World Association of Investment Promotion Agencies (WAIPA) is an international non-governmental trade association in for Investment Promotion Agencies (IPAs). WAIPA acts as a forum for investment promotion agencies (IPA), provides networking and promotes best practice in investment promotion. It holds the annual World Investment Conference (WIC) each year.

== History ==
It was established in 1995 by the United Nations Conference on Trade and Development. The Secretariat has been based in Geneva, Switzerland since 1995. The World Investment Conference is held in a different location around the world each year.

== Objectives ==
The objectives of WAIPA, as reflected in the Association's Statutes, are to:

- Promote and develop understanding and cooperation amongst IPAs;
- Strengthen information gathering systems, promote the efficient use of information and facilitate access to data sources;
- Share country and regional experiences in attracting foreign investment and enhancing outward investments;
- Assist IPAs to advocate the promotion of policies, within their government, which are beneficial to increasing foreign direct investment and promoting economic development;
- Facilitate access to technical assistance and promote training of IPAs.

WAIPA further associates with two NGOs : The International Chamber of Commerce (ICC) and International Economic Development Council (IEDC). Its membership covers approximately 170 entities and represents roughly 130 countries.

== See also ==
- Investment promotion agency
