= Investment promotion agency =

Business/Government Body

An investment promotion agency (IPA) is most often a government agency (or occasionally a non-profit organization functioning similar to a chamber of commerce or business consulting corporation) whose mission is to attract investment to a country, state, region or city. They do this through the use of marketing activities by creating awareness about a location as an attractive destination for investment. Generally, IPAs have four core functions: image building of FDI hosting country, investment generation, project management and aftercare services. While IPAs play an important role in attracting investment to developed countries some IPAs have additional advocacy function.

The IPA does this by introducing investors with local suppliers (raw materials or other inputs); providing useful statistical data and business information such as macroeconomic indicators (GNP, GDP, HDI, inflation etc.), labor productivity, average wages, attractive sectors of domestic economy; practical support like securing permits or completing other administrative obligations; and by managing any investment incentives that the city, state or country may offer to foreign investors (companies or individuals).

== See also ==
- Foreign direct investment
- World Association of Investment Promotion Agencies
