= ICC Working Group on Business and Human Rights =

The ICC Working Group on Business and Human Rights is a thematic Working Group of the International Coordinating Committee of National Institutions for the Promotion and Protection of Human Rights (ICC). The Working Group was established by the ICC Bureau in March 2009 and held its first meeting in Copenhagen in August 2009. The Working Group includes 2 members from each of the 4 ICC Regions (Africa, Americas, Asia-Pacific and Europe). The Danish Institute for Human Rights (DIHR) currently holds the Chair of the Working Group.

The Working Group on Business and Human Rights is the first thematic working group under the ICC. The purpose of the Working Group is to encourage collaboration between National Human Rights Institutions (NHRIs) within the Human Rights and Business field and ensure that the issue of human rights and business is included in international frameworks.

== Organization ==
The officers of the WG are a Chair and Vice Chair. The order of succession of the offices of Chair and Vice Chair is distributed between the four ICC regions in the following order: Europe, Americas, Asia Pacific, and Africa. Each ICC Regional Chair determines the method of selection of members representing the four ICC regions. Membership of the Working Group for regional members lasts for a period of two years. If a membership of the Working Group is terminated, the relevant Regional Chair determines a replacement.
The working languages of the Working Group will be those of the ICC: English, French and Spanish.

== Links to meeting documents ==
- NHRI Roundtable, Copenhagen 2008
- Working Group Steering Committee, Nairobi 2008
- Establishment of the Working Group on Business and Human Rights, Morocco 2009
- The first meeting of the Working Group, Copenhagen 2009
- 10th International Conference of NHRIs on "Business and Human Rights", Edinburgh 2010

== See also ==
- Coordinating Committee of National Human Rights Institutions
- Human Rights
- International human rights instruments
- List of human rights organizations
- National human rights institutions
- Office of the United Nations High Commissioner for Human Rights
- Paris Principles
- United Nations Commission on Human Rights
- United Nations Human Rights Council
