= European Network of National Human Rights Institutions =

The European Network of National Human Rights Institutions (ENNHRI) is a membership international not-for-profit association (AISBL) under Belgian law. In 2013 it established its Permanent Secretariat in Brussels bringing together National Human Rights Institutions (NHRIs) from across the wider European region. Formerly known as European Group of National Human Rights Institutions (European Group of NHRIs, the Group), ENNHRI has been actively working in the field of promotion and protection of human rights in wider Europe for 15 years. ENNHRI essentially assists in the establishment and accreditation of European NHRIs, coordinates the exchange of information and best practices among its members, facilitates capacity building and training, engages with international and regional mechanisms for protection and promotion of human right and intervenes on legal and policy developments in Europe.

ENNHRI is one of four regional networks within the Global Alliance of National Human Rights Institutions (GANHRI), supported by the Office of the United Nations High Commissioner for Human Rights (OHCHR). The other three groups are: Network of African National Human Rights Institutions, Network of National Institutions in the Americas and Asia Pacific Forum.

== History ==
The ICC (now GANHRI), or as often referred to, the global network of NHRIs was established in 1993. The NHRIs of the European region, however, first met in 1994 under the auspices of the Council of Europe in Strasbourg. The following meeting took place in Copenhagen, where the European Coordinating Group was set up in order to enhance the cooperation with OHCHR, the Council of Europe and Organization for Security and Co-operation in Europe/Office for Democratic Institutions and Human Rights (OSCE/ODIHR). A third meeting was, consequently held in context of roundtable with Council of Europe in 2000 in Strasbourg. The turning point for the formalisation of the European Group of National Human Rights Institutions, was its fourth meeting in Dublin where the members approved the Group's Rules of Procedure and agreed to meet annually in the margins of ICC Annual meeting in Geneva, Switzerland. The European Group of NHRIs aspired to establish a Permanent Secretariat for many years. After receiving a start-up grant form UN OHCHR in 2013, the European Group of NHRIs recruited a Secretary General to establish a Permanent Secretariat in Brussels. In May 2013 the Group, agreed on the constitution and changed the name to the European Network of National Human Rights Institutions (ENNHRI). The constitution became formal as ENNHRI's statutes on incorporation later that year as an International Not-for-profit Association (AISBL) under Belgian law. ENNHRI Strategic planning meeting supported by OSCE-ODIHR with the participation of majority members took place in November 2013 in Budapest, Hungary. The outcomes of the meeting, ENNHRI's Strategic Plan 2014-16 and Operational Plan 2014 were afterwards formally endorsed by ENNHRI General Assembly in March 2014.

== Values ==
ENNHRI's values are:

Respect of international human rights standards;

• Transparency;

• Cooperation;

• Accountability;

• Participation;

• Non-discrimination; and

• Independence.

== Vision ==
For the period 2014–16, ENNHRI's vision is: "Universal and effective enjoyment of human rights throughout Europe."

== Mission ==
For the period 2014–16, ENNHRI's mission is: "Supporting and strengthening European NHRIs to protect and promote human rights effectively, in line with the Paris Principles."

== Members ==
Albania Avokati Popullit (People's Advocate) A

Armenia Human Rights Defender of Armenia A

Austria Volksanwaltschaft (Austrian Ombudsman Board) B

Azerbaijan Human Rights Commissioner A

Belgium Interfederal Centre for Equal Opportunities and Opposition to Discrimination and Racism B

Belgium Federal Migration Centre B

Bosnia and Herzegovina Institution of Human Rights Ombudsmen of Bosnia and Herzegovina A

Bulgaria The Ombudsman of the Republic of Bulgaria B

Croatia Ombudsman of the Republic of Croatia A

Denmark Danish Institute for Human Rights A

Finland National Human Rights Institution in Finland: Human Rights Centre and the Parliamentary Ombudsman A

France Commission Nationale Consultative des Droits de l'Homme (CNCDH) A

Georgia Office of Public Defender (Ombudsman) of Georgia A

Germany Deutsches Institut für Menschenrechte (German Institute for Human Rights)A

Great Britain Equality and Human Rights Commission A

Greece Greek National Commission for Human Rights A

Hungary Office of the Commissioner for Fundamental Rights A

Ireland Irish Human Rights Commission A

Kosovo Ombudsperson Institution of Kosovo None

Latvia Ombudsman's Office of the Republic of Latvia None

Lithuania The Seimas Ombudsmen's Office of the Republic of Lithuania None

Luxembourg Commission Consultative des Droits de L'homme du Grand-Duché de Luxembourg A

Macedonia Ombudsman Institution of the Republic of Macedonia B

Netherlands Netherlands Institute for Human Rights A

Northern Ireland Northern Ireland Human Rights Commission A

Norway National Human Rights Institution (Norwegian Centre for Human Rights) B

Poland Human Rights Defender A

Portugal Provedor de Justicia A

Romania Romanian Institute for Human Rights C

Scotland Scottish Human Rights Commission A

Serbia The Protector of Citizens of the Republic of Serbia A

Slovakia Slovenske narodne stredisko pre ludske prava (Slovak National Centre for Human Rights) B

Slovenia Varuh Clovekovih Pravic RS (Human Rights Ombudsman) B

Spain El Defensor del Pueblo (DPS) A

Sweden The Equality Ombudsman B

Ukraine Office of the Ukrainian Parliament Commissioner for Human Rights A

Turkey National Human Rights Institution of Turkey None

== Organisation Structure ==
=== Membership ===
ENNHRI is composed of NHRIs from wider Europe. 'A' status European NHRIs are voting members of ENNHRI and can actively participate in the European Coordinating Committee (ECC). NHRIs that are accredited with 'B' status by the SCA are non-voting members. Such NHRIs must commit themselves to take up active steps towards 'A' status of accreditation. Meanwhile, as 'B' status institutions they can take part in the Finance Committee and act as Working Groups' Chairs. The European NHRIs which are not 'A' nor 'B' status accredited, have a possibility to become associate members, by all means, without voting rights. Such associate members have an obligation, though, to commit, in an acceptable form, to take active steps towards 'A' status accreditation. Thus, they can participate in the Finance Committee and Working Groups. It is equally applicable to all NHRIs of ENNHRI that in order to remain members they must comply with ENNHRI statutes, submit the annual membership fee payment and act in accordance with ENNHRIs' objectives.

=== Governance ===
==== ENNHRI's General Assembly (GA) ====
GA is the highest decision-making body consisting of all voting members. ENNHRI members without voting rights may, however speak during the meetings. The GA decides generally takes decisions on the basis of consensus.

==== The European Coordinating Committee (ECC) ====
ECC is responsible for ENNHRI's management and administration. It is composed of minimum of four and maximum of six A-accredited European NHRIs.

==== The Chair of ECC ====
The chair is elected by the ENNHRI GA and supervises the management of ENNHRI's day-to-day activities and he /she primary representative of ENNHRI.

==== The Permanent Secretariat ====
The ENNHRI Secretariat in Brussels is responsible for daily administrative and operational activities of ENNHRI. It facilitates work between ENNHRI's governmental structures and members.

== Activities ==
=== Working Groups ===
ENNHRI has established numerous forms of cooperation, including working groups or thematic clusters. These are composed and led by ENNHRI members, and partially supported by ENNHRI Secretariat.

==== Legal Working Group ====
The Legal WG gathers ENNHRI members' legal experts and officers which are presided by a chair. The Group has worked on issues of enhancing European fundamental and human rights regimes. This included the implementation of the European Convention on Human Rights and execution of judgments from the European Court of Human Rights (ECtHR), the EU accession to the European Convention of Human Rights and implementation of the EU Charter of Fundamental Rights. Through the Legal WG, ENNHRI enjoys observer status at the Steering Committee for Human Rights (CDDH) Council of Europe and its subordinate bodies.

==== Asylum and Migration Working Group ====
The Asylum and Migration Working Group (A&M WG) was officially set up in January 2007. The issue of detention of the asylum seekers and irregular migrants in Europe was discussed during its resurrection meeting in December 2013. The statement produced during this meeting was presented in September 2014 during the first Council of Europe, European Union Agency for Fundamental Rights and Equinet Platform meeting on Asylum and Migration. The group has been carefully following the situation of migrants and refugees in Mediterranean Sea since the Lampedusa tragedy and addressed this issue through statements including latest from April 2015. Other topics addressed by the A&M WG include calling upon the EU Institutions to take urgent action regarding the Syrian refugee crisis, in particular the immediate application of the EU Directive on Temporary Protection and a statement on statelessness to the Human Rights Commissioner of Council of Europe during the Global Forum on Statelessness in September 2014.

==== Convention on the Rights of Persons with Disabilities (CRPD) Working Group ====
The CRPD Working Group (CRPD WG) was set up in 2010 and it is composed of European NHRIs that act as an independent mechanism under article 33.2 of the UN Convention on the Rights of Persons with Disabilities (UNCRPD). CRPD WG has been engaging with other relevant stakeholders in the field of rights of disabilities such as the UN Committee on Rights of Persons with Disabilities which wish to include NHRIs into development of General Comment on article 33.2. Moreover, CRPD WG participated in the annual European Commission Work Forum on UNCRPD in 2014. The CRPD WG met twice in 2014 and discussed article 33.2 monitoring activities of the members, updates on situation in the field of rights of persons with disabilities in EU, Council of Europe and UN and reviewed disability case law of the ECtHR and Court of Justice of the European Union (CJEU). The CRPD WG focuses on issues of forced treatment and deprivation of liberty in respect of person with psycho-social disabilities and in 2014 submitted comments on the Additional Protocol to the Oviedo Convention relating to the 'protection of the human rights and dignity of persons with mental disorders with regard to involuntary placement and treatment'.

=== Projects ===
==== NHRI Academy ====
The NHRI Academy is a joint project between ENNHRI and OSCE-ODIHR. The inaugural Academy took place in 2014 in Budapest, Hungary in cooperation with Central European University and the second NHRI Academy took place in Warsaw, Poland. The NHRI Academy brings together mid-level and senior staff from NHRIs from across the wider European region. The NHRI Academy addresses aspects of NHRI characteristics and methodologies, such as gender mainstreaming, cooperation and independence of NHRIs, Human Rights Monitoring and engaging with Council of Europe. The NHRI Academy also constitutes a platform for capacity building of NHRIs' staff members, for sharing good practices and provides possibilities for networking.

==== Older Persons Project ====
ENNHRI is supported by the European Commission (Directorate-General Employment, Social Affairs and Inclusion - Social Protection Unit) to embed a human rights-based approach in the care of older persons in Europe through the project "Human Rights of Older Persons and Long-term Care". This project started in January 2015 and aims to improve the human rights protection of older persons in long-term care, with particular emphasis on residential care. The project will run for 2.5 years and will involve the monitoring of the human rights situation of older persons in long-term care in the jurisdictions of six ENNHRI members (Belgium, Croatia, Germany, Hungary, Lithuania and Romania). Preparation for the project included an ENNHRI member survey on activities conducted with regard to rights of older persons, planning meetings and a major stakeholder conference which took place in Brussels in October 2014.

== See also ==
- National Human Rights Institutions
- International Co-ordinating Committee of National Human Rights Institutions
- Asia Pacific Forum of National Human Rights Institutions (APF)
- Network of National Institutions in the Americas
- Network of African National Human Rights Institutions (NANHRI)
