= Ombudsman services by country =

An ombudsman is a government official who investigates and helps resolve conflicts by recommendation or mediation. They are typically appointed by a government body of their respective country.

== Albania ==
The People's Advocate (ombudsman) of the Republic of Albania (Albanian: Avokati i Popullit) was envisaged in Chapter VI of the Albanian Constitution approved in November 1998 (Articles 60–63 and 134). Article 60 states that "The People's Advocate defends the rights, freedoms and lawful interests of individuals from unlawful or improper actions or failures to act of the organs of public administration". The Parliament passed the Law on the People's Advocate, Law No. 8454, in February 1999. The People's Advocate is elected by three-fifths of all Assembly members for a five-year term, with the right to reelection. The law has since been amended by Law No. 8600, of 10 April 2000, and Law No. 9398, of 12 May 2005.

The current Ombudsman is Erinda Ballanca (elected on 22 May 2017) succeeding Igli Totozani (elected on 23 December 2011) and Dr Emir Dobjani, who had served since February 2000.

== Andorra ==
In the Principality of Andorra, the ombudsman is called Raonador del Ciutadà.

== Argentina ==
The Defensor del Pueblo de la Nación Argentina (The People's Defender of The Nation of Argentina), established in Article 86 of the Constitution, is an independent body related to the Argentine National Congress with functional autonomy, as it does not receive instructions from any authority and enjoys the same privileges of a legislator.

The principal functions are the defense of human rights and other rights, guarantees, and interests protected by the Constitution, to acts or omissions of public administration and also the control of public administrative functions.

By law, the Defender should be elected by the vote of 2/3 of the members present in each branch of Congress for a period of five years and may be reappointed. The position is currently vacant, having no replacement for Eduardo René Mondino, whose term ended in 2008

== Armenia ==
The office of the Human Rights Defender, or Ombudsman, of Armenia was created through legislation in October 2003. The Human Rights Defender describes the goal of the office as the protection and restoration of human rights and fundamental freedoms. It also receives citizen complaints against state and local officials.

In February 2004, Larisa Alaverdyan was appointed to the office by presidential decree. The second ombudsman was Armen Harutyunyan, who was elected by the National Assembly under article 83.1 of the Constitution on 17 February 2006, obtaining more than 3/5 votes of deputies. Karen Andreasyan was the third Human Rights Defender of Armenia. On 2 March 2011, the National Assembly elected the new Ombudsman, with 83 parliamentarians voting for and 13 against. Karen Andreasyan assumed the responsibilities of Human Rights Defender of Armenia on 3 March 2011. The fourth Ombudsman, Arman Tatoyan, was elected by the National Assembly in February 2016. Tatoyan was the former Deputy Minister of Justice. Since 24 January 2022, Kristinne Grigoryan was elected as the fifth Human Rights Defender of Armenia by the National Assembly.

== Australia ==
The first ombudsman position created in Australia was the Western Australian Ombudsman in 1971, followed shortly by the South Australian Ombudsman in 1972 and the Victorian Ombudsman in 1973. The Commonwealth Ombudsman in Australia was established in 1976.

Ombudsman can investigate complaints about the actions and decisions of Australian Government departments, agencies, and services delivered by private contractors and oversee complaint investigations conducted by the Australian Federal Police.

== Austria ==
The three-member Ombudsman Board (German: Volksanwaltschaft, literally "People's Advocacy") was created in 1977 as an independent authority monitoring Austria's entire public administration. It checks the legality of decisions by authorities and examines possible cases of maladministration. The members are appointed by parliament for six-year terms.

There are also children's ombudsman offices.

== Azerbaijan ==
The Commissioner for Human Rights (Ombudsman) of the Republic of Azerbaijan is also the country's national human rights institution, initially accredited with A status by the International Co-ordinating Committee of NHRIs. GANHRI downgraded it to B status in May 2018.

The first ombudsman, Elmira Süleymanova, was elected by the Parliament on 2 July 2002, and was reappointed in 2010 for a second term. Suleymanova (born 1937), formerly a professor of chemistry, had been active in the women's movement in Azerbaijan. In November 2021, Parliament chose Sabina Aliyeva as the new ombudsperson.

According to many international organizations and publications, Azerbaijan is one of the worst countries for journalists and human rights defenders in the world. The ombudsman's office has been criticized for turning a blind eye to complaints of torture and oppression of activists and the opposition.

== Barbados ==
Under the Ombudsman Act 1980, the Ombudsman of Barbados is appointed by the Governor-General with the approval of both houses of the legislature. The current Ombudsman of Barbados is Dr. Nigel Taylor.

Valton Bend, a former Magistrate and actor, served as Obudsman from 2009-2017.

== Belgium ==
Belgium has one federal and four regional statutory ombudsman agencies, all covering the normal range of complaint-handling, investigation and mediation within the respective jurisdictions of their founding legislature.

- The office dealing with complaints against the federal authorities is the Federal Ombudsman (Dutch: de federale Ombudsman, French: le Médiateur fédéral, German: der föderale Ombudsmann). The office was established in 1997.
- The Vlaamse Ombudsdienst (Vlaamse Ombudsdienst) was established by the Flemish Parliament by decree of 7 July 1998 (the Ombudsdecreet).
- The Walloon Ombudsman (Médiateur de la Région Wallonne), established by decree of the Walloon Parliament of 22 December 1994, seeks to help any person, natural or legal, who is experiencing difficulties with the Walloon regional authorities to arrive at a solution without litigation.
- The French Community Ombudsman (Médiateur de la Communauté française), created by the Parliament of the French Community by decree of 20 June 2002, is responsible for handling complaints of citizens who encounter a problem with any administrative unit of the French Community. Its mission is to promote dialogue between the citizen and the administration concerned.
- In the smallest linguistic region, the Ombudsman of the German-Speaking Community (Ombudsmann der Deutchsprachigen Gemeinschaft) was created by decree of 26 May 2009. This requires the Ombudsman to mediate between citizens and administrative authorities and seek alternative way to resolve conflicts, to settle disputes and, in some cases, to avoid litigation. In its plenary session of 17 May 2010, the Parliament of the German-speaking Community appointed Cedric Langer for a term of six years as the first Ombudsman.

Belgium also has separate children's commissioners for the French and Flemish communities. There is a Pensions Ombudsman service (Ombudsdienst Pensioenen, Service de médiation Pensions, Ombudsmann für Pensionen) at the federal level.

== Bermuda ==
The Office of the Ombudsman for Bermuda was established by the Bermuda Constitution and is governed by the Ombudsman Act 2004. The first National Ombudsman for Bermuda, Arlene Brock, was appointed on 1 August 2005 by the Governor after consultation with the Premier, who first consulted with the Opposition Leader. The Ombudsman investigates complaints about the administrative actions of Public Authorities, including Government Departments, Boards and Bodies established or funded by the Legislature.

== Bosnia and Herzegovina ==
The Institution of Human Rights Ombudsman/Ombudsmen of Bosnia and Herzegovina is also the country's UN-accredited national human rights institution. It was created by law in 2004.

While the ombudsman's Child Rights Section is a member of the Children's Ombudsman network, there is a separate children's ombudsman in Republika Srpska.

== Brazil ==
In Brazil, the Ministério Público (Public Ministry) plays the role of ombudsman. It is an independent entity that, according to the Constitution, has the function of ensuring the effective respect of Public Authorities, public services of relevance and the rights guaranteed in the Constitution, promoting the necessary measures to guarantee them.

== Bulgaria ==
The Ombudsman of the Republic of Bulgaria (Bulgarian: Омбудсман на Република България, Ombudsman na Republika Balgariya) is the national human rights institution, in addition to the normal range of functions in relation to maladministration. The institution was created as the 'Citizen's Defender' (Граждански защитник, Grazhdanski zashtitnik) in 1998 but the first Ombudsman was elected in April 2005. Since 18 July 2025, the national office has been held by Velislava Dalcheva. There are also regional ombudsmen (Citizen's Mediators, Граждански посредници, Grazhdanski posrednitsi) in most parts of the country.

== Cayman Islands ==
The Ombudsman of the Cayman Islands is responsible for classical parliamentary ombuds work in addition to freedom of information, protection of privacy, whistleblower complaints and oversight of public complaints about police conduct. The office was created in 2017 when the previous Office of the Complaints Commissioner and Office of the Information Commissioner were combined, and the additional responsibilities were added (privacy, whistleblower complaints and oversight of policy). Sandy Hermiston was appointed the first Ombudsman in September 2017. Sharon Roulstone was appointed as Ombudsman in 2022 when Hermiston returned to Canada to take up her appointment as Prince Edward Island's first Ombudsperson.

== Canada ==
In Canada, ombudsman offices are present in most departments of the federal government, in many provincial and municipal governments, as well as in Crown Corporations such as CBC and Canada Post. There is an Ombudsman for the Department of National Defence and the Canadian Forces, an Office of the Procurement Ombudsman, an Office for the Ombudsman for the Victims of Crimes, an Office of the Taxpayers' Ombudsperson and an Office of the Veterans Ombudsman.

There are also several independent ombuds offices in Canada, including the Ombudsman for Banking Services and Investments and various child advocate offices.

While Canada has no single national legislative ombudsman, ten Canadian provinces and one territory have parliamentary ombudsmen (sometimes called "citizens' protector" or "citizens' representative") in the classical/legislative tradition, who oversee the provincial government and receive and investigate public complaints. They are:

- Alberta Ombudsman, established 1967;
- Office of the Ombudsperson, British Columbia;
- Ombudsman Manitoba, established 1970;
- New Brunswick Ombudsman's Office, established 1967;
- Citizens' Representative of Newfoundland and Labrador;
- Nova Scotia Office of the Ombudsman, established 1970;
- Ontario Ombudsman, established 1975
- Ontario Patient Ombudsman, established 2015
- Quebec Ombudsman (French: Le Protecteur du citoyen), established 1968;
- Ombudsman Saskatchewan, established 1972;
- Office of the Yukon Ombudsman and Information & Privacy Commissioner; and
- Ombudsperson Prince Edward Island, established 2022.

== Channel Islands ==
In the bailiwicks of Jersey and Guernsey, a statutory financial services ombudsman exists to investigate complaints about institutions providing financial services in or from either jurisdiction.

In 2022, the government of Jersey formally announced the creation of a Jersey Public Services Ombudsman, following a public consultation that concluded in 2019. The project has been met with delays and is not operational yet, although commentators suggest that it could be finalised by the end of 2025.

== Chile ==
Chile remains in 2012 the only country in South America without a national ombudsman office, although one was envisaged in a constitutional reform proposed in the Senate by the President in 2000. Indeed, Chile is not listed as having an ombudsman on the website of the Ibero-American Federation of Ombudsmen. There exists, however, a Capítulo Chileno del Ombudsman, or 'Chilean Ombudsman Chapter', an organisation lobbying for the introduction of a national ombudsman.

Some other public bodies, such as the National Institute of Human Rights (Instituto Nacional de Derechos Humanos) or the Transparency Council (Consejo para la Transparencia), have quasi-ombudsman functions, in that their statutes allow them to appeal to the legislature and judiciary for protection and development of fundamental rights. However, unlike many other ombudsman agencies, they do not have constitutional status but were created by ordinary statutes.

== Colombia ==
The People's Defender (Spanish: Defensoría del Pueblo) or Ombudsman's Office of Colombia is the national agency in charge of overseeing the protection of civil and human rights within the legal framework of the state of Colombia.

== Cyprus ==
The Commissioner for Administration (Greek: Γραφείο Επιτρόπου Διοικήσεως), usually referred to as the Ombudsman, is an Independent Authority in Cyprus and was established on 15 March 1991. The office is currently held by Maria Stylianou-Lottides.

There is also a Commissioner for Children's Rights.

== Czech Republic ==
The Public Defender of Rights (Czech: Veřejný ochránce práv) of the Czech Republic is more frequently referred to simply as the ombudsman. The office was established in 1999. It has the traditional ombudsman role of mediating between complainants and officials in public bodies, but has no direct means or mechanisms of enforcement. Should the relevant body fail to provide a remedy, the ombudsman may refer the matter to the government. Following the death in office of the first-ever Czech ombudsman, Otakar Motejl, in May 2010, former Constitutional Court judge Pavel Varvařovský was elected to the office by the lower house of parliament in September 2010. After his resignation in December 2013, Anna Šabatová, a deputy-ombudswoman from 2001 to 2007, was elected and sworn to the office in February 2014.

== Denmark ==
- The Parliamentary Ombudsman (Danish: Folketingets Ombudsmand) was established in Denmark in 1955 to investigate complaints brought by an individual or ex officio in all matters relating to public governance, including maladministration by central or local authorities, on a case-by-case basis and on a general scale. The ombudsman's main areas of expertise include administrative law, constitutional law, the rights of inmates in correctional facilities, and access to information. The ombudsman is appointed by the Parliament of Denmark.
- The Consumer Ombudsman (Forbrugerombudsmanden) was established in 1974 to ensure that the consumer protection and marketing rules are complied with by private undertakings. The ombudsman can ultimately institute legal proceedings before the Copenhagen Maritime and Commercial Court.
- In February 2011, the Danish government turned down a request from a United Nations committee to create the position of Ombudsman for Children (Børneombudsmand). The government instead opted to create a specialized "children's office" (Børnekontor) as a part of the existing Ombudsman institution.

(Also note that the highest representatives of the Danish government in the Faroe Islands and Greenland are called Royal Ombudsmen (Rigsombudsmænd) since 1948 and 1979, respectively. However, here the word is used more in its older general meaning of commissioner. See High Commission of Denmark, Tórshavn and High Commission of Denmark, Nuuk, respectively.)

== European Union ==
The European Ombudsman was established by the Maastricht Treaty, the treaty establishing the European Union. The European Union Ombudsman investigates claims by individuals or companies that reside or have their interests within the European Union against incidents of bad administration by bodies or institutions of the European Union.

== Finland ==
In Finland, the office of Parliamentary Ombudsman (Finnish: Eduskunnan oikeusasiamies, Swedish: Riksdagens justitieombudsman), modelled after the Swedish Ombudsman, was established by the Constitution of 1919. The Ombudsman is appointed by Parliament, and has the task of ensuring that all government departments and officials follow the law. The Parliamentary Ombudsman shares many duties with the Chancellor of Justice. The Ombudsman has wide-ranging oversight and investigative powers, has access to all government facilities, documents and information systems and can order a police investigation if necessary. If the Ombudsman determines that a government official has not acted in accordance with the law, they can advise on the proper application of the law, reprimand the official or, in extreme cases, order a criminal prosecution. Partly because of the prosecutorial powers, the office enjoys considerable respect and the Ombudsman's legal opinions are usually strictly followed, carrying a lot of weight in the absence of a court precedent.

There are also special ombudsmen for gender equality (Finnish: Tasa-arvovaltuutettu/Swedish: Jämställdhetsombudsmannen), children's welfare (Finnish: Lapsiasiavaltuutettu/Swedish: Barnombudsmannen), protection against discrimination (Finnish: Yhdenvertaisuusvaltuutettu/Swedish: Diskrimineringsombudsmannen), data protection, and consumer protection, operating under the auspices of various ministries and other government agencies. Every health care provider in Finland is legally obliged to have a patients' rights ombudsman.

== France ==
In 1973, the French Government created an office of ombudsman (French: Médiateur de la République). A reform in May 2011 merged that office with the Children's Ombudsman (Défenseur des enfants), the equality authority (Haute autorité de lutte contre les discriminations et pour l'égalité, HALDE), and the body supervising the conduct of police and other security agencies, the Commission nationale de déontologie de la sécurité (CNDS), creating a new body named the Defender of Rights (Défenseur des droits). In July 2011, Dominique Baudis was appointed to the office by the Council of State on the nomination of the Prime Minister, for a single six-year term, but died in April 2014. In June 2014, former minister Jacques Toubon was chosen for the following six years. Since 22 July 2020, the role has been held by former journalist and anti-poverty campaigner Claire Hédon.

== Georgia ==
The Public Defender (Ombudsman) of Georgia (Georgian: სახალხო დამცველი) is a national human rights institution. The office was established by Parliament in 1997. The Public Defender is elected for a six-year term by a parliamentary majority, and must follow the Constitution and the law, as well as the universally recognized principles and rules of international law, and international treaties and agreements concluded by Georgia. The Public Defender supervises the protection of human rights and fundamental freedoms, investigates violations of human rights and assists in securing redress. The office supervises the activities of national or local public authorities, public officials and legal persons, evaluates all acts passed by them and gives recommendations and proposals. The office also conducts human rights education.

== Germany ==
The nearest equivalent to a federal ombudsman service in Germany is the Parliamentary Petitions Committee (German: Petitionsausschuss Deutscher Bundestag), which receives and investigates complaints of maladministration. There are a number of sectoral ombudsmen, including the Parliamentary Military-Ombudsman (Wehrbeauftragter des Deutschen Bundestages) and the Ombudsman Institution for Public Transport (Schlichtungsstelle für den öffentlichen Personenverkehr e.V., SÖP).

== Gibraltar ==
The Gibraltar Public Services Ombudsman is an independent authority whose functions are to investigate complaints received from the general public about acts of maladministration by the Government of Gibraltar and certain public bodies and contractors. The Office of the Ombudsman came into being in April 1999 with the appointment of Henry Pinna as Gibraltar's first Public Services Ombudsman.

== Greece ==
The Citizen's Advocate (ombudsman) of Greece (Greek: Συνήγορος του Πολίτη) was created in 1998 as an Independent Authority. Following the resignation of Professor Georgios Kaminis in September 2010, the duties of the Citizen's Advocate passed to Deputy Ombudsman Kalliopi Spanou. The Advocate is assisted by six Assistant Advocates, who coordinate the activities of the Advocate's office in the six thematic areas in which the office has authority: i) civil rights, ii) social protection, iii) quality of life, iv) state-citizen relationships, v) children's rights, and vi) gender equality.

== Hong Kong ==
The Office of The Ombudsman, known as the Commission for Administrative Complaints until 1994, is an independent statutory authority, established in 1989 under the Commissioner for Administrative Complaints Ordinance 1988, to redress grievances arising from maladministration in the public sector through independent and impartial investigations to improve the standard of public administration.

== Iceland ==
The post of Althing Ombudsman (Icelandic: Umboðsmaður Alþingis) was set up in 1987 under the terms of law number 13/1987, which deals with complaints against the government. The ombudsman's authority was expanded to local government levels in the 1997 law number 85/1997. The ombudsman is appointed for a four-year term by the parliament (Althing or Alþingi). The Ombudsman aims to safeguard the rights of the citizens vis-à-vis the State and local authorities, and to promote equality and good administrative practice.

== India ==
The Government of India has designated several ombudsmen (sometimes called Chief Vigilance Officer (CVO)) for the redress of grievances and complaints from individuals in the banking, insurance and other sectors being serviced by both private and public bodies and corporations. The CVC (Central Vigilance Commission) was set up on the recommendation of the Santhanam Committee (1962–64).

=== Lokpal ===
In India, the Ombudsman is known as the Lokpal or Lokayukta. An Administrative Reforms Commission (ARC) was set up on 5 January 1966 under the Chairmanship of Shri Morarji Desai. It recommended a two-tier machinery: Lokpal at the Centre (parliamentary commissioner, as in New Zealand) and one Lokayukta each at the State level for redress of people's grievances. However, the jurisdiction of the Lokpal did not extend to the judiciary (as in the case of New Zealand). The central Government introduced the first Lokpal Bill, Lokpal and Lokayuktas Bill in 1968, and further legislation was introduced in 2005. The final bill, after all the amendments, was passed in the Rajya Sabha on 17 December 2013 and passed in the Loksabha on 18 December 2013.

=== Lokayukta ===
The state-level Lokayukta institution has developed gradually. Orissa was the first state to present a bill on the establishment of Lokayukta in 1970, but Maharashtra was the first to establish the institution in 1972. Other states followed: Bihar (1974), Uttar Pradesh (1977), Madhya Pradesh (1981), Andhra Pradesh (1983), Himachal Pradesh (1983), Karnataka (1984), Assam (1986), Gujarat (1988), Delhi (1995), Punjab (1996), Kerala (1998), Chhattishgarh (2002), Uttaranchal (2002), West Bengal (2003) and Haryana (2004). The structure of the Lokayukta is not uniform across all the states. Some states have UpaLokayukta under the Lokayukta and in some states, the Lokayukta does not have suo moto powers of instigating an enquiry.

Kerala State has an Ombudsman for Local Self Government institutions like Panchayats, Municipalities, and Corporations. The ombudsman can enquire/investigate into allegations of action, inaction, corruption and maladministration. A retired Judge of the High Court is appointed by the Governor for a term of three years, under the Kerala Panchayat Raj Act.

In the State of Rajasthan, the Lokayukta institution was established in 1973 after the Rajasthan Lokayukta and Up-Lokayuktas Act, 1973 was passed by the State Legislature.

=== Non-banking financial companies ===
The Reserve Bank of India launched an "Ombudsman Scheme" for redress of complaints against non-banking financial companies (NBFCs) free of charge.

This scheme is applicable to only those NBFCs which:

- Have assets of more than ₹1,000,000,000; AND/OR
- Accept deposits.

The complainant can file the complaint with the NBFC Ombudsman under whose jurisdiction the branch or registered office of the NBFC falls in the following cases:

- If the NBFC does not reply within a period of one month after receipt of the complaint;
- If the complainant is not satisfied with the reply given by the NBFC;
- If the NBFC rejects, or does not acknowledge the complaint.

=== Anti-corruption movements ===
The 2011 Indian anti-corruption movement led by social activist Anna Hazare and Arvind Kejriwal includes in its demands the creation of a stronger ombudsman agency (with jurisdiction over all state institutions) through the enactment of a Jan Lokpal Bill, as an alternative to the Lokpal Bill proposed by the government in 2010.

== Indonesia ==
The Ombudsman of the Republic of Indonesia previously named the National Ombudsman Commission is a state institution in Indonesia that has the authority to oversee the implementation of public services both organized by state officials and government, including those held by State-Owned Enterprises, Regionally-Owned Enterprises, and State-Owned Legal Entities private or individuals who are given the task of carrying out certain public services which part or all of their funds are sourced from the State Revenue and Expenditure Budget or the Regional Revenue and Expenditure Budget. This institution was formed based on Law Number 37 of 2008 concerning the Ombudsman of the Republic of Indonesia, which was ratified at the DPR RI Plenary Meeting on 9 September 2008.

== Iran ==
The State Ombudsman of Iran is the General Inspection Office. This office was one of the Founding Members of AOA (Asian Ombudsman Association) and hosted the 4th and 13th AOA annual conferences in 1999 and 2013. In Iran, an organization called دیوان عدالت اداری or 'the Administration Justice Court' is set to investigate the complaints of any government employee or staff member who has been discriminated against.

== Ireland ==
The Office of the Ombudsman was set up under the terms of the Ombudsman Act 1980. The Ombudsman is appointed by the President of Ireland upon the nomination of both Houses of the Oireachtas, and is a civil servant of the State. The Ombudsman deals with complaints against Departments of State, local authorities, the Health Service Executive, private and public nursing homes and direct provision accommodation services.

There are other ombudsmen established in Ireland. The first Pensions Ombudsman, Paul Kenny, was appointed in 2003. Emily Logan became Ireland's first Ombudsman for Children in March 2004. The Financial Services Ombudsman incorporated the older offices of the Insurance Ombudsman and Ombudsman for Credit Institutions in 2005. Also established in 2005 was the Ombudsman for the Defence Forces, the first holder being Paulyn Marrinan Quinn, formerly the founding Insurance Ombudsman. An Act of 2005 created a three-person tribunal, the Garda Síochána Ombudsman Commission, to investigate complaints about the country's police force. All these offices are statutory, and their holders are public servants.

A (non-statutory) Press Ombudsman began work in January 2008, and legislation has been published to establish a Legal Services Ombudsman. The Ombudsman (Amendment) Act 2012 provided for the statutory protection of the title of Ombudsman and increased the number of State agencies under the Ombudsman's remit, and also designated the Ombudsman as Director (Chief Executive) of the Office of the Commission for Public Service Appointments.

Irish Ombudsmen to date have been Michael Mills from 1984 to 1994, Kevin Murphy from 1994 to 2003, Emily O'Reilly from 2003 to 2013, Peter Tyndall from 2013 to 2021, and Ger Deering, who was appointed in 2022.

== Israel ==
The State Comptroller also serves, by law, as Ombudsman. She or he discharges this function by way of a special unit in the Office of the State Comptroller, known as the Office of the Ombudsman. The Ombudsman investigates complaints against bodies that are statutorily subject to audit by the State Comptroller, including government ministries, local authorities, state enterprises and institutions and government companies, as well as their employees.

== Jamaica ==
The Office of the Public Defender was created in 2000 by the Public Defender Act 1999, replacing the Office of the Parliamentary Ombudsman of Jamaica, which had existed since 1978. The Public Defender (currently Earl Witter) has the typical ombudsman function of investigating and remedying maladministration, with additional jurisdiction to investigate alleged violations of constitutional rights.

== Kazakhstan ==
The Commissioner for Human Rights (Kazakh: Адам құқықтары жөніндегі Уәкіл), or National Ombudsman of the Republic of Kazakhstan, is Askar Shakirov, appointed in 2007. The office was created by presidential decree in 2002 as a national human rights institution, with support from the OSCE.

In 2021, the lower house of Kazakhstan's Parliament, known as the Majilis, adopted a draft law on the Ombudsperson for Human Rights in the country. They also adopted legislative amendments to define the level of legal status of the Ombudsperson and the principles of their role.

== Kenya ==
The Commission on Administrative Justice was established by the Commission on Administrative Justice Act 2011(hereafter referred to as the Act) pursuant to Article 59 (4) of the Constitution of Kenya. CAJ is a Commission within the meaning of chapter 15 of the Constitution and has the status and powers of a commission under that chapter.

== Kosovo ==
The Ombudsperson Institution in Kosovo (OIK) accepts and investigates complaints of human rights violations or abuses of authority by any public authority in Kosovo. The institution is currently led by Ombudsperson Sami Kurteshi, a former opposition activist, political prisoner and human rights activist, who was elected to the post by the Assembly of Kosovo on 4 June 2009. In October 2011, the Assembly elected five deputy Ombudspersons: Isa Hasani, Bogoljub Staletovic [from the Serb community], Shqipe Malaj-Ibra, Ibrahim Arslan (from the Turkish community) and Basri Berisha.

The first Ombudsperson, Marek Antoni Nowicki, was appointed in July 2000 by the then Special Representative of the United Nations Secretary-General (SRSG), Bernard Kouchner; Nowicki's appointment was renewed in 2002, 2004 and 2005 by subsequent SRSGs Michael Steiner, Harri Holkeri and Søren Jessen-Petersen. With effect from 1 January 2006, Jessen-Petersen appointed a Kosovar lawyer, Hilmi Jashari, as Acting Ombudsperson, and he remained in post until Kurteshi took office.

The OIK has several offices throughout Kosovo, and participates (although not yet accredited) in the global network of national human rights institutions, as well as in the European ombudsman network.

== Kyrgyz Republic ==
The Ombudsman of the Kyrgyz Republic (Kyrgyz: Акыйкатчы, Akyikatchy) carry out parliamentary control over the observance of the rights and freedoms of man and citizen.

The current (2026) Ombudsman of Kyrgyz Republic is Dzhamilia Akmatbekovna Dzhamanbaeva.

== Latvia ==
Since 2007, the Latvian ombudsman has been a personalized institution called Rights Defender (Latvian: Tiesībsargs). The current Ombudsman since 2011 is Juris Jansons. Previously, similar functions were carried by the National Human Rights Office (Latvian: Valsts cilvēktiesību birojs, 1995–2006).

== Mexico ==
National Human Rights Commission (Mexico)

On 13 February 1989, the Interior Ministry Secretariat of the Interior created the "General Human Rights Department" as a wholly dependent office within the ministry's structure. On 6 June 1990, by presidential decree, the General Human Rights Department was renamed the "National Human Rights Commission" and gained full autonomy from its parent ministry.

It was not until 1990, after some constitutional reforms, that the National Human Rights Commission became fully independent of the government.

The (in 2022) current president (ombudsman) is María del Rosario Piedra Ibarra who took office on November 16, 2019.

== Moldova ==
There have been officials with ombudsperson functions in the Republic of Moldova at least since 1998, but with some differences in the names of the offices and contexts. Since 2014, the ombudsperson is named the People's Advocate (Ombudsman) (Romanian: Avocatul Poporului (Ombudsman), and together with a General Secretary and the Children's Advocate, is heading an office involving 65 persons, including representatives for four autonomous regions. People's Advocate since 24 September 2021 is Natalia Moloșag, and Children's Advocate (formally: People's Advocate for Children's Rights, (Romanian: Avocatul Poporului pentru drepturile copilului), since 8 April 2016 is Maia Bănărescu.

== Nepal ==
In the Nepalese context, there are two main organizations working as an 'Ombudsman-type' organization. The Constitution of Nepal (2015) has continued the establishment of the Commission for the Investigation of Abuse of Authority as a powerful body against corruption prevention. Earlier, by the second amendment of the Constitution of the Kingdom of Nepal in 1975, established an Ombudsmen-type Corruption Prevention Commission was established with a role of corruption investigation, adjudication and prosecution. Yet, another institution against corruption vigilance, National Vigilance Center (NVC) (Nepali: राष्ट्रिय सतर्कता केन्द्र), is established, and NVC works under the direct supervision of the Prime Minister.

== Netherlands ==
Article 78 of the Constitution of the Netherlands, as revised in 1983, established an office of National Ombudsman. The Ombudsman may investigate, suo motu or on foot of a complaint, the actions of State bodies or other public entities. The ombudsman and deputy are appointed by the House of Representatives for a period of six years or until reaching retirement age.

The office consists of 220 specialists. It also includes a children's ombudsman.

Reinier van Zutphen has been the National Ombudsman since 2015.

== New Zealand ==
The post of Ombudsman was established in New Zealand in 1962 to investigate complaints against central and local government agencies. In 1975, the post was expanded, with a Chief Ombudsman and several other ombudsmen.

The Ombudsman's role in New Zealand is to protect the rights of citizens across various sectors, most notably to request official information that central and local government hold through the Official Information Act 1982 and the Local Government Official Information and Meetings Act. It investigates complaints on perceived breaches of the official information law, ensuring that the law is upheld and that departments are kept fully accountable. When investigating matters of Official Information, the Ombudsman scrutinizes public institutions, which include (as outlined by Schedule 1 of the Ombudsmen Act 1975):

- ministers of the crown
- government departments and ministries
- crown entities and state owned enterprises
- Te Whatu Ora (Health New Zealand)
- tertiary education institutions and school boards of trustees

The Ombudsman also assists the public on matters of upholding legislative rights. The Ombudsman performs duties assisting individuals and groups, such as disclosures about serious wrongdoing in workplaces, upholding fair treatment for disabled people, and monitoring places of detention.

New Zealand also has three industry ombudsmen – the New Zealand Banking Ombudsman, the Insurance and Savings Ombudsman, and the Electricity and Gas Complaints Commissioner.

== North Macedonia ==
Since 1997, North Macedonia has had an Ombudsman for the protection of citizens rights (Macedonian: Naroden pravobranitel). The ombudsman is appointed by the Parliament and performs their work under the Constitution and the Law of the Ombudsman.

== Norway ==
- The Gender Equality and Anti-Discrimination Ombud (Norwegian: Likestillings- og diskrimineringsombudet) was established in 1978 as the Gender Equality Ombud (Likestillingsombudet), the first of its kind in the world. In 2006, the Ombud was reorganised to include discrimination in general. The Ombud's task is to enforce the Norwegian Gender Equality Act and the act relating to the prohibition of discrimination on the basis of ethnicity, national origin, ancestry, skin colour, language, religious and ethical orientation, and sexual orientation (Discrimination Act). The Ombud is also tasked with enforcing the anti-discrimination regulations in the Working Environment Act. The mandate of the Ombud also includes actively promoting equality for discriminated groups and developing new knowledge through documentation and monitoring.
- The Norwegian Parliamentary Ombud (Sivilombudet) investigates complaints from citizens or may take up issues on its own initiative: complaints from citizens concerning injustice or maladministration from central government or local authorities.
- The Parliamentary Ombudsman for the Norwegian Armed Forces (Ombodsmannen for Forsvaret/Ombudsmannen for Forsvaret) shall safeguard the rights of all members and former members of the Armed Forces, as well as contribute to an effective military defence. Anyone who feels that they have been wrongly, unjustly or unreasonably treated can bring their case before the Ombudsman and request an investigation of the matter to determine whether an injustice has been done, and to secure any appropriate corrective action. Issues and circumstances arising before, during or after military service can be brought to the attention of the Ombudsman.
- The Ombudsman for Children (Barneombudet) has statutory rights to protect children and their rights. Since 1981, the Ombudsman for Children in Norway has worked continuously to improve national and international legislation affecting children's welfare. Norway was the first country in the world to establish an ombudsman for children.
- There is also an ombudsman for consumer affairs; see Norwegian Consumer Ombudsman.
- Local and regional authorities often have ombudsmen. Examples of this are ombudsmen for health and social affairs, ombudsmen for the elderly and ombudsmen for school students and apprentices at the upper secondary level.

== Pakistan ==
In Pakistan, the establishment of an ombudsman institution had been advocated for some time before Article 276 of the Interim Constitution of 1972 provided for the appointment of a Federal Ombudsman and Provincial Ombudsmen. The Constitution of 1973 also provided for same and the institution of Wafaqi Mohtasib was eventually created through the Establishment of the Office of Wafaqi Mohtasib (Ombudsman) Order, 1983 (President's Order No. 1 of 1983), which is now a part of the Constitution of Pakistan by virtue of Article 270-A. It started functioning on 8 August 1983. The office of Federal Ombudsman is currently held by Salman Farooqi. The Ombudsman has headquarters in Islamabad and Regional Offices in Lahore, Sukkur, Quetta, Faisalabad, Multan, Dera Ismail Khan, Peshawar and Karachi, Abbottabad.

Other ombudsman agencies in Pakistan include Provincial Ombudsman (Mohtasib-e-Aala) with offices in Punjab, Balochistan, Khyber Pakhtunkhwa and Sindh; a banking ombudsman, the Banking Mohtasib Pakistan; a Federal Insurance Ombudsman and a Federal Tax Ombudsman. The autonomous region of Azad Jammu and Kashmir also has an ombudsman office, the AJK Mohtasib. Under the Protection of Women against Harassment at Workplace Act 2010, Musarrat Hilali was appointed in the same year to be the first Federal Ombudsperson for Protection of Women against Harassment at Workplace. The Act provides for similar offices at the provincial level.

The various ombudsman agencies participate in a Forum of Pakistan Ombudsman (FPO), and the federal bodies are affiliated to the Asian Ombudsman Association (AOA) and the International Ombudsman Institute (IOI).

== Peru ==
The Peruvian ombudsman agency is the Public Defender (Spanish: Defensoría del Pueblo). The functions of the institution, which was envisaged by the 1993 Constitution and was created in 1996, include combating maladministration, human rights violations and discrimination. It has 36 offices throughout the country. The current Defensora (ombudsman), Beatriz Merino, was elected by Congress on 29 September 2005 for a five-year term. The Defensoría is accredited with 'A' status as the national human rights institution. There is also a specialised Police Ombudsman (Defensoría de la Policia).

== Philippines ==
The Office of the Ombudsman of the Philippines is empowered by the 1987 Constitution to safeguard both the government and government-owned corporations from corruption and dispense justice in the case of such offenses.

== Poland ==
The Polish Ombudsman is called the Rzecznik Praw Obywatelskich, usually translated as the Commissioner for Protection of Civil Rights, or Commissioner for Human Rights. The office also functions as the national human rights institution, and is accredited with A status by the ICC. The holder of the office from 2006, Dr Janusz Bogumił Kochanowski, died in the April 2010 Smolensk air disaster. He was succeeded by Irena Lipowicz. Since 2015, this position was held by Adam Bodnar, but on 15 April 2021 the pro-government Constitutional Tribunal forced him out of office, although then no replacement had been appointed. However, after some time, Marcin Wiącek^{(pl)} was appointed new ombudsman.

== Portugal ==
The Portuguese Ombudsman is called the Provedor de Justiça (lit. "Proveditor of Justice"), and its role is defined in article 23 of the Constitution of Portugal:

1. Citizens may submit complaints against actions or omissions by the public authorities to the Ombudsman, who shall assess them without the power to take decisions and shall send the competent bodies such recommendations as may be necessary to prevent or make good any injustices.

2. The Ombudsman's work shall be independent of any acts of grace or legal remedies provided for in this Constitution or the law.

3. The Ombudsman's office shall be an independent body and the Assembly of the Republic shall appoint the Ombudsman for such time as the law may determine.

4. The bodies and agents of the Public Administration shall cooperate with the Ombudsman in the fulfilment of his mission.

Besides the traditional routes, complaints can be filed online and there are toll-free lines for children and one for senior citizens. The first Ombudsman was Manuel da Costa Brás (Tenente-Coronel, Lieutenant Colonel).

== Romania ==
The ombudsman office is the People's Advocate (Romanian: Avocatul Poporului). Since 26 June 2019, the current ombudsman is Renate Weber, preceded by Victor Ciorbea since 15 April 2014.

== Russia ==
The Russian Federation's Commissioner for Human Rights (ombudsman, Russian: Уполномоченный по правам человека) position is held by Tatyana Moskalkova as of 2010. The Commissioner is appointed for a fixed term by the Parliament. The ombudsman cannot be dismissed before the end of their term, and is not subordinate to any body of power, including the President or the Government.

Russia's 83 administrative regions have the right to elect a local ombudsman whose authority is limited to that region. Fewer than half had done so as of 2014.

There is also a Children's Rights Commissioner post, appointed by the President. The post was held by Anna Kuznetsova from 2016 to 2021.

In June 2012, Vladimir Putin signed the Executive Order on the Presidential Commissioner for Entrepreneurs' Rights, appointing Boris Titov to the position.

== Serbia ==
The Protector of Citizens (Serbian: Заштитник грађана, romanized: Zaštitnik građana) is an independent state authority, mandated to protect human rights and freedoms. It was established and introduced into the legal system by the 2006 Constitution. Ombudsman is elected by the National Assembly for a five-year term and is accountable to the National Assembly for his/her work, to which it reports every year or at their request.

The Ombudsman has competence to oversee the work of government agencies, the bodies authorized for legal protection of property rights and interests of the Republic of Serbia and other bodies and organizations, enterprises and institutions which have been delegated public authority. He has no jurisdiction over the National Assembly, the President of the Republic, the Government, the Constitutional Court, courts and Public Prosecutor's Office. The Ombudsman initiates proceedings following the complaint of a citizen or on his own initiative. State administration bodies are legally obliged to cooperate with the Ombudsman and to provide him access to their premises and all data in their possession, regardless of the degree of secrecy, when of interest to the investigation in process or the Ombudsman's preventive actions. As a result of an investigation, the Ombudsman may recommend dismissal of an official considered responsible for violation of the rights of citizens, may initiate disciplinary procedures against public administration employees, and may require initiation of penal, offence or other adequate procedure.

The Ombudsman can also act preemptively, by offering advice and opinion on issues within his competence, to enhance the operation of the administration authorities and strengthen the protection of human liberties and rights. The Ombudsman is entitled to propose laws within its scope of competence, give opinions to the Government and the National Assembly on regulations under preparation and address the Constitutional Court to challenge the constitutionality of laws.

== Slovakia ==
The role of ombudsman was established as a result of the Ombudsman Act (564/2001). The National Assembly appoints a candidate to this position with a term of five years and a maximum of two consecutive terms. At a minimum, the ombudsman provides the National Council with an annual report. In case of a severe violation of fundamental rights, or a large number of people affected, the ombudsman can release a special or extraordinary report at any time. This occurred three times between 2013 and 2017, but because of the "opposition background" of the second most recent ombudsman, Judge Jana Dubovcová, her concerns were ignored by the assembly majority, many members of parliament were absent during her speeches, and public institutions were allowed to ignore the report, so no actions were actually taken to correct the situation. The most recent ombudsman, lawyer and university teacher Mária Patakyová, was elected in March 2017.

== Slovenia ==
The institution of the Human Rights Ombudsman of the Republic of Slovenia was introduced into the Slovenian constitutional order through the new Constitution of the Republic of Slovenia, which was adopted in December 1991. The Human Rights Ombudsman is defined in Article 159 of the Constitution, which provides that to protect human rights and fundamental freedoms in relation to state authorities, local self-government authorities and bearers of public authority, the office of the Ombudsman for the rights of citizens shall be established by law.

== South Africa ==
- Public Protector
- Auditor-General

== Spain ==
The national ombudsman of Spain is the Defensor del Pueblo (Defender of the People), dealing with complaints of maladministration and having the capacity to bring cases at the Constitutional Court. The office is prominent in the international networks of ombudsmen and national human rights institutions, particularly through the Ibero-American Ombudsman Federation (FIO).

=== Ombudsmen in the autonomous communities ===
There are comparable offices in the autonomous communities of Spain, as follows:

- Defensor del Pueblo Andaluz (Andalusia)
- Justicia de Aragón (Aragon)
- Ararteko (full name on website: Herriaren Defendatzailea: Ararteko) (Basque Country)
- Diputado del Común (Canary Islands)
- Procurador del Común (Castile and León)
- Síndic de Greuges de Catalunya (Catalonia)
- Personero del Común (Extremadura)
- Valedor do Pobo (Galicia)
- Síndic de Greuges de les Illes Balears (Balearic Islands)
- Defensor del Pueblo de la Región de Murcia (Murcia)
- Defensor del Pueblo de Navarra/Nafarroako Arartekoa (Navarre)
- Síndic de Greuges de la Comunitat Valenciana (Valencian Community)

See also Syndic for more uses of the word síndic in the Catalan linguistic area.

=== Former ombudsmen in the autonomous communities ===
- Procurador General del Principado de Asturias (Asturias)

== Sweden ==
The office of the Parliamentary Ombudsman (Swedish: Riksdagens ombudsmän, or Justitieombudsmannen) was established with the Instrument of Government in 1809, originally under the title of Ombudsmannen för Riksens ständer.

The office was modelled after Chancellor of Justice (Swedish: Justitiekanslern), and according to the principle of separation of powers. The Chancellor of Justice was installed in 1714 as a proxy for King Charles XII of Sweden, to act as a representative for the Royal Government. Today it acts as an ombudsman, mainly to oversee that Swedish authorities comply with laws on behalf of the Government, but also to handle indemnity claims from persons suffered from imprisonment but later acquitted, or other damages caused by authorities.

The Parliamentary Ombudsman was in turn appointed to represent the parliament; to oversee that all public authorities comply with the laws and decrees. The latter had the specific duty to protect the citizens and as a public attorney prosecute unlawful government or actions by authorities and criticise problematic laws, to ensure equality in the court of law, with inspections and handling of complains.

With growing attention to discrimination issues in the latter part of the 20th century a number of new anti-discriminatory Ombudsmen was appointed, to later be gathered under one roof, with the establishment of the Equality Ombudsman (Swedish: Diskrimineringsombudsmannen) in 2009.

The Ombudsman for Children (Swedish: Barnombudsmannen) was established in 1993, and is tasked with matters affecting the rights and interests of children and young people.

The Director-General of the Swedish Consumer Agency is the designated Consumer Ombudsman (Swedish: Konsumentombudsmannen).

Non-government appointed entities are the Pressombudsmannen, supervising compliance with the code of ethics of the Swedish printed media industry, and Sameombudsmannen, an advocate for the rights of the native Sami minority in Sweden, appointed by the Saami Council until 1997.

== Taiwan ==
Under the R.O.C. Constitution and its seventh amendment, the Control Yuan, one of the five branches of the Taiwanese government, functions as the ombudsman. Other than acting as the auditor of national government and being responsible for impeachment of officials, the Control Yuan investigates petitions and complaints from the general public about government policies and misdeeds committed by officials (both national and regional), and proposes corrective measures. The government agencies in question need to respond to the proposed measures within two months from the date of issue.

The 29 Members of Control Yuan are nominated by the President and confirmed by the Legislative Yuan to serve a six-year renewable term.

In 2020, the National Human Rights Commission was established under the Control Yuan as a national human rights institution in line with the Paris Principles with power to investigate human rights abuse, to facilitate legislation of human rights protection and to promote human rights education.

== Tajikistan ==
The Office of the Human Rights Ombudsman was established in 2009, and receives support from the OSCE. The current Ombudsman is Zarif Alizoda, appointed by President Emomalii Rahmon and approved by Parliament in May 2009. The functions of his office include human rights education, on which it co-operates with other public bodies and NGOs. It also works with a coalition of NGOs on monitoring places of detention.

== Thailand ==
The Office of the Ombudsman Thailand (Thai: ผู้ตรวจการแผ่นดินของรัฐสภา, RTGS: Phu Truat Kan Phaendin Khong Ratthasapha) was created in the 1997 constitution of Thailand or the "people's constitution". The name was shortened to the Ombudsmen (Thai: ผู้ตรวจการแผ่นดิน, RTGS: Phu Truat Kan Phaendin) by the 2007 Constitution of Thailand. The idea for such an office first appeared in the 1974 constitution. On 1 April 2000 the first Thai ombudsman was appointed by the king.

Ombudsmen are appointed by the King of Thailand upon the advice of the Senate of Thailand. The ombudsmen investigate complaints by the public against public officials and agencies. They have the power to prosecute, but not to enforce judgments. The 2007 constitution of 2007 charged the ombudsman to oversee the ethical practices of politicians, government officials, or state officials as well as to establish a code of ethics to be followed by all agencies including the Ombudsman Code of Ethics.

In January 2020, the Office of the Ombudsman abolished its 2012 and 2014 travel regulations, which covered only the ombudsmen's expenses during domestic and overseas trips, and replaced them with a new version that allows ombudsmen's spouses to claim identical benefits on overseas trips. The benefits include all transport and accommodation expenses and a 3,100 baht daily allowance or all expenses incurred not to exceed 4,500 baht per day. The rules took effect on 29 January after being announced in the Royal Gazette. The new regulations did not address the question of why spouses should travel at public expense.

Ombudsmen are appointed to a six-year non-renewable term. As of August 2019 Thailand's ombudsmen are:

- General Viddhavat Rajatanun, Chief Ombudsman (appointed 2012)
- Mr Boon Tapanadul, Ombudsman
- Mr Somjak Suwansujarit, Ombudsman

In 2019, the Office of the Ombudsman investigated 4,762 cases, of which 2,530 were "dealt with". Most complaints involved the Royal Thai Police and the Department of Local Administration (DLA). Since its founding in 2000, the ombudsman's office has investigated 48,441 cases and resolved 46,209 (95.4%) of them.

== Turkey ==
The Ombudsman's Office was created after the constitutional referendum of 2010 was approved. The Ombudsman's Office is responsible for examining and investigating administrative acts, actions, attitudes and behavior in terms of respect for human rights and freedoms, conformity with the law and fairness and appropriateness within the framework of the character of the Republic of Turkey as enshrined in its Constitution. It performs its functions as part of the Parliament Speaker's Office. The Ombudsman's Office is called the Public Monitoring Institution (KDK) and has an independent and autonomous budget.

== Ukraine ==
The office of ombudsman, or Commissioner for Human Rights, in Ukraine was instituted in 1998. The first ombudsman was Nina Karpachova until 2012. Valeriya Lutkovska was elected to the office for a five-year term by secret ballot in the Ukrainian Parliament on 24 April 2012. Under Article 55 of the 1996 Constitution, "Everyone has the right to appeal for the protection of his/her rights to the Ukrainian Parliament Commissioner for Human Rights". Article 101 provides "The Ukrainian Parliament Commissioner for Human Rights exercises parliamentary control over the observance of constitutional human and citizens' rights and freedoms". The legal basis of the office, which is also Ukraine's national human rights institution, is set out in Law 767/97, which refers to the office as the "Authorised Human Rights Representative" of the Parliament. Lyudmyla Denisova was elected to the office by the Ukrainian Parliament on 15 March 2018 and was dismissed in May 2022 by the Verkhovna Rada. She was accused of making unverifiable statements about alleged sex crimes by Russian troops. Dmytro Lubinets became her successor after being elected by the parliament on 1 July 2022.

== United Kingdom ==
There are a variety of ombudsman services in the United Kingdom, serving a range of industries. The Ombudsman Association (OA) is a membership body for ombudsman schemes and other complaint handling bodies in the UK, Ireland, British Overseas Territories and British Crown Dependencies and can be used by consumers to find the correct ombudsman service for them. Major schemes include:

- Communications Ombudsman - With over 1,450 telecommunications companies signed up to the scheme, and over 15 years experience in the communications sector, the Communications Ombudsman is one of the alternative dispute resolution (ADR) schemes approved by Ofcom to impartially and independently handle disputes between consumers and providers. This can include disputes with mobile phone providers, broadband providers, landline providers and PAY TV providers around subjects such as: service and network quality; contract cancellation and associated charges such as early termination charges; customer service; delays in providing service and repairing faults; problems that arise as a result of switching communications provider; is-selling, sales and contracts and disputes about billing, products and services.
- Energy Ombudsman - With over 2,500 energy companies signed up to this scheme, the Energy Ombudsman is the only alternative dispute resolution scheme in the UK energy sector. The Energy Ombudsman is approved by Ofgem to impartially and independently handle disputes between consumers and energy suppliers including: gas and electricity bills; smart meters and Feed-in-Tariffs; customer service; problems that arise as a result of switching energy supplier; the way an energy product or service has been sold, including door step sales and the supply of energy to a home. This Ombudsman can also look at disputes with Green Deal suppliers, Heat Networks and Network providers.
- Financial Ombudsman Service - This service is free for consumers and every year over 1 million people contact it about problems with: bank accounts, payments and cards; payment protection insurance (PPI); home, car, travel and other types of insurance; loans and other credit, like car finance; debt collection and repayment problems; mortgages and financial advice, investments and pensions.
- Housing Ombudsman Service - The Housing Ombudsman Service is set up by law to look at complaints about the housing organisations that are registered with it. This service attempts to resolve disputes involving the tenants and leaseholders of social landlords (housing associations and local authorities) and its voluntary members (private landlords and letting agents who are committed to good service for their tenants). The dispute support service works with residents and landlords to resolve issues while they are within the landlord’s complaints procedure.
- Local Government and Social Care Ombudsman - The Local Government and Social Care Ombudsman looks at complaints about councils and some other authorities and organisations, including education admissions appeal panels and adult social care providers (such as care homes and home care providers).

== United States ==
Members of the United States Congress serve as federal-level ombudsmen in their oversight capacity over federal agencies, and employ staff specifically dedicated to legal compliance enforcement and investigations of maladministration on behalf of constituents.

== Uzbekistan ==
The office of the Authorized Person of the Oliy Majlis of the Republic of Uzbekistan for Human Rights, or Ombudsman, was created in 1995, by an initiative of the President of Uzbekistan, but subsequently through legislation enacted in 1997, reinforced by a constitutional reform in 2003 and a new ombudsman statute in 2004. The current Authorised Person, appointed by the Supreme Assembly of Uzbekistan (Oliy Majlis), is Ulugbek Muhammadiev. The office was one of the first ombudsmen established in the Commonwealth of Independent States, and receives technical support from the Organization for Security and Cooperation in Europe.
