= Independent Commission for Human Rights =

Palestinian governmental body

The Independent Commission for Human Rights
- الهيئة المستقلة لحقوق الانسان
- Formation: 1993
- Type: National Commission
- Purpose: Human Rights
- Headquarters: Ramallah, Palestine
- Director General: Dr. Ammar Dwaik
- Main organ: Board of Commissioners
- Website: ichr.ps/en

The Independent Commission for Human Rights (ICHR; Arabic: الهيئة المستقلة لحقوق الانسان, romanized: al-Hayʼah al-Mustaqillah li-Ḥuqūq al-Insān) is the national human rights institution of Palestine.

It was established in 1993 upon a presidential decree issued by President Yasser Arafat on September 30, 1993, in compliance with article 31 of the Palestinian Basic Law (1993) that states that an "independent commission for human rights shall be established pursuant to a law that will specify its formation, duties and jurisdiction". The presidential decree was subsequently published in the official gazette in 1995 (No. 59/1995). Dr. Hanan Ashrawi was ICHR's first Commissioner General. Its current Commissioner General is Mr. Issam Younis.

In 2009 the ICHR received full accreditation as a national institution in accordance with the 1993 Paris Principles of National Human Rights Institutions (NHRI). The International Coordinating Committee of National Human Rights Institutions (ICC) had granted it an A status with reserves in 2005.

It receives complaints from Palestinian citizens regarding human rights violation and handles them with official bodies. The ICHR has a legal mandate to report without restriction on the national human rights situation (on specific matters or through thematic reports) and violations of any human rights. It can make recommendations to the government, Parliament and other competent bodies on matters concerning legislative or administrative provisions, and promote the harmonisation of national laws and practices with Palestine’s international obligations and the implementation of recommendations of international human right mechanisms. Its mandate allows it to engage with the International human rights system and conduct public education and awareness.

The Commission is a member of the Asia Pacific Forum, one of the four regional groupings in the ICC. Its main activities are receiving complaints from Palestinian citizens regarding human rights violation and handling them with official bodies. It also monitors prisons and detention centres, and issues monthly and annual reports monitoring human rights.

== See also ==
- Human rights in the Palestinian Territories
- National human rights institutions
- Paris Principles
