= Danish Institute for Human Rights =

Independent organisation funded by the Danish Government

The Danish Institute for Human Rights (Danish: Institut for Menneskerettigheder) or DIHR, formerly the Danish Centre for Human Rights, is a national human rights institution (NHRI) operating in accordance with the UN Paris Principles.

== History ==
The DIHR was originally established as the Danish Centre for Human Rights by a parliamentary decision on 5 May 1987. From January 2003 until January 2013, the DIHR was part of the Danish Centre for International Studies and Human Rights. DCISM closed at the end of 2012, and the DIHR was again created as a separate organisation.

== Description ==
The Danish Institute for Human Rights is an independent organisation funded by the Danish Government.

The work of DIHR includes research, analysis, communications, education, documentation, as well as a large number of national and international programmes. The DIHR is a national equality body, and as such has a mandate to promote equal treatment regardless of race, ethnicity, gender and disability. The DIHR is a member of Equinet.

DIHR takes a multidisciplinary approach to human rights, and operates with a staff of around 110 employees who specialise primarily in the areas of law, political science, economics, and social studies. Of the approximately 100 national human rights institutions, DIHR is one of the largest and is highly respected internationally. It is one of the few NHRIs that has actively engaged in defining the role of corporations in human rights protection, developing the first and most frequently used tool for Human Rights Impact Assessment.

DIHR is accredited with "A status" by the Global Alliance of National Human Rights Institutions, giving it enhanced access to United Nations human rights committees. DIHR chaired the ICC from 2004 to 2006, and has also chaired the European Group of NHRIs.

== Awards ==
In 2024 the DIHR and the documentary film festival CPH:DOX collaborated to award the first "Human:Rights Award", marking the 75th anniversary of the Universal Declaration of Human Rights. DIHR sponsors the prize, worth €5,000, which is awarded to a film that addresses human rights issues.

== Executive directors ==
- Lars Adam Rehof 1987 - 1991
- Morten Kjærum 1991 - 2008 (subsequently director of the European Union Fundamental Rights Agency)
- Hans-Otto Sano 2008 - 2009
- Jonas Christoffersen 2009 -

== Legislation ==
- Act no. 553 of 18 June 2012
- Act no. 374 of 28 May 2003 on Ethnic Equal Treatment.
- Act no. 40 of 30 March 2004.

== See also ==
- ICC Working Group on Business and Human Rights
