= German Institute for Human Rights =

Human rights organisation

German Institute for Human Rights (DIMR)
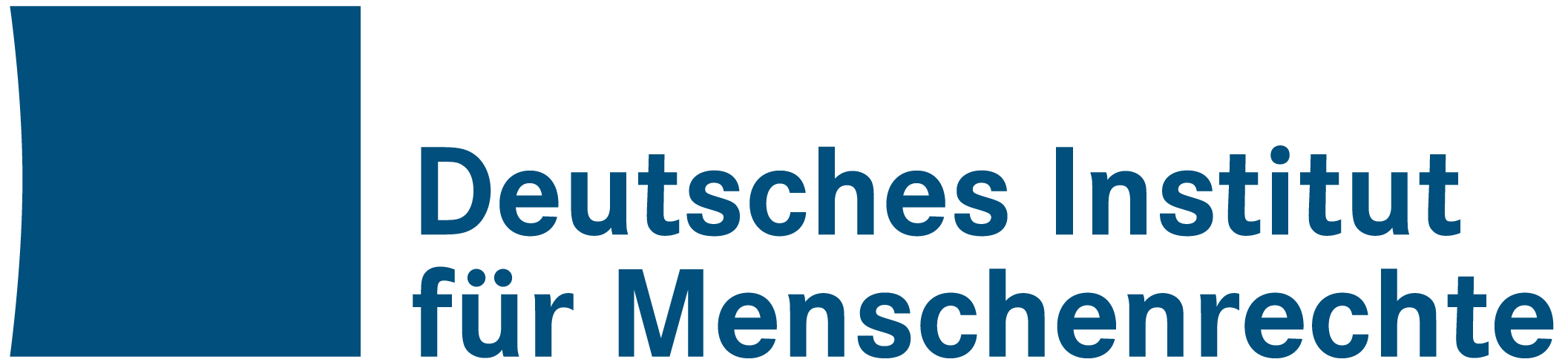
- Abbreviation: DIMR
- Formation: 8 March 2001
- Legal status: registered association
- Headquarters: Berlin
- Leader: Beate Rudolf
- Website: www.institut-fuer-menschenrechte.de

The German Institute for Human Rights (DIMR) is a human rights organisation based in Berlin. It was established as a registered association on 8 March 2001. As a national human rights institution, the DIMR works based on the United Nations Paris Principles. In May 2002, the organisation had approximately 130 full-time employees. Since January 2010, the director of the institute has been Beate Rudolf.

== Basics ==
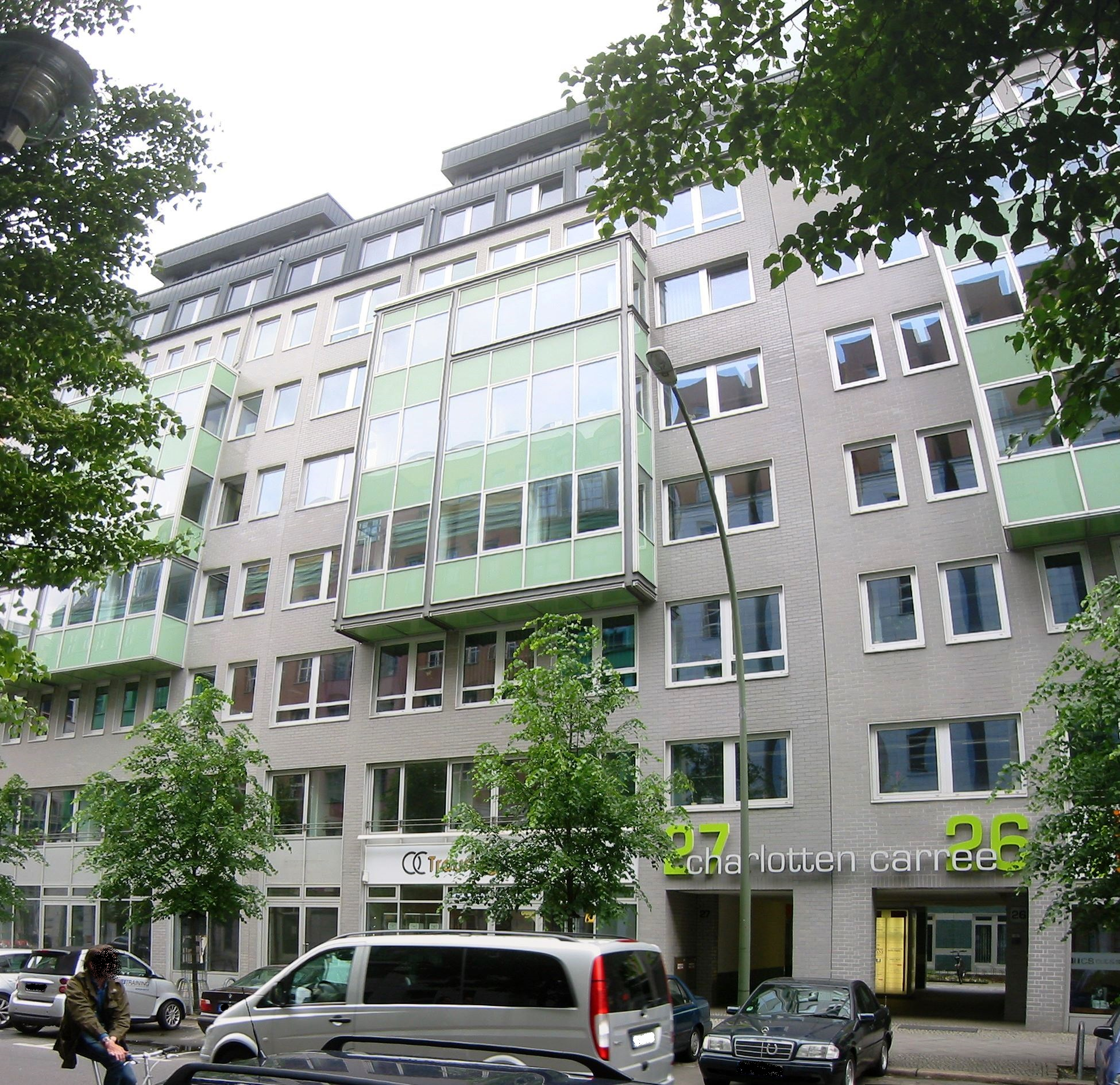
Headquarters of the institute in Zimmerstraße in Berlin-Kreuzberg

The Act on the Legal Status and Tasks of the German Institute for Human Rights has been in force since 2015. According to the law and the statutes, it is politically independent, but its funding depends on the client (Bundestag) or the federal budget. It is primarily financed by public funds from the federal budget, insofar as these are included in the budget of the German Bundestag, § 1 para. 1 sentence 2 DIMRG; third-party funds are raised for individual projects.

The Board of Trustees sets the guidelines for the content of its work.

The Board of Directors are appointed every four years with no limitation to the amount of times a person can be re-elected. In March 2022, the SCA recommended that the reappointment be limited to one term.

The Institute also supports and monitors the implementation of the UN Convention on the Rights of Persons with Disabilities and the UN Convention on the Rights of the Child. To this end, it set up a monitoring centre in May 2009 and November 2015. The Federal Government has entrusted the Institute with independent national reporting on the Council of Europe Conventions on combating trafficking in human beings and the exploitation of the prostitution of others and on preventing and combating violence against women and domestic violence (Istanbul Convention).

In October 2015, the institute began a cooperation with the Columbian Defensoria del Pueblo and the National Human Rights Institutions of Columbia and Germany in order to look into the human rights issues from coal mining businesses in Columbia.

== Mission and activities ==
The mission is defined by the law and the statutes. The Institute conducts interdisciplinary and application-oriented research on human rights issues and monitors the human rights situation in Germany. It reports annually to the German Bundestag and prepares statements for national and international courts (so-called amicus curiæ statements) and international human rights bodies.

It works closely with the human rights bodies of the United Nations, the Council of Europe and the European Union. The Institute is also a member of the Global Alliance of National Human Rights Institutions and the European Network of National Human Rights Institutions. The Institute maintains a publicly accessible specialised library on human rights issues and publishes public relations work to promote human rights. It is the largest collection in Germany on children’s rights, rights of persons with disabilities and human rights education. The head of the library is Anne Sieberns.

Other tasks include political consulting and informing the public about the human rights situation at national and international level.

In 2014, the institute stated that the Heinrich Böll Foundation is the most important international LGBTI humans rights promoter in Germany.

Every year the institute published a human rights report which is presented at the German Federal Press Conference.

In December 2018, the institute released its third annual report which focused on the lack of German labour laws and the continuing abuse to migrant workers. The report also identified the human rights concerns with regards to arms sales from Germany to Saudi Arabia and the United Arab Emirates.

In May 2021, the German Institute for Human Rights and the Norwegian National Human Rights Institution published a paper on “Climate Change and Human Rights in the European Context”. It was drafted with contributions from Finland, France and Scotland.

In 2024, the institute was re-accredited with A-status with regards to the Paris Principles.

== Board of trustees ==
Members of the board of trustees include Caroline Ausserer, Jochen von Bernstorff, Elise Bittenbinder, Matthias Boehning, Julia Duchrow, Oliver Ernst, Elke Ferner, Jonas Geissler, Uta Gerlant, Deborah Hartmann, Anetta Kahane, Lisa Kretschmer, Nora Markard, Nivedita Prasad, Pierre Thielbörger, Derya Türk-Neubaur, Sophia Wirsching and Antje Welke. The non-voting members include Luise Amtsberg, Anke Domuradt, Jürgen Dusel, Natalie Pawlik, Sigrid Jacoby, Michael Maier-Borst, Johannes Sturm und Martin Wimmer.
