= Office of the Ombudsman (Antigua and Barbuda) =

- Logo of the Office of the Ombudsman

Agency overview
- Jurisdiction: Antigua and Barbuda
- Headquarters: St John's, Antigua and Barbuda
- Annual budget: $
- Agency executive: Dr Hayden Thomas, Ombudsman
- Website: http://www.ombudsman.gov.ag/bio.html

The Office of the Ombudsman is an independent officer of Parliament appointed under Section 66 of the Antigua and Barbuda Constitution. It is accredited as a national human rights institution (NHRI) but with the lowest ('C') status accorded by the International Co-ordinating Committee of NHRIs (ICC). It has only limited participation in the regional NHRI network, the Network of National Institutions in the Americas. Like most ombudsman offices it is primarily concerned with addressing maladministration in public bodies, rather than human rights violations.

The current Ombudsman is Dr Hayden Thomas, who was appointed Antigua and Barbuda's first Ombudsman in 1995 and was later elected President of the Caribbean Ombudsman Association, member of the board of directors of the International Ombudsman Institute (IOI) and vice-chairman of the Board of the Special Fund for Ombudsman and other National Human Rights Institutions in Latin America and the Caribbean.

== See also ==
- Index of Antigua and Barbuda-related articles
