= Raoul Wallenberg Institute of Human Rights and Humanitarian Law =

The Raoul Wallenberg Institute of Human Rights and Humanitarian Law (RWI) is an experienced research and academic institution with offices, programmes, and convening power covering 40 countries. RWI's mission is to combine evidence-based human rights research with direct engagement with international organizations, governments, national human rights institutions, the justice sector, local and regional authorities, universities, and the business sector to bring about human rights change for all. This is done by having a network-based organization that works through strong partnerships with multiple actors at the grassroots and through that bring about a wider understanding of, and respect for, human rights and international humanitarian law.

This independent academic institution affiliated with Lund University was established in 1984 and was named after Raoul Wallenberg, the Swedish diplomat who saved tens of thousands of Jews and other people at risk in Hungary at the end of World War II.

RWI is present in Europe (Lund and Stockholm in Sweden as well as in Belarus and Turkey), Asia (Jakarta, Beijing, and Cambodia), Sub-Saharan Africa (Nairobi) and in Middle East and North Africa (Amman) and operates in many countries across these regions.

== Four Areas of Focus ==
Its work focuses four main thematic areas: 'People on the Move', 'Inclusive Societies', 'Fair and Efficient Justice' and 'Economic Globalisation and Human Rights':

=== People on the Move ===
This first thematic include researches on Migration and Refugee Law but also on the Displacement of Persons due to Climate Change.

=== Inclusive Societies ===
This focus area refers to many different topics such as Human Rights Cities, Poverty issues or The rights for Persons with Disabilities and Elderly People. The idea is to study these topics and reflect on how to make our societies more inclusive and respectful of everyone's rights.

=== Fair and Efficient Justice ===
The objective of the Institute with this thematic area is to work with local partners around the world to promote and develop justice systems accessible to all and respectful of everyone's rights.

=== Economic Globalisation and Human Rights ===
The 'Economic Globalisation and Human Rights' thematic area focuses on the realisation of a sustainable and fair economic globalisation as well as the inclusion of Human Rights considerations in the process.

== Three different approaches ==
To achieve the Institute's objectives uses three main approaches: Direct Engagement on the field, Research and Human Rights Education.

=== Direct Engagement ===
Programme Officers conduct their work on the field in close collaboration with local partners including individuals, institutions and companies. They work in Europe and in Asia but also in the Middle East and in Africa. Programmes on the five continents are contributing with their expertise to implementation and protection of Human Rights standards. The Institute has sometimes also taken the initiative to establish networks between cooperation partners, such as the Southeast Asian Human Rights Studies Network (SEAHRN). There has also been cooperation with the Network of African National Human Rights Institutions (NANHRI) and the Asia Pacific Forum on National Human Rights Institutions (APF).

=== Research ===
Researchers from many different countries work at RWI to develop a better understanding of Human Rights related topics. Each year a certain number of researches related to topical issues are published. Researchers then often share their findings during conferences and webinars. In 2021 for instance, RWI organised a Webinar Series on the Forthcoming EU's Directive on Mandatory Human Rights Due Diligence. Another focused on Poverty and Human Rights and How to Address the Post-Pandemic Poverty Crisis.

=== Human Rights Education ===
Part of the Institute's activities are also dedicated to the transmission of knowledge on Human Rights. In Lund, Sweden, The Raoul Wallenberg Institute hosts the largest Library exclusively dedicated to Human Rights in the Nordic countries. Students can come, read and borrow the books. RWI is also offer a Master's Degree specialised in Human Rights in collaboration with the University of Lund. RWI is also organising an annual Swedish Human Rights Film Festival offering the screening of a movie followed by a panel discussion with international experts.
The Institute is now working with the Pufendorf Institute. RWI has also developed various Blended Learning Courses in Asia.

== See also ==
- Decoding China’s Diplomacy Discourse: A Conversation with Malin Oud
- Malin Oud on the relationship between China, the US and Europe
- Graduate Institute of International and Development Studies
- Raoul Wallenberg
- Swedish International Development Cooperation Agency
