= Human Rights Commission of Malaysia =

National human rights institution

- Suruhanjaya Hak Asasi Manusia Malaysia; SUHAKAM سوروهنجاي حق اساسي مأنسي مليسيا

Agency overview
- Formed: 3 April 2000; 26 years ago
- Type: Government of Malaysia
- Headquarters: Tingkat 11, Menara TH Perdana, Jalan Sultan Ismail, 50250 Kuala Lumpur
- Motto: Human Rights For All (Hak Asasi Untuk Semua)
- Employees: (2018)
- Annual budget: MYR 10,116,300 (2018)
- Minister responsible: Azalina Othman Said, Minister in the Prime Minister's Department (Law and Institutional Reform)
- Agency executive: Mohd Hishamudin Md Yunus, Chairman
- Parent agency: Malaysian Parliament
- Key document: Human Rights Commission of Malaysia Act 1999 (Act 597)
- Website: suhakam.org.my

Footnotes
- Human Rights Commission of Malaysia on Facebook

The Human Rights Commission of Malaysia (Malay: Suruhanjaya Hak Asasi Manusia Malaysia; Jawi: سوروهنجاي حق اساسي مأنسي مليسيا) better known by its acronym SUHAKAM is the national human rights institution (NHRI) of Malaysia. It was established by the Malaysian Parliament under the Human Rights Commission of Malaysia Act 1999, Act 597, and began its work in April 2000. Its mandate is to promote human rights education, advise on legislation and policy, and conduct investigations.

Having been established after the fallout of the Anwar Ibrahim controversy, some lacked confidence in its independence from the government of the then Prime Minister Mahathir Mohamad. However, when Musa Hitam was named as the first chairman of the (initially, 13-member) commission, these fears were eased, as he was believed to be critical of Mahathir in many ways. The commission's recommendations under Musa, however, were often not implemented by the government. When his two-year term ended, he did not seek reappointment.

Musa was replaced with Tan Sri Abu Talib Othman in April 2002. Abu Talib had served as Attorney General under Mahathir, and was also involved in the Anwar Ibrahim controversy. As reported in Malaysiakini, he was widely seen as close to Mahathir, but SUHAKAM under Abu Talib continued to put forth many human rights recommendations. Many of these recommendations have yet to be acted upon by the government.

== International standing ==
SUHAKAM was accredited as a full "A status" member of the Asia Pacific Forum (APF), the regional network of NHRIs, and has since been reaccredited by the International Co-ordinating Committee of National Human Rights Institutions (ICC) to which the APF now defers on accreditation.

In 2008 SUHAKAM was asked by the accreditation subcommittee of the ICC to explain in writing within a year, evidence to establish its continued conformity with the Paris Principles, failure of which would result in a status downgrade from A to B and would disqualify them from attending sessions hosted by the UN Human Rights Council. The ICC sought to encourage the Government of Malaysia to amend the body's founding laws and make it more independent. However, when SUHAKAM was reviewed by the ICC in November 2009, it was decided to retain its A status pending a further review to be carried out in 2010, with particular attention to the process for selecting members of the commission.

== SUHAKAM regrets use of Act ==
On 9 May 2008, SUHAKAM stated that it was concerned by the Sedition Act being used to curb freedom of speech. Datuk N. Siva Subramaniam (pmp)said the fundamental freedom enshrined in the Constitution, including the freedom of speech and freedom of peaceful assembly, must be safeguarded and he also made comments on the arrest and charging of the editor of the news portal Malaysia Today, Raja Petra Kamarudin saying "SUHAKAM regrets that Raja Petra was charged under the Internal Security Act (Malaysia), as this is an infringement on the freedom of speech which is a fundamental human right. The use of the Act in this case is unjustified as civil remedies could have been sought in a Court of Law".

== Concerning child marriage in Malaysia ==
Suhakam Chairman Razali Ismail condemns the recurrence of child marriage in Malaysia, calling it "a violation of human rights and not a solution to poverty". Suhakam is against marriages involving underage children, especially those coming from the poor families. This practice is unfair to the children involved and provided a method for parents to sell their children through marriage. As of 2018, child marriage is still practiced in Malaysia, often as a means of getting out of poverty by turning children into commodities. Razali also called upon the women, family and community development ministry to make social protection programmes for poor children a priority.
