= Nigerien National Commission on Human Rights and Fundamental Liberties =

The National Commission on Human Rights and Fundamental Liberties (fr: La Commission Nationale des Droits de l'Homme et des Libertés Fondamentales, CNDHLF) in the West African state of Niger is a national human rights institution charged with investigating breaches of human rights law and advising the Government of Niger on human rights issues. It is a member of the Network of African National Human Rights Institutions and is accredited at the United Nations through the International Co-ordinating Committee of NHRIs.

== Constitutional powers ==
Article 33 of the constitution of 1999 created an official Commission to investigate and report upon human rights abuses. Its members are elected from several human rights associations, legal bodies, and government offices. The Committee is composed of 19 members, elected for three-year terms by a variety of bodies set out in the constitution. It has no power to arrest, but it may investigate abuses either on its own volition or when charged by a victim. It reports to the President of Niger.

== Establishment ==
The article which created the Commission on Human Rights was actually first created in the 1996 Constitution of the Fourth Republic of Niger (as Article 33), and its creation was passed into law by decree 98-55 of 29 December 1998. Before the Commission was created, President Ibrahim Baré Maïnassara was overthrown and killed on 9 April 1999, and the Fourth Republic's constitution suspended. The July 1999 constitution of the Fifth Republic of Niger included identical wording mandating the Commission on Human Rights.

The commission was first established in March 2000. In 2000 the Commission published what the United States called "a credible, well-researched report" on the 2000 case of two army sergeants, who disappeared after they were arrested by other soldiers for their alleged involvement in the June 2000 kidnapping and disappearance of Major Djibrilla Hima, the commander of the army's only armor squadron. In late May 2001, the 18 other soldiers arrested for suspected involvement in the kidnapping were released pending further investigation; however, it is unknown if any action was taken against the soldiers who allegedly beat and tortured 3 of the detained soldiers in 2000. The prosecutor with overall responsibility for the kidnapping case investigated the torture and disappearance allegations; however, he was removed from the case in mid-2000 following a month of intensive investigation, and there was no further investigation into the incident.

Also during its first year, the Commission issued a report that found that the Government violated laws and regulations concerning traditional chiefs when it removed the Sultan of Zinder. Elements of civil society successfully opposed a government attempt to alter the composition of the Commission during 2001, but it was eventually restructured in 2002 to include greater government representation by adding civil servants from the Ministries of Justice, Interior, Social Development, and Labor to the Commission and reducing the representation from civil society organizations.

== Lompo chairmanship ==
Garba Lompo was elected as the commission's Chairperson in 2001, and re-elected in 2004. His tenure was marked by foreign criticism of the work of the commission.

When Timidria, an anti-slavery group, attempted to organize a ceremony to liberate 7,000 slaves in Inatès in early 2005, the CNDHLF said that the group should instead characterize the ceremony as a "campaign for public awareness and popularisation of the law criminalising slave practices". At the ceremony, held on 4–5 March 2005, CNDHLF President Lompo was present and stated that "any attempt to free slaves in the country [remained] illegal and unacceptable"; he also said that "any person celebrating a slave liberation [would] be punished under the law". In its report released on 28 April 2005, the CNDHLF stated that slavery did not exist in the area and accused those who spread the slavery "rumours" of secretly working to "tarnish the image of the country" and deter donors. In its recommendations, the CNDHLF report called for the arrest of Timidria leaders (two of them were arrested on the day of the report's release), the dissolution of the organization and the freezing of its bank accounts. Lombo urged the Interior Ministry to "ensure a more regular monitoring of NGOs and associations activities in the country".

Later in 2005, Lompo said that "slavery doesn't exist" in Niger. The remaining social relationships that could be classified as slavery were effectively voluntary arrangements, based on tradition and continued because the slaves felt "at ease with the master", according to Lompo.

On 14 September 2006, Lompo addressed the United Nations General Assembly meeting on the High-level Dialogue on International Migration and Development. He announced on 9 November 2007 that the government had initiated a probe to determine whether slavery actually existed or "whether these are just baseless allegations".

After Ali Madou, the Vice-President of the CNDHLF, was kidnapped by Tuareg rebels in mid-May 2008, Lombo called for the rebels to release Madou immediately and without conditions.

By 2007 government-established National Commission on Human Rights and Fundamental Liberties operated without government interference but lacked resources, was generally considered ineffective, and issued few reports or recommendations. During 2007 new commission elections were held but controversy over the selection process continued, with representatives of two human rights associations contesting each other's participation. The government attempted to mediate the controversy, but one of the groups requested the Supreme Court's arbitration, while representatives of the second group had assumed seats on the commission.

== Djibo chairmanship ==
On 4 September 2008 a new CNDHLF leadership was elected with Mamoudou Djibo, an academic, becoming Chairperson, Aissata Adamou Zakaria, a former magistrate becoming vice-chair. Lompo Garba was excluded from standing for chair due to a two-term limit. Anne Marie Douramane, a jurist, was elected Rapporteur General and Oumarou Lalo Keita, a journalist was elected assistant Rapporteur. Former ambassador Boubacar Bello was elected Treasurer.

== See also ==
- Human Rights in Niger
