= European Group of National Human Rights Institutions =

The European Group of National Human Rights Institutions was one of four regional networks of national human rights institutions within the International Co-ordinating Committee of NHRIs (the ICC). It has ceased to exist and was superseded by the European Network of National Human Rights Institutions (ENNHRI) in 2013.

Until the formal establishment of the European Network of National Human Rights Institutions, the European Group co-ordinated joint action by NHRIs across the Council of Europe region, including by way of conferences and thematic working groups.

== See also ==
- European Network of National Human Rights Institutions
- International Co-ordinating Committee of National Human Rights Institutions
- Asia Pacific Forum of National Human Rights Institutions (APF)
- Network of National Institutions in the Americas
- Network of African National Human Rights Institutions (NANHRI)
