= Valton Bend =

Barbadian magistrate and ombudsman

Ombudsman of Barbados
- In office 2009–2017

Personal details
- Born: c. 1949
- Died: October 11, 2023 Barbados
- Occupation: Magistrate, public official

Valton Bend (c. 1949 – October 11, 2023) was a Barbadian magistrate and public official who served as the Ombudsman of Barbados from 2009 to 2017.

Bend joined the Barbadian public service in 1978 and became a magistrate in 1984. During his judicial career, he served as acting chief magistrate before being appointed Ombudsman in 2009.

Bend also appeared in the 2007 Barbadian film Hit for Six, portraying the character Marvin Dalrymple.

He died on October 11, 2023, at the age of 74.
