= Network of National Institutions in the Americas =

The Network of National Institutions in the Americas is one of four regional groups of national human rights institutions (NHRIs) within the global network, the International Co-ordinating Committee of NHRIs (the ICC). The Americas group, which largely consists of ombudsman agencies rather than multi-member human rights commissions, is currently chaired by the National Human Rights Commission of Mexico, which represents the region on the ICC Bureau.

== Members ==
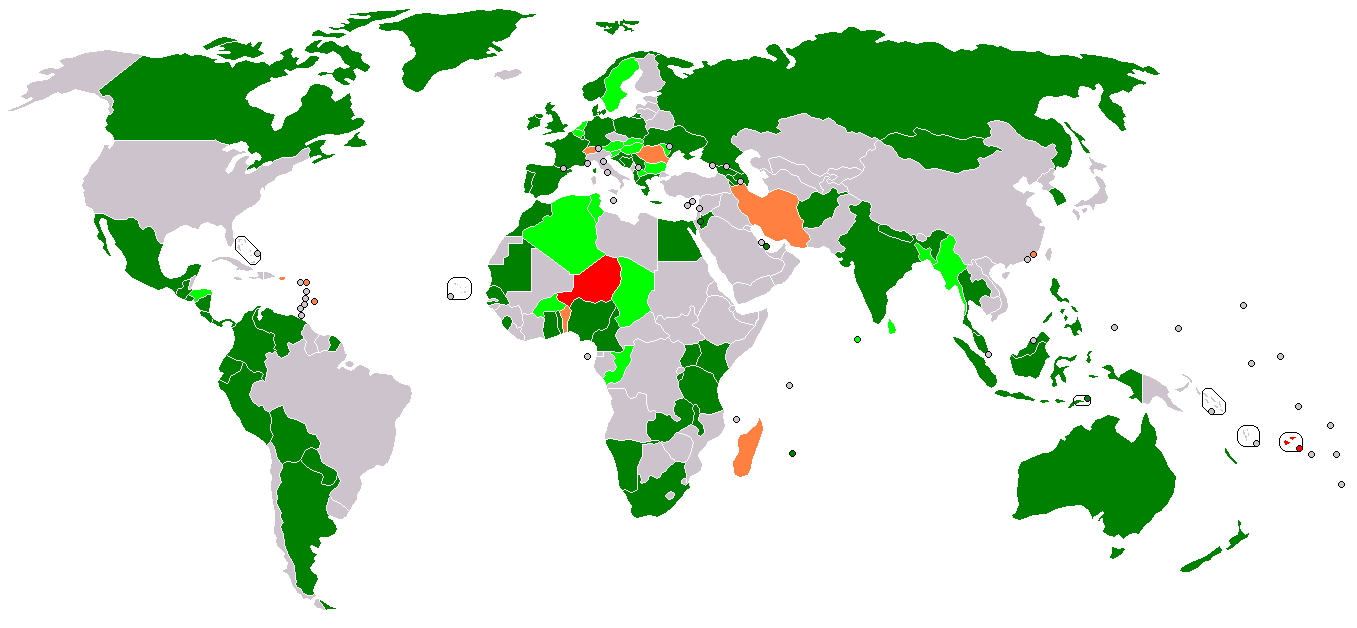
Map showing all International Coordinating Committee members, not only those from the Americas: NHRI full members, class A NHRI associate members, class B NHRI members, class C NHRI suspended members

The full members of the Network are those national institutions deemed by the ICC to be fully compliant with the Paris Principles, so accredited with "A status":

Argentina
Defensoría del Pueblo de la Nación Argentina (Ombudsman)
Bolivia
Defensor del Pueblo
Canada
Canadian Human Rights Commission
Colombia
Ombudsman's Office of Colombia
Costa Rica
Defensoria de los Habitantes
Ecuador
Defensor del Pueblo de la República de Ecuador
El Salvador
Procuraduría de Defensa de los Derechos Humanos (El Salvador)
Guatemala
Procurador de los Derechos Humanos (Guatemala)
Honduras
Comisionado Nacional de los Derechos Humanos (Honduras)
Mexico
National Human Rights Commission (Mexico)
Nicaragua
Procuraduría para la Defensa de los Derechos Humanos de Nicaragua
Panama
Defensoría del Pueblo de la República de Panamá
Paraguay
Defensoría del Pueblo de la República del Paraguay
Peru
Defensoría del Pueblo - Ombudsman (Peru)
Venezuela
Defensoría del Pueblo

== Other human rights institutions in the Americas ==
The following institutions are not "A" accredited by the ICC but are potentially eligible for consideration (except, under current ICC rules, Puerto Rico). Some participate alongside Network members in regional events, particularly those organized through the Ibero-American Federation of Ombudsmen (FIO).

Antigua and Barbuda
Office of the Ombudsman
Barbados
Office of the Ombudsman (Barbados)
Belize
Office of the Ombudsman (Belize)
Guyana
Office of the Ombudsman (Guyana)
Haiti
Office de la Protection du Citoyen
Jamaica
Office of the Public Defender (Jamaica)
Puerto Rico
Oficina del Procurador del Ciudadano
Saint Lucia
Office of the Parliamentary Commissioner (St Lucia)
Trinidad and Tobago
Office of the Ombudsman of Trinidad and Tobago

== See also ==
- Asia Pacific Forum of National Human Rights Institutions (APF)
- European Group of National Human Rights Institutions
- Human rights
- International Co-ordinating Committee of National Human Rights Institutions
- Network of African National Human Rights Institutions (NANHRI)
