= International Ombudsman Institute =

- Abbreviation: IOI
- Formation: 1978
- Type: International organisation
- Purpose: Cooperation of independent Ombudsman institutions
- Headquarters: Vienna, Austria
- Region served: Global
- Members: 200+ institutions
- Official language: English, French, Spanish
- President: Vacant
- Main organ: Board of Directors
- Website: www.theioi.org

The International Ombudsman Institute (IOI), established in 1978, is a global organisation for over 200 independent ombudsman institutions operating on a local, regional and national level in over 100 countries.

== History ==
The IOI's current President Nashieli Ramírez Hernández (President of the Human Rights Commission of Mexico City) is scheduled to hold office for four years from 2024 to 2028. Hernández was appointed after the immediate former President Chris Field, also then the Ombudsman of Western Australia, stepped down in March 2024 only part-way through his term amidst an investigation into his own conduct as WA's Ombudsman. (Field later also resigned from that position after Western Australia's Corruption and Crime Commission found that he had engaged in serious misconduct.) Werner Amon, Chair of the Austrian Ombudsman Board, is the IOI's Secretary General since July 2019.

The role of Ombudsman institutions is to protect the people against the violation of rights, abuse of powers, unfair decisions and maladministration. In this sense, Ombudsman institutions are national human rights institutions. They play an increasingly important role in improving public administration while making the government's actions more open and its administration more accountable to the public.

In its effort to focus on good governance and capacity building, the IOI supports its members in a threefold way: training, research and regional subsidies for projects. The IOI is organised in six regional chapters (Africa, Asia, Australasia & Pacific, Europe, the Caribbean & Latin America and North America) and has three working languages (English, French and Spanish).

The General Secretariat is located in Vienna (Austria) and is run by the Austrian Ombudsman Board (Volksanwaltschaft) since 2009.

== National human rights institutions ==
Many Ombudsman institutions operate as national human rights institutions (NHRI). Others work as mediators. In 2020, the General Assembly of United Nations "recognized that the role of Ombudsman and mediator institutions, whether they are national human rights institutions or not, is the promotion and protection of human rights and fundamental freedoms, promotion of good governance and respect for the rule of law". Also in 2020, a report to the Secretary General of UN General Assembly, encouraged "the Ombudsman, mediator and other national human rights institutions to request accreditation by the Global Alliance of National Human Rights Institutions."

== Presidents ==
- Ulf Lundvik, Sweden, 1984
- Bernard Frank, United States, 1985–
- Stephen Owen, Canada, 1990
- Sir John Robertson, New Zealand, 1992–1994
- Vacancy, Argentina
- Marten Oosting, Netherlands, −1999
- Sir Brian Elwood, New Zealand, 1999–2002
- Clare Lewis, 2002–2004
- Bill Angrick, United States, 2004–2010
- Mats Melin, Sweden, President in 2010
- Dame Beverley Wakem, New Zealand, November 2010 – October 2014
- John Walters, Namibia, October 2014 – November 2016
- Peter Tyndall, Ireland, November 2016 – May 2021
- Chris Field, Australia, May 2021 – March 2024
- Nashieli Ramírez Hernández, Mexico, March 2024 - current

== See also ==
- Global Alliance of National Human Rights Institutions (GANHRI) - coordinates the relationship between national human right institutions and the United Nations human rights system
- National human rights institution – Type of independent state-based institution with the responsibility to broadly protect and promote human rights in a given country
