= Network of African National Human Rights Institutions =

The Network of African National Human Rights Institutions (NANHRI) is one of four regional groupings within the global network, the Global Alliance for National Human Rights Institutions (GANHRI). NANHRI promotes the establishment of national human rights institutions throughout Africa, and supports co-operation and training to strengthen and develop the monitoring, promotion, protection and advocacy work of African NHRIs.

== Members ==
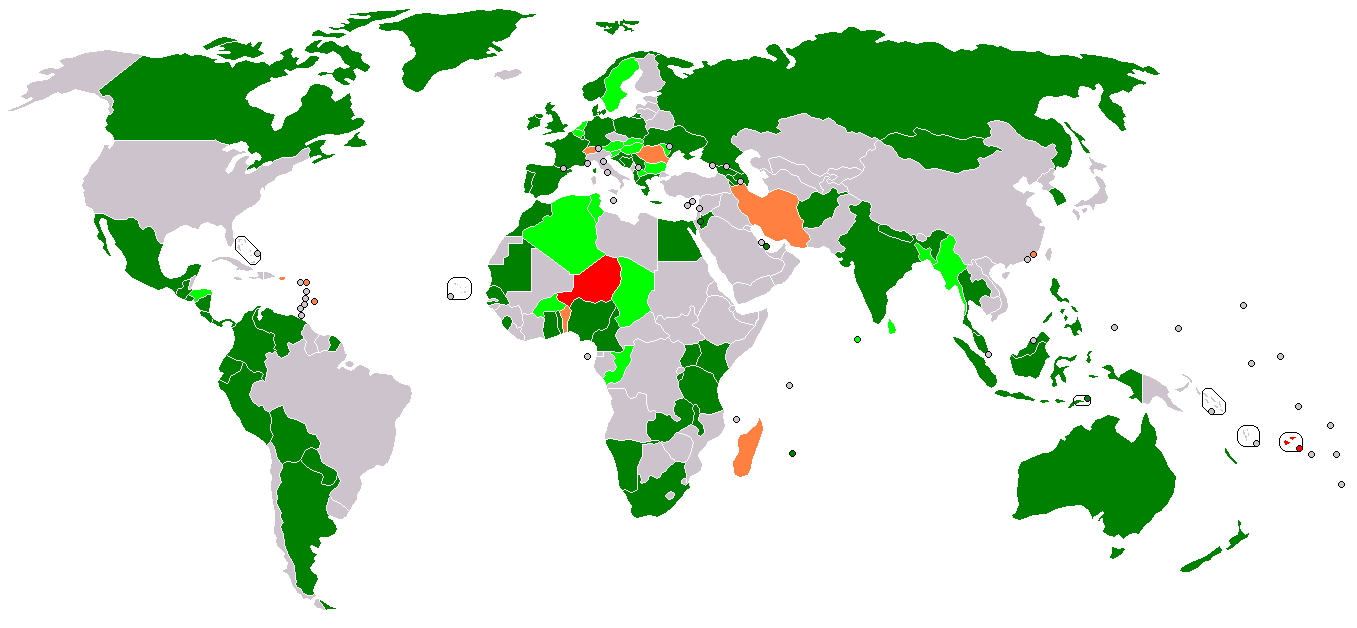
Map showing all Global Alliance for National Human Rights Institutions members, not only those from Africa: NHRI full members, class A NHRI associate members, class B NHRI members, class C NHRI suspended members

The following NANHRI members are (as of 30 May 2010) accredited with full "A status" by the ICC, hence deemed to be fully compliant with the Paris Principles:

Egypt
National Council for Human Rights (Egypt)
Ghana
Commission on Human Rights and Administrative Justice (CHRAJ)
Kenya
Kenya National Commission on Human Rights (KNCHR)
Malawi
Malawi Human Rights Commission
Mauritius
National Human Rights Commission (Mauritius)
Morocco
Human Rights Advisory Council (Morocco)
Namibia
Office of the Ombudsman (Namibia)
Niger
Nigerien National Commission on Human Rights and Fundamental Liberties
Rwanda
National Commission for Human Rights (Rwanda)
Senegal
Senegalese Committee for Human Rights
South Africa
South African Human Rights Commission (SAHRC)
Tanzania
Commission for Human Rights and Good Governance (Tanzania)
Togo
National Human Rights Commission (Togo)
Uganda
Uganda Human Rights Commission (UHRC)
Zambia
Permanent Human Rights Commission (Zambia)

The following NANHRI members are (as of 30 May 2010) do not have full "A status":

Algeria
National Human Rights Commission of Algeria
Angola
Provedor de Justiça e de direitos (Angola)
Bénin
Bénin Human Rights Commission
Burkina Faso
National Human Rights Commission of Burkina Faso
Cameroon
National Commission on Human Rights and Freedoms
Chad
Chad National Human Rights Commission
Democratic Republic of the Congo
National Human Rights Observatory (DR Congo)
Republic of the Congo
National Human Rights Commission (Republic of the Congo)
Ethiopia
Ethiopian Human Rights Commission
Gabon
National Human Rights Commission (Gabon)
Madagascar
National Human Rights Commission (Madagascar)
Mali
Commission nationale consultative des droits de l’homme (Mali)
Mauritania
Commissariat aux Droits de l’Homme, a la Lutte contre la Pauvreté et l’Insertion (Mauritania)
Nigeria
National Human Rights Commission (Nigeria)
Sierra Leone
Human Rights Commission of Sierra Leone
Sudan
Southern Sudan Human Rights Commission
Tunisia
Higher Committee on Human Rights and Fundamental Freedoms (Tunisia)

== See also ==
- Human rights in Africa
- Asia Pacific Forum of National Human Rights Institutions (APF)
- European Group of National Human Rights Institutions
- Network of National Institutions in the Americas
- Human Rights Commissions
- African Commission on Human and Peoples' Rights
