= Hit for Six =

Hit for Six may refer to:

- A cricket expression that refers to when the batsman hits a six off the bowling
- Hit for Six (album), a music album by Consumed
- Hit for Six (film), a 2007 Barbadian film about cricket, starring Rudolph Walker
