= National human rights institution =

Type of independent state-based institution

A national human rights institution (NHRI) is an independent state-based institution with the responsibility to protect and promote human rights in a country. The Office of the United Nations High Commissioner for Human Rights (OHCHR) aids these bodies, providing advisory and support services, and facilitates access to United Nations (UN) treaty bodies and other committees. There are over one hundred such institutions, about two-thirds assessed by peer review as compliant with the United Nations standards set out in the Paris Principles. Compliance with the Principles is the basis for accreditation at the UN, which, uniquely for NHRIs, is not conducted directly by a UN body but by a sub-committee of the Global Alliance of National Human Rights Institutions (GANHRI) called the Sub-Committee on Accreditation. The secretariat to the review process (for initial accreditation, and reaccreditation every five years) is provided by the National Institutions and Regional Mechanisms Section of the OHCHR.

NHRIs can be grouped together into two main categories: human rights commissions and ombudspersons. While most ombudspersons have their powers vested in a single person, human rights commissions are led by multi-member boards, often representative of various societal groups. NHRIs are sometimes set up to deal with specific issues such as discrimination, although the Paris Principles requires they should be bodies with broad responsibilities. Specialised national institutions also exist in many countries to protect the rights of a particular vulnerable group such as ethnic and linguistic minorities, indigenous peoples, children, refugees, persons with disabilities, or women.

National human rights institutions under the Paris Principles have an explicit and broad human rights mandate including promotion and protection functions. This can include research, documentation and training and education in human rights issues, while the ombudsman model tends to handle complaints about administrative deficiencies. While all human rights violations are maladministration, ombudsmen generally deal with few human rights violations. In most countries, a constitution, a human rights act, or institution-specific legislation establish national human rights institutions. The degree of independence of these institutions depends upon national law, and best practice requires a constitutional or statutory basis rather than (for example) a presidential decree. A nation's human rights institution are also referred to by the Vienna Declaration and Programme of Action and the Convention on the Rights of Persons with Disabilities.

== Role ==
Many countries establish special commissions to ensure laws and regulations protecting human rights are applied effectively. These commissions are often composed of members from diverse backgrounds, and with interest, expertise, or experience in human rights. Human rights commissions primarily protect those within the state's jurisdiction against discrimination or mistreatment, and defend civil liberties and other human rights. Some investigate alleged violations of constitutional rights or international human rights treaties.

An essential role of many human rights commissions is to receive and investigate complaints alleging human rights abuses violating national law. Many human rights commissions rely on conciliation or arbitration for investigation and complaint resolution. Human rights commissions may be granted authority to impose legally binding outcomes on parties to a complaint. If no special tribunal has been established, the commission may transfer unresolved complaints to normal courts for final determination. NHRIs usually deal with human rights issues by directly involving a public authority. In relation to non-state entities, some national human rights institutions may address:

- grievances or disputes involving certain kinds of company (for instance state-owned enterprises, private companies providing public services, or companies operating at federal level).
- only certain types of human rights issue (for instance non-discrimination or labour rights).
- complaints or disputes raising any human rights issue and involving any company.

Additionally they may promote and protect the responsibilities of the state and the rights of the individual by:

- advising to the state of its international and domestic human rights obligations and commitments.
- receiving, investigating and resolving human rights complaints.
- educating and publishing for all sections of society (particularly minority groups such as refugees).
- monitoring human rights in the state and its subsequent actions.
- engaging with the international community to advocate for human right recommendations and to raise pressing issues for the state.

Promoting and educating about human rights may involve informing the public of the commission's roles, sparking discussions on important human rights issues, providing counselling services and meetings, or distributing human rights publications. Another important function is reviewing a government's human rights policy to detect shortcomings and suggest improvements. This often includes proofing draft legislation, or policies. The degree of enforcement of institution's recommendations or rulings depends on the society's human rights climate.

Human rights commissions may monitor the state's compliance with local and with international human rights laws and recommend changes. The realization of human rights cannot be achieved solely through legislation and administrative arrangements; therefore, commissions are often charged with improving community awareness of human rights. The Paris Principles obliges national human rights institutions to "[prepare] reports on the national situation with regard to human rights in general, and on more specific matters"; this is usually done in annual status reports.

== Objectives ==
The International Council on Human Rights Policy reported that NHRIs are established: in countries experiencing conflict (usually internal like South Africa, Ireland, or Spain), or in response to claims of serious human rights abuses. NHRIs may be established as visual institutional security, as a body that is seen to be dealing with prevalent issues (such as seen in Mexico and Nigeria), or finally to underpin and consolidate other human rights protections (such as in Australia and New Zealand). National governments establish institutions reflecting their opinions and cultural identity. The United Nations Commission on Human Rights passed resolutions in 1992, recommending promotion of such institutions by governments without any, and also promoting the reform of those that did. The United Nations Commission took over tasks requiring international involvement. Regional human rights agreements encouraged this development and establishment of human rights institutions as technical assistance was provided through international arrangements (such as the Asia-Pacific Forum of National Human Rights Institutions).

NHRIs in some member states work at the international and regional level, such as in the European Union. They may work to prevent discrimination against minority groups or international crimes, such as torture. The authority and expertise typically held by NHRIs enable them to advocate for equal treatment. They serve as a resource in helping states adhere to international rights standards by offering an impartial perspective and addressing issues at the national level.

Coupled with the United Nations, NHRIs are protecting and providing comprehensive and wide-ranging solutions. However, some states are unwilling to give effect to these sanctions, and the United Nations is unable to conduct the widespread and analytical monitoring of countries. In order to be legitimate, effective, and credible, NHRIs must be independent and effective. One of the most effective tools that NHRIs have is their unique position between the responsibilities of government and the rights of civil society and non-governmental organisations (NGOs). This conceptual space gives NHRIs a positively distinctive role, acting as a different protection service for the people and different tools available to hold the state and other bodies accountable for human rights breaches. However being independent from government and NGOs provides greater difficulty when funding, and working relationships are taken into account. In most countries they receive government funding, and are also created and appointed by a governmental body. This creates somewhat of a parallel obligation and taints the idea of the institutions autonomy and makes it harder to pursue their individual agenda.

== Paris Principles ==
The Paris Principles were conceived at a 1991 conference convened by the United Nations Commission on Human Rights. Although the priorities and structure of them differ from country to country they have core features. Part A.3 of the Paris Principles adopted in March 1993 by the United Nations Commission on Human Rights provides that NHRIs responsibilities are to ratify human rights treaties and cooperation with human rights mechanisms. The workshop recommendations provide a basis for assessing the effectiveness and independence of a NHRI, identifying six key criteria:

- independence from government.
- independence granted from constitution or legislation.
- powers of investigation without referral from a higher authority or receipt of an individual complaint.
- pluralism, allowing them to coexist with the governing body.
- adequate financial and human resources.
- clearly defined and broad mandate to protect and promote universal human rights.

NHRI fully complying with these criteria and demonstrate independence are accredited an "A status", while those only partially fulfilling them receive a "B status". "A status" institutions are allowed to participate in United Nations Human Rights Council discussions and its mechanisms. The Subcommittee on Accreditation determines the "status" of each NHRI, appeals directed to the GANHRI's Chair within 28 days. "C status" institutions are due to non-compliance with the Paris Principles, but may still participate in gatherings as observers. The Committee reviews these decisions every five years, giving the institutions opportunities to show further independence or compliance with the principles. Aiming to be transparent, vigorous and thorough in evaluation, the committee helps institutions earn "A status" and comply with the Paris Principles.

== Global Alliance of National Human Rights Institutions ==
The Global Alliance of National Human Rights Institutions (GANHRI), formerly known as the International Coordinating Committee of National Institutions for the Promotion and Protection of Human Rights (ICC), is a representative body of institutions worldwide. It aims to create effective and independent NHRIs around the world and encourages inter-institutional cooperation. It organises international conferences for NHRIs, helps institutions in need of assistance, and helps governments create NHRIs when requested.

== International Ombudsman Institute ==
NHRIs can deal with a variety of issues including torture, discrimination, environment and employment rights. In addition to human rights commissions they can be constituted or legislated as an ombudsman or a hybrid human-rights ombudsman. The International Ombudsman Institute provides support for national ombudsman institutions for human rights. They are more concerned with state administration processes and so receive and make complaints in regards to systematic or administrative human rights breaches or concerns.

== Global Alliance of National Human Rights Institutions ==
The International Coordinating Committee of NHRIs was established in 1993 with a Bureau composed of one representative from the Americas, Asia Pacific, Africa and Europe. The Coordinating Committee organises an annual meeting and a biennial conference that facilitates and supports NHRI engagement with the United Nations system. At these gatherings NHRIs are able to share their expertise on specific topics and engage with the United Nations Office of the High Commissioner for Human Rights (OHCHR), which acts as a Secretariat of the Coordinating Committee. In order to facilitate NHRI dialogue with civil society the Coordinating Committee also holds an NGO forum. The Coordinating Committee may also be asked by a government to assist in making a new NHRI or to develop on pre existing ones.

The committee's name was changed to Global Alliance of National Human Rights Institutions (GANHRI) in 2016. Not all of the following NHRIs are accredited through GANHRI.

Afghanistan
Afghan Independent Human Rights Commission; suspended by GANHRI since July 2022, as of December 2025
Albania
People's Advocate
Algeria
National Human Rights Commission of Algeria
Angola
Justice and Rights Ombudsman (Provedor de Justiça e de direitos)
Antigua and Barbuda
Office of the Ombudsman
Argentina
Public Defender (Defensoría del Pueblo de la Nación Argentina) (Ombudsman)
Armenia
Human Rights Defender of Armenia
Australia
Australian Human Rights Commission
Austria
Austrian Ombudsman Board
Azerbaijan
Human Rights Commissioner
Bahrain
National Institution for Human Rights
Barbados
Ombudsman
Bangladesh
National Human Rights Commission
Belgium
Centre for equal opportunities and opposition to racism
Vlaams Mensenrechteninstituut
Belize
Office of the Ombudsman
Bénin
Bénin Human Rights Commission
Bermuda
Bermuda Ombudsman
Bolivia
Public Defender (Defensor del Pueblo)
Bosnia and Herzegovina
Human Rights Chamber for Bosnia and Herzegovina (pre-2003 cases)
Human Rights Ombudsman of Bosnia and Herzegovina (current cases)
Bulgaria
Bulgarian Parliamentary Ombudsman
Burkina Faso
National Human Rights Commission of Burkina Faso
Burundi
National Independent Commission on Human Rights (CNIDH)
Cameroon
National Commission on Human Rights and Freedoms
Canada
Canadian Human Rights Commission
Chad
Chad National Human Rights Commission
Colombia
Ombudsman's Office of Colombia
Democratic Republic of the Congo
National Human Rights Observatory (DR Congo)
Republic of the Congo
National Human Rights Commission (Republic of the Congo)
Costa Rica
Defender of the Inhabitants (Defensoria de los Habitantes)
Croatia
Office of the Croatian Ombudsman
Cyprus
National Institute for the Protection of Human Rights
Czech Republic
Public Defender of Rights (Czech Republic)
International Human Rights Commission (IHRC)
Denmark
Danish Institute for Human Rights
Ecuador
Defensoría del Pueblo del Ecuador
Egypt
National Council for Human Rights
El Salvador
Human Rights Procurator (Procuraduría de Defensa de los Derechos Humanos)
Ethiopia
Ethiopian Human Rights Commission
Fiji
Fiji Human Rights Commission
Finland
Human Rights Centre, Human Rights Delegation and Parliamentary Ombudsman
France
Commission nationale consultative des droits de l'homme
Gabon
National Human Rights Commission
Georgia
Office of Public Defender of Georgia
Germany
German Institute for Human Rights (Deutsches Institut für Menschenrechte)
Ghana
Commission on Human Rights and Administrative Justice CHRAJ
Great Britain (UK)
Equality and Human Rights Commission (EHRC) – see also Scotland
Greece
National Human Rights Commission (Εθνική Επιτροπή για τα Δικαιώματα του Ανθρώπου)
Guatemala
Procurator for Human Rights (Procurador de los Derechos Humanos)
Guyana
Office of the Ombudsman
Haiti
Office de la Protection du Citoyen
Honduras
National Human Rights Commissioner (Comisionado Nacional de Derechos Humanos)
Hong Kong
Equal Opportunities Commission (Hong Kong)
Hungary
Commissioner for Fundamental Rights
India
National Human Rights Commission (India)
Indonesia
National Commission on Human Rights (Komnas HAM)
Iran
High Council for Human Rights; unaccredited by GANHRI as of December 2025
Ireland
Irish Human Rights and Equality Commission
Italy
Commissione per i Diritti Umani
Jamaica
Office of the Public Defender (Jamaica)
Jordan
National Centre for Human Rights (Jordan)
Kazakhstan
Commissioner for Human Rights
Kenya
Kenya National Commission on Human Rights (KNCHR)
Korea, Republic of
National Human Rights Commission of Korea
Kosovo (Under United Nations Administration via UN Resolution 1244)
Ombudsperson Institution in Kosovo
Kyrgyzstan
Ombudsman of the Kyrgyz Republic
Latvia
Rights' Defender
Lithuania
The Seimas Ombudsmen
Luxembourg
Consultative Commission of Human Rights (Luxembourg)
Madagascar
National Human Rights Commission (Madagascar)
Malawi
Malawi Human Rights Commission
Malaysia
Human Rights Commission of Malaysia (SUHAKAM)
Maldives
Human Rights Commission of the Maldives
Mali
Commission nationale consultative des droits de l’homme (Mali)
Mauritania
Commissariat aux Droits de l’Homme, a la Lutte contre la Pauvreté et l’Insertion (Mauritania)
Mauritius
National Human Rights Commission (Mauritius)
Mexico
National Human Rights Commission (Mexico)
Moldova
Centre for Human Rights of Moldova
Mongolia
National Human Rights Commission (Mongolia)
Montenegro
Office of the Ombudsman of the Republic of Montenegro
Morocco
National Human Rights Council
Myanmar (Burma)
Myanmar National Human Rights Commission
Namibia
Office of the Ombudsman (Namibia)
Nepal
National Human Rights Commission (Nepal)
Netherlands
Netherlands Institute for Human Rights
New Zealand
Human Rights Commission (HRC)
Nicaragua
Human Rights Procurator (Procuraduría para la Defensa de los Derechos Humanos)
Niger
Nigerien National Commission on Human Rights and Fundamental Liberties
Nigeria
National Human Rights Commission (Nigeria)
North Macedonia
Human Rights Ombudsman of Macedonia
Northern Ireland (UK)
Northern Ireland Human Rights Commission (NIHRC)
Norway
Norwegian National Human Rights Institution
Palestine
Palestinian Independent Commission for Citizen's Rights
Pakistan
National Commission for Human Rights, Pakistan
Panama
Defensoría del Pueblo de la República de Panamá
Paraguay
Defensoría del Pueblo de la República del Paraguay
Peru
Public Defender (Defensoría del Pueblo)
Philippines
Commission on Human Rights (Philippines)
Poland
Commissioner for Civil Rights Protection (ombudsman)
Portugal
Provedor de Justiça
Puerto Rico
Oficina del Procurador del Ciudadano
Qatar
National Committee for Human Rights (Qatar)
Romania
Ombudsman (Avocatul Poporului)
Russia
Commissioner for Human Rights (Russia); unaccredited by GANHRI as of December 2025
Rwanda
National Commission for Human Rights (Rwanda)
Saint Lucia
Office of the Parliamentary Commissioner (St Lucia)
Samoa
Office of the Ombudsman
Scotland (UK)
Scottish Human Rights Commission (SHRC) – see also Great Britain
Senegal
Senegalese Committee for Human Rights
Serbia
Office of the Ombudsman of the Republic of Serbia
Sierra Leone
Human Rights Commission of Sierra Leone
Slovakia
Slovak National Centre for Human Rights
Slovenia
Human Rights Ombudsman (Slovenia)
South Africa
South African Human Rights Commission (SAHRC)
Commission for the Promotion and Protection of the Rights of Cultural, Religious and Linguistic Communities (CRL Rights Commission)
Commission for Gender Equality (CGE)
Public Protector
South Sudan
South Sudan Human Rights Commission (SSHRC)
Spain
Defensor del Pueblo (Ombudsman)
Sri Lanka
National Human Rights Commission (Sri Lanka)
Sudan
National Human Rights Commission (Sudan)
Sweden
Parliamentary Ombudsman (JO)
Children's Ombudsman (Sweden) (BO)
Discrimination Ombudsman (Sweden) (DO)
Switzerland
Federal Commission against Racism (Switzerland)
Taiwan
National Human Rights Commission (Taiwan)
Tanzania
Commission for Human Rights and Good Governance (Tanzania)
Thailand
National Human Rights Commission (Thailand)
Timor Leste
Office of the Provedor for Human Rights and Justice (Timor Leste)
Togo
National Human Rights Commission (Togo)
Trinidad and Tobago
Office of the Ombudsman of Trinidad and Tobago
Tunisia
Higher Committee on Human Rights and Fundamental Freedoms (Tunisia)
Turkey
Human Rights and Equality Institution of Turkey
Ombudsman Institution
Uganda
Uganda Human Rights Commission (UHRC)
Ukraine
Ombudsman in Ukraine
United Kingdom
see Great Britain; Northern Ireland; Scotland
United States
United States Commission on Civil Rights
Uzbekistan
Authorized Person of the Oliy Majlis of the Republic of Uzbekistan for Human Rights (Ombudsman)
Venezuela
Defensoría del Pueblo (Venezuela)
Zambia
Permanent Human Rights Commission (Zambia)

== Regional groupings ==
- International Ombudsman Institute
- Network of African National Human Rights Institutions (NANHRI)
- Asia Pacific Forum of National Human Rights Institutions (APF)
- European Group of National Human Rights Institutions
- Network of National Institutions in the Americas

== Sub-national human rights institutions ==
Australia

Anti-Discrimination Board of New South Wales
Victorian Equal Opportunity and Human Rights Commission
Equal Opportunity Commission (South Australia)
Equal Opportunity Commission (Western Australia)
Anti-Discrimination Commission Queensland
Office of Anti-Discrimination Commissioner (Tasmania)
Human Rights Commission (Australian Capital Territory)
Northern Territory Anti-Discrimination Commission

Canada

Alberta Human Rights and Citizenship Commission
British Columbia Human Rights Tribunal
Ontario Human Rights Commission

United Kingdom
The three UK bodies (Great Britain, Northern Ireland, Scotland) are listed above as they are each recognised as NHRIs.
Spain
Each Spanish region has its own ombudsman.
South Korea
Provincial and Metropolis level

Provincial Human Rights Promotion Commission (South Chungcheong Province)
Provincial Human Rights Promotion Commission (Gangwon Province)
Seoul Human Rights Commission
Human Rights Ombudsman (Gwangju)

Citizen Council for Human Rights Promotion is advisory council for the Ombudsman

Ulsan Human Rights Commission

Education

Human Rights Commission for Students, Gyeonggi Provincial Office of Education

Human Rights Advocate for Students (Gyeonggi Province)

Human Rights Commission for Students, Seoul Metropolitan Office of Education

Human Rights Advocate for Students (Seoul)

== See also ==
- African Court on Human and Peoples' Rights
- European Court of Human Rights
- Human rights
- Human Rights Commissions
- Inter-American Court of Human Rights
- International human rights instruments
- List of human rights organisations
- Vienna Declaration and Programme of Action
