= National Human Rights Commission (Mongolia) =

National human rights institution

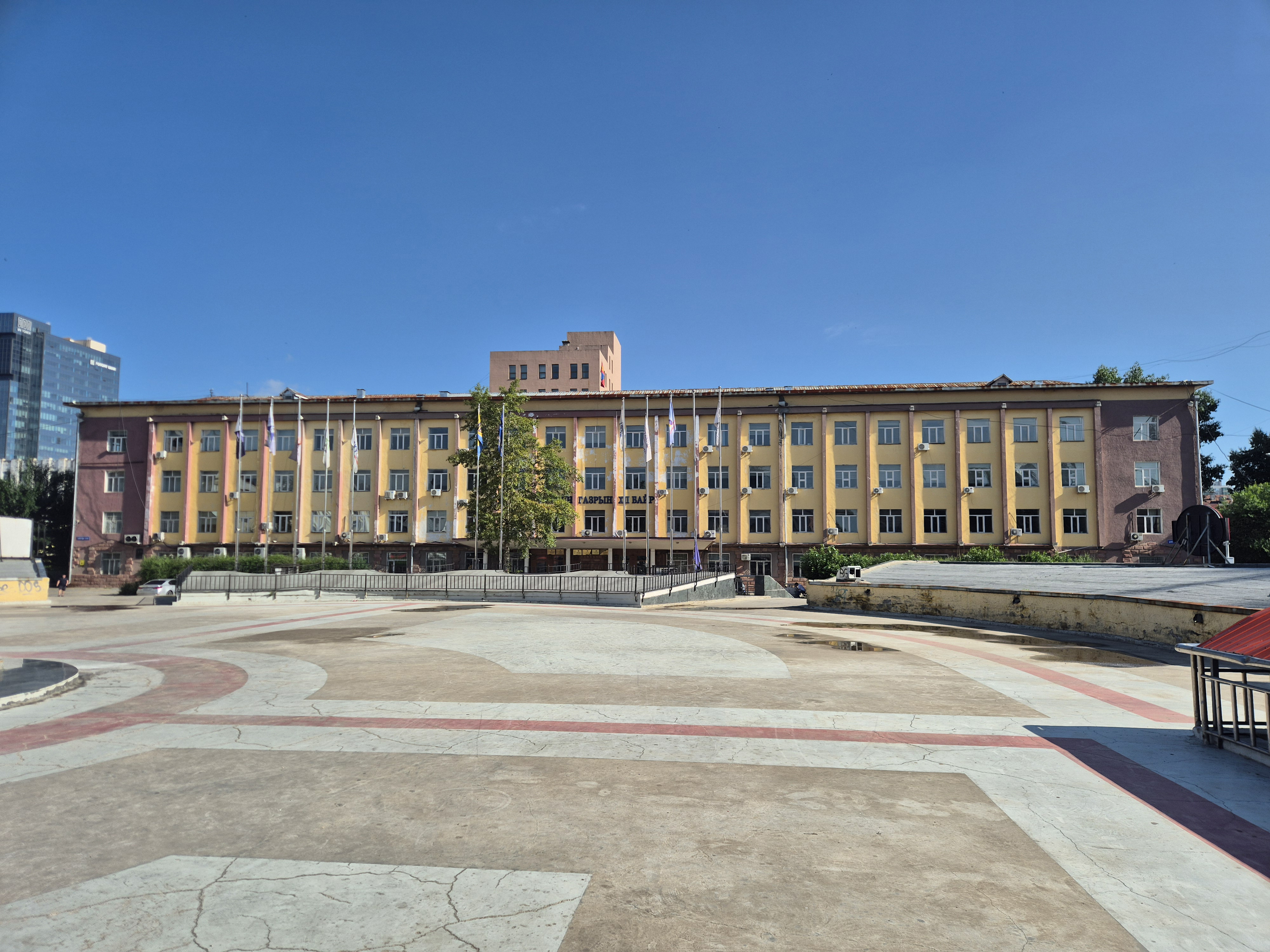
Government Building 12 which houses the commission

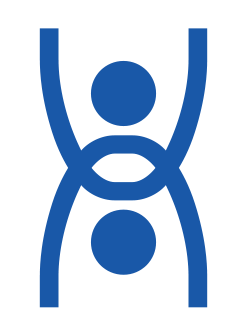
Logo of the National Human Rights Commission of Mongolia

The National Human Rights Commission of Mongolia (Mongolian: Монгол Улсын Хүний Эрхийн Үндэсний Комисс, romanized: Mongol Ulsyn Khünii Erkhiin Ündesnii Komiss; ХЭҮК/KhEÜK) was established under the 2000 Law on the National Human Rights Commission of Mongolia, and commenced operations on 1 February 2001. The Law on the National Human Rights Commission of Mongolia was revised in January 2020.

== Mandate and functions ==
- Delivers proposals and recommendations related to human rights and freedom in Mongolia to competent organizations, officials, and legal entities;
- Delivers proposals on whether drafts of laws or administrative decisions are in conformity with the Constitution, international treaties, and human rights principles;
- Delivers proposals to accede and ratify international human rights treaties and submit reports to the UNHRC and human rights treaty bodies;
- Submits proposals about improving the legislation connected with fulfilling human rights and freedoms to the officials or authorities with a right to initiate legislation;
- Promotes and disseminates human rights education;
- Protects human rights and freedoms;
- Cooperates with governmental, civil society, and media organizations, legal entities, and international organizations;
- Commissions studies on requisite issues by academic and research institutions and NGOs and appoint thematic experts for conclusions;
- Oversees the implementation of the Law on Ensuring Gender Equality, prepares a report, and submits it to the Parliament;
- Oversees the implementation of the Law on Protection of Personal Data, prepares a report, and submits it to the Parliament;
- Oversees the implementation of the duty to ensure, protect and respect human rights and freedoms of government institutions and officials in par with its mandate;
- Prepares the annual Status Report on Human Rights and Freedoms in Mongolia and submits it to the Parliament within the year's first quarter.

The Commission’s main activities include investigations, research and handling complaints. The Commission’s complaints mechanism is available to those complaining of violations of human rights by a public authority or a business. Eligible complainants must be:

- Citizens of Mongolia, either individually or in a group; or
- Foreign citizens and/or stateless persons who are residing in the territory of Mongolia (unless otherwise provided in laws and international treaties of Mongolia); or
- Lawful representatives-parents, caretakers and/or guardians for the persons who do not have full civil law capacity or have some limited or partial capacity; or
- Representatives provided under the law for persons who are considered missing or declared as deceased; or
- Non-profit legal entities can lodge their complaints through their representatives

The Commission will resolve within 30 days from the date of receipt of a complaint, or 60 days where the Chief Commissioner grants an extension for further investigation and enquiry.

Complaints that will not be accepted:

- Criminal and civil cases and/ or disputes, which are at the stage of registration/ inquiry, investigation and/or on trial or have been already decided
- Complaint regarding personal relationship of individuals
- Complaint regarding issues that can be directly decided by relevant official.

If a complaint is not under jurisdiction of the Commission, then it shall be transferred within 3 (three) working days to relevant organization and official

== Commissioners ==
The Commission consists of 7 commissioners: Chairperson, 5 standing commissioners, and a commissioner on the prevention of torture. Current composition of the Commission:

- Ms. Sunjid Dugar, Chief Commissioner
- Ms. Dondov Sangisharav, Commissioner
- Ms. Munkhzul Khurelbaatar, Commissioner
- Mr. Khunan Jargalsaikhan, Commissioner
- Ms. Narantuya Ganbat, Commissioner
- Mr. Enkhbold Batzeveg, Commissioner
- Mr. Tselmen Yadamjav, Commissioner on the prevention of torture

Commissioners in the past:

- Mr. Tserendorj Suren, Chief Commissioner (2001-2007)
- Mr. Dalaijamts Guushir, Commissioner (2001-2007)
- Mr. Dashdorj Jadamba, Commissioner (2001-2013)
- Ms. Solongo, Chief Commissioner (2007-2010)
- Mr. Byambadorj Jamsran, Chief Commissioner (2010-2020)
- Ms. Oyunchimeg Purev, Commissioner (2007-2020)
- Mr. Ganbayar Nanzad, Commissioner (2013-2020)

== Mechanisms and additional mandates established at the National Human Rights Commission of Mongolia under its founding law and other laws ==
=== Human rights defenders' mechanism ===
Mongolia adopted the Law on Legal Status of the Human Rights Defenders on 2 April 2021 and was the first country in Asia to introduce the human rights defender’s mechanism. The Human Rights Defenders Committee is independent and autonomous affiliated with NHRCM, with the mandate to protect human rights defenders and to work associated with civil society and marginalized groups. The Commissioner in charge of human rights defenders chairs the committee and provides unified management and arrangements for the committee’s operation. The Committee exercises the following functions:

- Receives complaints and information about human rights defenders’ rights violations;
- Gathers evidence, documents, and data following the complaints and information received;
- Identifies the necessity to protect human rights defenders and conducts a risk assessment that determines the danger level and risk faced by the human rights defenders, their families, guardians, partners, immediate relatives, and legal representatives.
- Submits the concluding reports to the Commission based on risk assessments;
- Monitors and studies implementation of the Law on the Human Rights Defenders and the situation of human rights defenders, and reflects on the Status Report on Human Rights and Freedoms in Mongolia, and;
- Create a database for complaints and information.

The Committee consists of seven members: four from nonprofit organizations, a commissioner in charge of human rights defenders, and one member each from the Mongolian Bar Association and the Association of Mongolian Advocates.

=== Personal data protection ===
The Parliament adopted the Law on Personal Data Protection on 17 December 2021, effective from 1 May 2022, which concerns collecting, processing, using, and protecting personal data. The commission, by law, provides a recommendation to the data controllers for preventing violations of human rights and freedoms to collecting, processing, and using sensitive personal data, and in addition, oversees concerns about the placement and use of audio, video, and audiovisual equipment and receives, inquiries, and resolves complaints about data controllers’ procedure of collecting and using of personal data. A commissioner in charge of personal data protection has the following powers:

- Oversees the implementation of personal data protection legislation, organizes public awareness and promotion works, in this regard, issues directives and recommendations to the relevant organizations, and gives comments on the draft regulation;
- In the course of collecting, processing, using, and protecting data, the commissioner assumes human rights and freedoms protected by law violated, or conditions for violation may arise after receiving the complaints and information in this regard, or her initiative starts to inquire and delivers directives and recommendations to relevant authorities on the matter;
- Delivers directives and recommendations to the relevant authorities in the area of collecting, processing, using, and protecting sensitive data;
- Receives and reviews data controllers’ registrations on violations detected in collecting, processing, and using data, measures taken to eliminate negative consequences, and delivers recommendations for further consideration;
- Delivers recommendations on preventing human rights and freedoms violations when using automated processing technology for collecting, processing, and using data without human interventions;
- Reflects issues on data protection, violations, and enforcement of the data owner’s rights in the annual Report on Human Rights and Freedom in Mongolia.

=== National preventive mechanism (NPM) ===
The Commissioner in Charge of the Prevention of Torture started to exercise his duty of preventing torture and other cruel, inhuman, or degrading treatment or punishment on 3 June 2022. The Commissioners and other public officials are prohibited from influencing and interfering with the activities of the Commissioner in Charge of the Prevention of Torture, and the Commissioner shall submit and publish the Report of the Prevention of Torture to the Standing Committee of Legal Affairs of the Parliament within the first quarter of every year.

=== The Powers of the Commissioner in charge of the prevention of torture ===
The Commissioner exercises the following powers in preventing torture and other cruel, inhuman, or degrading treatment or punishment:

- Accesses and conducts inquiries in all places and at any time;
- Delivers recommendations and comments on whether draft laws or decisions of governmental organizations conform with the principle of prevention of torture;
- Acquires all kinds of information relating to a person whose freedoms are limited;
- To be provided security while working at all places;
- Documents conditions of all places using hardware;
- Transfers cases with elements of torture to the relevant competent authority;
- Collaborates with non-profit legal entities and other organizations for prevention of torture, mutual information exchange, and regularly inform the public;
- Represents national preventive mechanism abroad and at home;
- Appoints and dismisses the head of the torture prevention unit;
- Deals with torture prevention unit’s internal arrangements, and;
- Adopts torture prevention unit’s internal regulations.

The following functioning of the Commissioner in charge prevention of torture:

- Conducts inquiries to study any forms of limitation of human rights and freedoms or reasons and conditions of the system which creates torture in all places without any voluntary movement of the person;
- describe the harmful effects of torture to the public and raise awareness on the right to be free from torture to public officers and citizens;
- Conducts research on the prevention of torture, prepares books, informational materials, curriculum, and handbooks, and involves nonprofit organizations in which, and;
- Engages regularly with media on the prevention of torture.

== Secretariat ==
Under to the Law on the National Human Rights Commission of Mongolia, the Commission has a Secretariat. The Secretariat of the Commission was established on 20 February 2001. The rules and regulations of the Secretariat are adopted by the Chief Commissioner, and the staff and salary fund are included in the budget approved by the Parliament of Mongolia. Staff members of the Secretariat are civil administrative servants. The Secretariat primarily aims at providing professional and methodological assistance to the Commissioners to exercise their powers.

== Civil society board ==
The Commission has the Civil society board to support its activities. The Board has pluralistic members from human rights nonprofit organizations, lecturers, and researchers from academic institutions and universities.
