= Asia Pacific Forum =

The Asia Pacific Forum (APF) is one of four regional networks of national human rights institutions (NHRIs) within the International Co-ordinating Committee of NHRIs. The APF formerly accredited NHRIs for compliance with the United Nations' Paris Principles, but now acknowledges the accreditation decisions of an ICC sub-committee on which the APF has one of the four (regional) seats.

The APF is unique among the four regional networks in having close working relations with non-governmental organisations in its region.

== Members ==
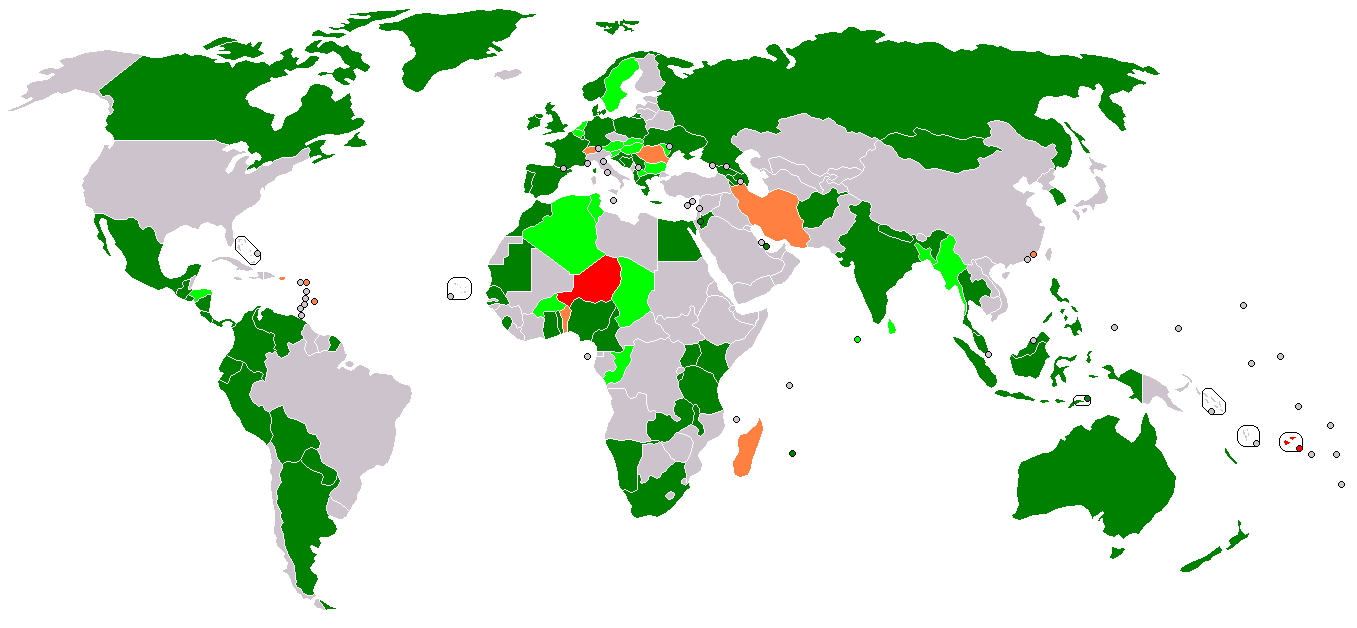
Map showing all International Coordinating Committee members, not only those from Asia and the Pacific: NHRI full members, class A NHRI associate members, class B NHRI members, class C NHRI suspended members

The full members of the APF (as of December 2011) are the following national institutions deemed to be fully compliant with the Paris Principles, and holding A status ICC accreditation:

Afghanistan
Afghan Independent Human Rights Commission
Australia
Australian Human Rights Commission
India
National Human Rights Commission
Indonesia
National Commission on Human Rights (Komnas HAM)
Jordan
National Centre for Human Rights
Korea, Republic of
National Human Rights Commission of Korea
Malaysia
Human Rights Commission of Malaysia (SUHAKAM)
Mongolia
National Human Rights Commission
Nepal
National Human Rights Commission
New Zealand
Human Rights Commission
Palestine
The Independent Commission for Human Rights
Philippines
Commission on Human Rights (Philippines)
Qatar
National Committee for Human Rights
Thailand
National Human Rights Commission
Timor Leste
Office of the Provedor for Human Rights and Justice

The following B status NHRIs are eligible for full membership when they demonstrate compliance with the Paris Principles:

Bangladesh
National Human Rights Commission of Bangladesh
Maldives
Human Rights Commission of the Maldives
Sri Lanka
National Human Rights Commission

The following C status NHRIs are in the APF region but are not compliant with the Principles and are thus ineligible for membership:

Hong Kong
Hong Kong Equal Opportunities Commission
Iran
Islamic Human Rights Commission

In addition:

Fiji
The Fiji Human Rights Commission was suspended from the ICC (hence the APF) in 2007 over its attitude to the previous year's military coup, and scheduled for special review of its then A-status accreditation; in April 2007 it resigned from the ICC.

== See also ==
- International human rights law
- International human rights instruments
