= Global Alliance of National Human Rights Institutions =

Global network of national human rights institutions

The Global Alliance of National Human Rights Institutions (GANHRI; known until 2016 as the International Coordinating Committee of National Human Rights Institutions or International Coordinating Committee, abbreviated ICC) is a global network of national human rights institutions (NHRIs) which coordinates the relationship between NHRIs and the United Nations human rights system, and is unique as the only non-UN body whose internal accreditation system, based on compliance with the 1993 Paris Principles, grants access to UN committees. Institutions accredited by the Subcommittee for Accreditation (SCA) of GANHRI with "A status", meaning full compliance with the Paris Principles, are usually accorded speaking rights and seating at human rights treaty bodies and other UN organs, mainly to the Human Rights Council. GANHRI representatives often present statements on behalf of individual NHRIs or the regional groups.

GANHRI is constituted as a non-profit entity under Swiss law, and has one member of staff representing it at the United Nations Office at Geneva. Secretariat support is provided to GANHRI by the National Institutions and Regional Mechanisms (NIRM) Unit of the Field Operations and Technical Cooperation Division of the Office of the United Nations High Commissioner for Human Rights (OHCHR). Additional work devolves on the NHRI elected to chair the network, currently chaired since 2016 by Beate Rudolf from the German Institute for Human Rights, and on the regional chairs of GANHRI's four regional networks.

GANHRI holds annual general meetings (usually in Geneva in March, coinciding with the UN Human Rights Council session) and a biennial thematic international conference; the tenth conference, hosted in 2010 by the Scottish Human Rights Commission, was on the theme of business and human rights. The last International Conference to date was held in Merida (Mexico) in October 2015 and focused on the Sustainable Development Goals and on the topic of: "What Role for National Human Rights Institutions?"

== The Sub-Committee on Accreditation ==
The peer review process for initial accreditation, and re-accreditation every five years, is managed by a subcommittee consisting of one A status NHRI representative from each of the regional networks. According to the accreditation status document released in July 2022, there were a total of 129 institutions that have been accredited by the GANHRI. 89 of those NHRIs were accredited with "A status" by the GANHRI, and are thus entitled to vote or hold office in the GANHRI or its regional groups; those with lower status (30 B status, meaning not fully compliant with the Paris Principles, and 10 of the now discontinued C status meaning not compliant) can only participate as observers.

The SCA process examines NHRIs' legal, structural, and procedural independence. The designation and findings given to NHRIs through this peer- review process are used by governments to take such steps as may be necessary to obtain and retain A status as an indication of their compliance with national human rights and the rule of law. A status NHRIs are also afforded enhanced recognition and access by the UN to its human rights mechanisms in their own right, giving the SCA an exceptional status within the UN framework. This includes speaking rights before the Human Rights Council under Human Rights Council Resolution 16/21, UN Doc A/HRC/RES/16/21 (12 April 2011). Since 1998, and through the issuance of bi-annual accreditation reports since 2006, the SCA has made developed the understanding the Paris Principles by applying them to the actual situations of NHRIs. Since 2006, the SCA has published general observations to elaborate on the contents of the Paris Principles.

There are three forms of review by the Sub-Committee: First accreditation, periodic re-accreditation, or special review. All accredited NHRIs are expected to go through periodic re-accreditation. Failure to apply for re-accreditation may result in suspension of accreditation status. Applicants for first or periodic accreditation must submit a "statement of compliance with the Paris Principles".

== GANHRI Statute ==
GANHRI (and previously the International Coordinating Committee) has had a statute since 2008. The GANHRI statute sets its purpose as follows: " GANHRI is the global association of NHRIs which promotes and strengthens NHRIs to operate in line with the Paris Principles and provides leadership in the promotion and protection of human rights." (Article 5) A large portion of the Statute (Articles 10-23) deals with the accreditation of NHRIs by the Sub-Committee on Accreditation. The Statute also provides for the 4 regional NHRI groupings (Article 31), as well as for General Assemblies, votings and duties of members.

== NHRIs and Classification ==
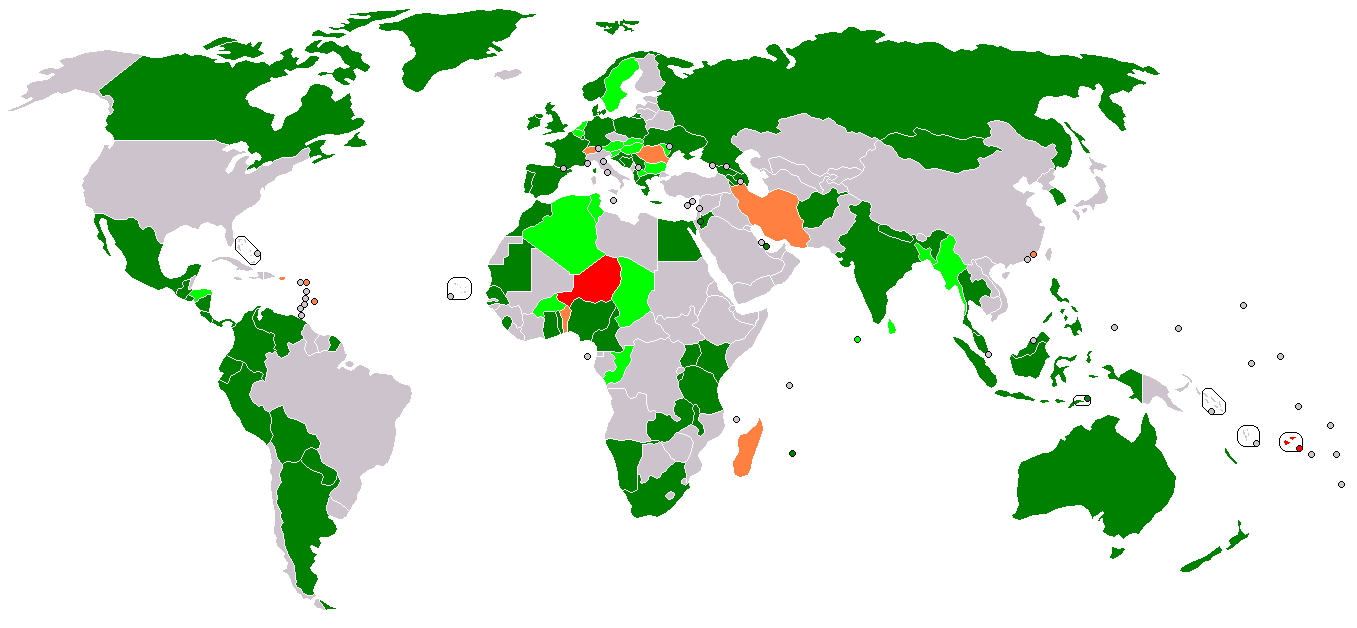
Map showing all International Coordinating Committee members: Full Members (Class A) Associate Members (Class B) Members (Class C) Suspended Members

The full members of the ICC (Class A) (as of December 2011) are national institutions deemed to be fully compliant with the Paris Principles.

The associate members of the ICC (Class B) are eligible for full membership when they demonstrate compliance with the Paris Principles.

Class C NHRIs are not compliant with the Paris Principles and are thus ineligible for membership.

=== Regional Groupings ===
- Network of African National Human Rights Institutions (NANHRI)
- Asia Pacific Forum of National Human Rights Institutions (APF)
- European Network of National Human Rights Institutions (ENNHRI)
- Network of National Institutions in the Americas
