= Paris Principles (human rights standards) =

United Nations General Assembly resolution adopted in 1994

The Paris Principles were defined at the first International Workshop on National Institutions for the Promotion and Protection of Human Rights held in Paris on 7–9 October 1991. They were adopted by the United Nations Human Rights Commission by Resolution 1992/54 of 1992, and by the UN General Assembly in its Resolution 48/134 of 1993. In addition to exchanging views on existing arrangements, the workshop participants drew up a comprehensive series of recommendations on the role, composition, status and also functions of national human rights institutions (NHRIs). These built on standards previously adopted by the 1978 Geneva Seminar on National and Local Institutions for the Promotion and Protection of Human Rights’, which produced the ‘Guidelines on the Structure and Functioning of National and Local Institutions for the Promotion and Protection of Human Rights’. The 1993 Paris Principles regulate to the status and functioning of national institutions for the protection and promotion of human rights known as National Human Rights Institutions.

== Paris Principles Requirements for NHRIs ==
The Paris Principles list a number of roles and responsibilities for national human rights institutions:

- The institution shall monitor any situation of violation of human rights which it decides to take up.
- The institution shall be able to advise the government, the parliament and any other competent body on specific violations, on issues related to legislation and general compliance and implementation with international human rights instruments.
- The institution shall independently engage with regional and international organizations.
- The institution shall have a mandate to educate and inform in the field of human rights.
- Some institutions are given a quasi-judicial competence.

Compliance with the Paris Principles is the central requirement of the accreditation process that regulates NHRI access to the United Nations Human Rights Council and other bodies. This is a peer review system operated by a subcommittee of the Global Alliance of National Human Rights Institutions (GANHRI) called the Sub-Committee on Accreditation. The Sub-Committee reviews NHRIs across a range of criteria, with independence from the state being the most important aspect of its reviews. Independence may be demonstrated through compliance with the Paris Principles, as interpreted by the Sub-Committee in its General Observations. Reviews by the Sub-Committee for Paris Principles' compliance examine NHRIs' enabling law, selection and appointment process for leadership, financial and administrative autonomy, and their human rights mandate, in addition to their practice as human rights promoters and protectors.

== See also ==
- European Court of Human Rights
- Global Alliance of National Human Rights Institutions
- Human rights
- Human rights commission
- International human rights instruments
- National human rights institution
