= Global Campus of Human Rights =

European-based research institute

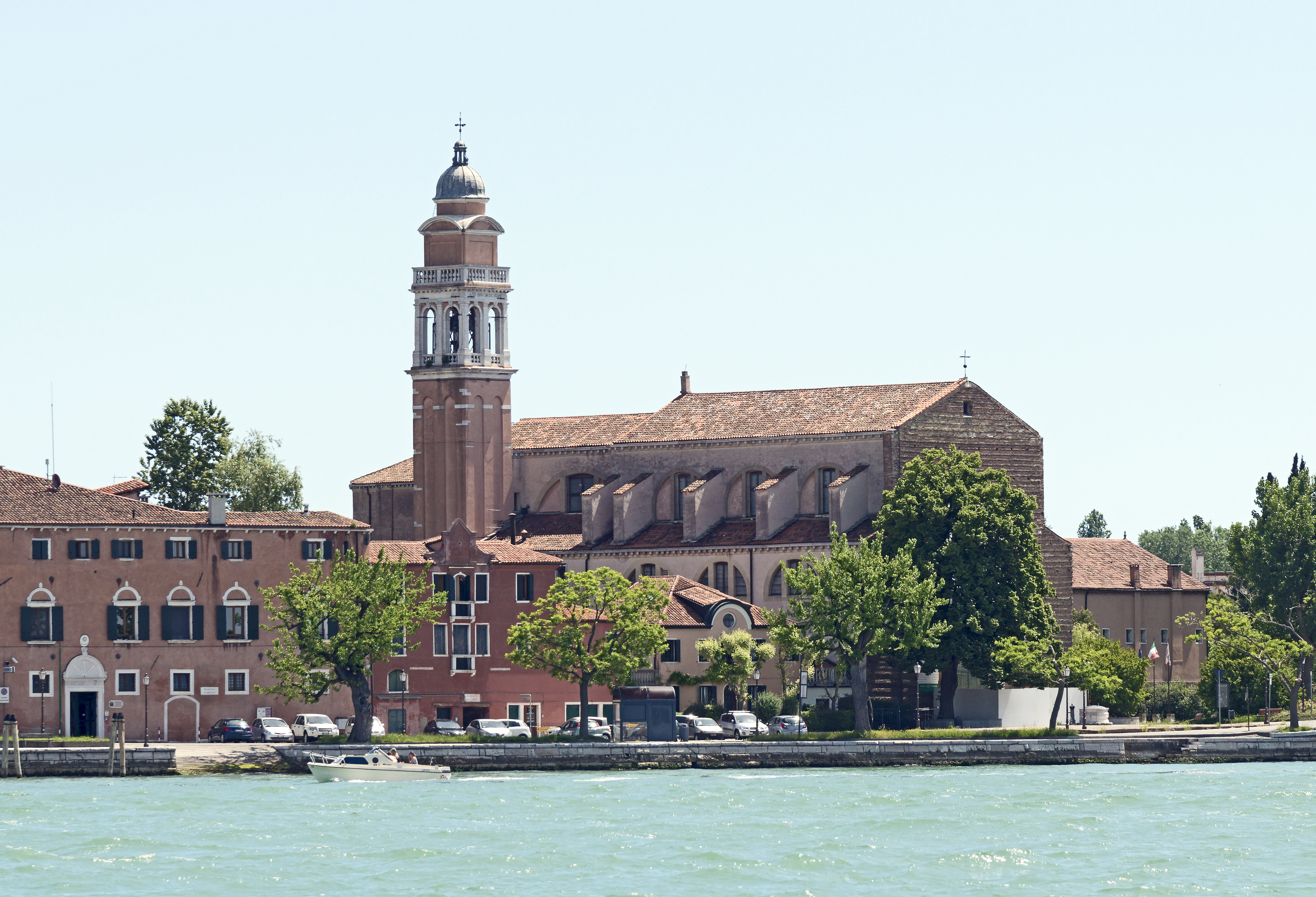
- Type: Higher Education
- Established: 1997
- Parent institution: European Union
- Academic staff: Faculty: (±) 100 including administratives
- Students: (±) 100
- Location: Riviera San Nicolò 26 Lido di Venezia, Venice, 30126, Italy; 45.427862°N 12.380603°E
- Campus: Monastery of San Nicolò al Lido
- Language: English Language
- Website: EIUC.ORG

The Global Campus of Human Rights (GC) is a worldwide network of over 100 universities, supported by the European Union, dedicated to promoting human rights and democracy through specialized higher education, research and advocacy. It brings together eight regional programmes across the world to train future human rights defenders and professionals. It succeeded in 2019 the European Inter-University Centre and its head office is housed in the Monastery of San Nicolò al Lido which has been made available by the Municipality of Venice, Italy. In 2019, the Global Campus of Human Rights integrated into its governance 6 non-European universities: Mahidol University (Thailand), the National University of San Martin (Argentina), Saint Joseph University of Beirut (Lebanon), the State University of Yerevan (Armenia), the University of Pretoria (South Africa) and the University of Sarajevo (Bosnia and Herzegovina).

== Administration ==
- Prof. Veronica Gomez, GC President (2019-)
- Prof. Zdzislaw Kedzia, EIUC President (2016-2019)
- Prof. Dr. Horst Fischer, EIUC President (2002-2016).
- Prof. Dr. Manfred Nowak, EIUC Secretary General (2016-2019).
- Prof. Florence Benoît-Rohmer, EIUC Secretary General (2009-2016).
- Prof. Ria Wolleswinkel, E.MA Chairperson (since 2013).

=== E.MA Programme Directors ===
- Dr. Anja Mihr (2006-2008).
- Dr. Pietro Sullo (2013-2015).
- Dr. Andraž Zidar (2015-2016).
- Prof. George Ulrich (2001-2004; 2016-2021).
- Dr. Orla Ní Cheallacháin (from 2021).

== Consortium ==
University	Country	Academics Past & Present
University of Nottingham	United Kingdom	Prof. Jeff Kenner
Queen's University Belfast	United Kingdom	Prof. Brice Dickson
Maastricht University	The Netherlands	Dr. Ria Wolleswinkel; Prof. Fons Coomans
Utrecht University	The Netherlands	Prof. Dr. Anja Mihr; Prof. Antoine Buyse; Dr. Marjolein van den Brink; Katherine Fortin; Prof. Jenny Goldschmidt; Dr. Brianne McGonigle; Dr. Alexandra Timmer; Dr. Tom Zwart.
Lund University	Sweden	Prof. Karol Nowak; Dr. Gregor Noll; Dr. Göran Melander; Dr. Mats Tjernberg; Dr. Ulrika Andersson; Dr. Alejandro Fuentes; Dr. Radu Mares; Dr. Ulf Maunsbach; Dr. Christoffer Wong; Dr. Maria Green.
Uppsala University	Sweden	Dr. Anna-Sara Lind; Dr. Rebecca Stern; Dr. Lotta Lerwall; Prof. Jane Reichel.
University of Seville	Spain	Prof. Carmen Márquez Carrasco; Dr. Pablo Antonio Fernández-Sánchez; Prof. Pablo Gutiérrez Vega; Dr. Luis Rodríguez-Piñero; Ms. Beatriz Fernandez.
University of Deusto	Spain	Prof. Felipe Gómez; Dr. Kevin Villanueva; Prof. Cristina Churruca; Dr. Dolores Morondo; Dr. Joana Abrisketa Uriarte; Dr. Jaime Oraá; Dr. Eduardo Ruiz Vietez; Dr. Trinidad L. Vicente Torrado; Dr. Cristina de la Cruz.
University of Ljubljana	Slovenia	Prof. Petra Roter
Comenius University in Bratislava	Slovakia	Prof. JUDr. Mária Patakyová; Doc. Tomáš Gábriš; Doc. Erik Láštic; PhD. Branislav Fábry; PhD. Marián Giba, PhD. Lýdia Tobiášová.
University of Bucharest	Romania	Prof. Iulia MOTOC; Prof. Radu CARP; PhD Margareta MATACHE; PhD Liana IONITA
University of Coimbra	Portugal	Prof. José Manuel Pureza; Prof. Vital Moreira; Prof. Jónatas Machado; Prof. Benedita Urbano; Carla Marcelino Gomes; Ana Filipa Neves; Catarina Gomes
New University of Lisbon	Portugal	Prof. Maria Teresa Pizarro Beleza; Prof. Helena Pereira de Melo; Prof. Nuno Piçarra
Adam Mickiewicz University	Poland	Prof. Zdisław Kędzia; Dr. Agata Hauser; Prof. Roman Wieruszewski; Ms. Beata Zieba.
University of Malta	Malta	
University of Strasbourg	France	Prof. Jean-Paul Jacqué; Dr. Florence Benoît-Rohmer; Prof. J.B. Marie; Prof. Yvan Boëv.
University of Montpellier	France	Prof. Fédéric Sudre; Prof. Christophe Maubernard; Prof. Gérard Gonzalez; Prof. Claire Vial; Prof. Katarzyna Blay-Grabarczyk.
Aristotle University of Thessaloniki	Greece	Prof. Dimitra Papadopoulou; Dr Baka, Aphrodite; Dr Figgou Evangelia; Prof. Georgopoulos Alexandros; Prof. Hadjiconstantinou Costas; Dr Kalokairinou Eleni; Dr Kesidou Anastasia; Dr Matthaioudakis Marina; Prof. Mavroskoufis Dimitrios; Dr Nika-Sampson Evanthia; Dr Nikolakakis Dimitrios.
Panteion University	Greece	Prof. Maria Daniella Marouda; Prof. Emeritus Stelios Perrakis; Prof. Grigoris Tsaltas
Ruhr-University Bochum	Germany	Prof. Hans-Joachim Heintze; Prof. Pierre Thielbörger; Dr. Markus Moke; Prof. Adelheid Puttler; Charlotte Lülf; Katharina Behmer; Dr. Johannes Richert
University of Hamburg	Germany	Prof. Hans Giessmann; Dr. Patricia Schneider; Dr. Götz Neuneck; Dr. Michael Brzoska.
University of Luxembourg	Luxembourg	Prof. Jean-Paul Lehners; Dr. Jörg Gerkrath; Dr. Robert Harmsen; Dr. Herwig Hofmann; Dr. Harlan Koff; Dr. René Leboutte; Dr. Lukas Sosoe.
University of Vilnius	Lithuania	Prof. Dainius Žalimas; Dr. Vygantė Milašiūtė; Dr. Indrė Isokaitė.
University of Latvia	Latvia	Dr. Arturs Kucs; Dr. Anita Rodiņa; Dr. Annija Kārkliņa; Dr. Kristine Dupate; Dr. Arnis Buka; Dr. Christoph Schewe; Dr. Edmunds Broks; Dr. Māris Burbergs.
University of Padua	Italy	Dr. Angela Melchiorre; Prof. Paolo de Stefani; Léonce Bekemans; Paola Degani; Pietro De Perini; Giuseppe Giordan; Costanza Margiotta; Marco Mascia; Lorenzo Mechi; Vincenzo Pace; Antonio Papisca; Paolo Piva; Claudia Pividori.
Ca' Foscari University of Venice	Italy	Dr. Sara De Vido; Prof. Adalberto Perulli; Prof. Fabrizio Marrella; Prof. Vania Brino; Prof. Lauso Zagato.
University College Dublin	(Republic of Ireland) Ireland	Dr. Graham Finlay; Dr. Vincent Durac; Dr. Andy Storey; Dr. Alexa Zellentin
National University of Ireland, Dublin	(Republic of Ireland) Ireland	Dr. Liam Thornton
National University of Ireland, Galway	(Republic of Ireland) Ireland	Prof. Michael O'Flaherty; Dr. John Reynolds; Prof. Ray Murphy; Dr. Shane Darcy; Dr. Ekaterina Yahyaoui Krivenko; Mr. Peter Fitzmaurice; Dr.Ciara Smyth; Dr. Kathleen Cavanaugh; Prof. Michael A. Newton; Mr. Rick Lines; Dr. Aoife Duffy; Dr. Anita Ferrara
Eötvös Loránd University	Hungary	Prof. Gabor Halmai; Dr. Tamás Hoffmann; Dr. Csilla Lehoczky Kollonay; Dr. Zsolt Körtvélyesi; Dr. Kriszta Kovács; Dr. Balázs Majtényi; Dr. Júlia Mink; Dr. Orsolya Salát
University of Helsinki	Finland	Prof. Jan Klabbers; Dr. Jarna Petman; Dr. Rotem Giladi.
Åbo Akademi University	Finland	Prof. Elina Pirjatanniemi; Mrs. Catarina Krause, Dr. Viljam Engström.
Tartu University	Estonia	Prof. Lauri Mälksoo; Prof. William B. Simons; Researcher Merilin Kiviorg; Prof.René Värk.
University of Southern Denmark	Denmark	Prof. Tim Jensen
Danish Institute for Human Rights	Denmark	Dr. Eva Maria Lassen; Prof. Tim Jensen; Prof. Lars Binderup.
University of Vienna	Austria	Prof. Manfred Nowak; Dr. Christina Binder; Dr. Ursula Kriebaum; Dr. René Kuppe; Dr. Walter Schicho; Dr. Hannes Tretter.
University of Graz	Austria	Prof. Wolfgang Benedek; Dr. Gerd Oberleitner; Dr. Christian Pippan; Prof. DDr. Renate Kicker
KU Leuven	Belgium	Prof. Koen Lemmens; Prof. René Foqué; Dr. Pietro Sullo; Dr. Stephan Parmentier; Prof. Marie-Claire Foblets, Prof. Paul Lemmens; Prof. Frank Verbruggen; Prof. Jan Wouters.
Université libre de Bruxelles	Belgium	Prof. Guy Haarscher
Sofia University	Bulgaria	Prof. Nikolay Natov; Dr. Plamen Pantev; Dr. Mariana Karagyozova; Dr. Radostin Belenski; Dr. Martin Belov; Dr. Vihur Kiskinov.
University of Zagreb	Croatia	Prof. Josip Kregar
University of Cyprus	Cyprus	Prof. Kalliope Agapiou-Josephides; Constandinides Aristotle; Demetriou Kyriakos; Hadjipavlou Maria; Hadjimichael Nikitas; Katsikides Savvas; Loizides Antis; Panagakou Stamatoula; Paraskevas Costas; Tombazos Stavros
Masaryk University	Czech Republic	Prof. Jan Holzer; Mgr. Hubert Smekal

== Non-Consortium Experts ==
The following are experts involved in the E.MA, having helped with teaching or thesis supervising from other institutions:

University	Country	Academics Past & Present
Ludwig Boltzmann Institut für Menschenrechte	Germany	MSc Anna Müller-Funk; Mag. Julia Planitzer.
Pantheon-Sorbonne University	France	Prof. Dominique Carreau.
University of Greenwich	England	Prof. Olga Martín-Ortega.
University of Antwerp	Belgium	Prof. Wouter Vanderhole.
Paris Nanterre University	France	Prof. Antoine Lyon-Caen.
University of Philippines	Philippines	Dr. Kevin Villanueva.
Venice International University	Italy	MSc Prof. Ignazio Musu.
University of Amsterdam	The Netherlands	Prof. Ram Manikkalingam.
Imperial College London	England	Ms. Živa Cotič.
University of Pretoria	South Africa	Prof. Frans Viljoen; Dr. Stuart Casey-Maslen.
University of Lisbon (ISEG)	Portugal	Prof. Sara Falcão Casaca.
University of Bonn	Germany	Dr. Hans-Dieter Heumann.
European Court of Human Rights	France	Róbert Ragnar Spanó.
University of Jaén	Spain	Prof. Víctor Gutiérrez.
National University of General San Martín	Argentina	Prof. Verónica Gómez.
Institute of Studies on Conflicts and Humanitarian Action	Spain	Dr. Jesús Núñez.
Washington College of Law	United States	Dr. Christian Courtis (OHCHR).
Middlesex University	England	Dr. David Keane.
University of Trento	Italy	Ms. Samira Nuhanovic.
Griffith College Dublin	(Republic of Ireland) Ireland	Dr. Tanya Ní Mhuirthile.
Oxfam	Italy	Mr. Francesco Rigamonti.
Humboldt-Viadrina School of Governance	Germany	Prof. Gesine Schwan.
University of Copenhagen	Denmark	Prof. Inger Sjørslev.
Raoul Wallenberg Institute of Human Rights and Humanitarian Law	Sweden	Experts from offices in Europe (Lund, Stockholm, Belarus and Turkey), Asia (Jakarta, Beijing, and Cambodia), Sub-Saharan Africa (Nairobi) and in Middle East and North Africa (Amman).
European External Action Service	European Union	Ms. Ingrid Wetterqvist; Ms. Fridericke Tschampa; Ms. Delphine Skowron.
Peoples' Friendship University of Russia	Russia	Prof. Ekaterina Alisievich.
Lusa News Agency	Portugal	Ms. Sofia Branco.
University of Belgrade - Institute of Comparative Law Belgrade	Serbia	Ms. Milica Matijević.

== E.MA Kosovo Field Trip ==
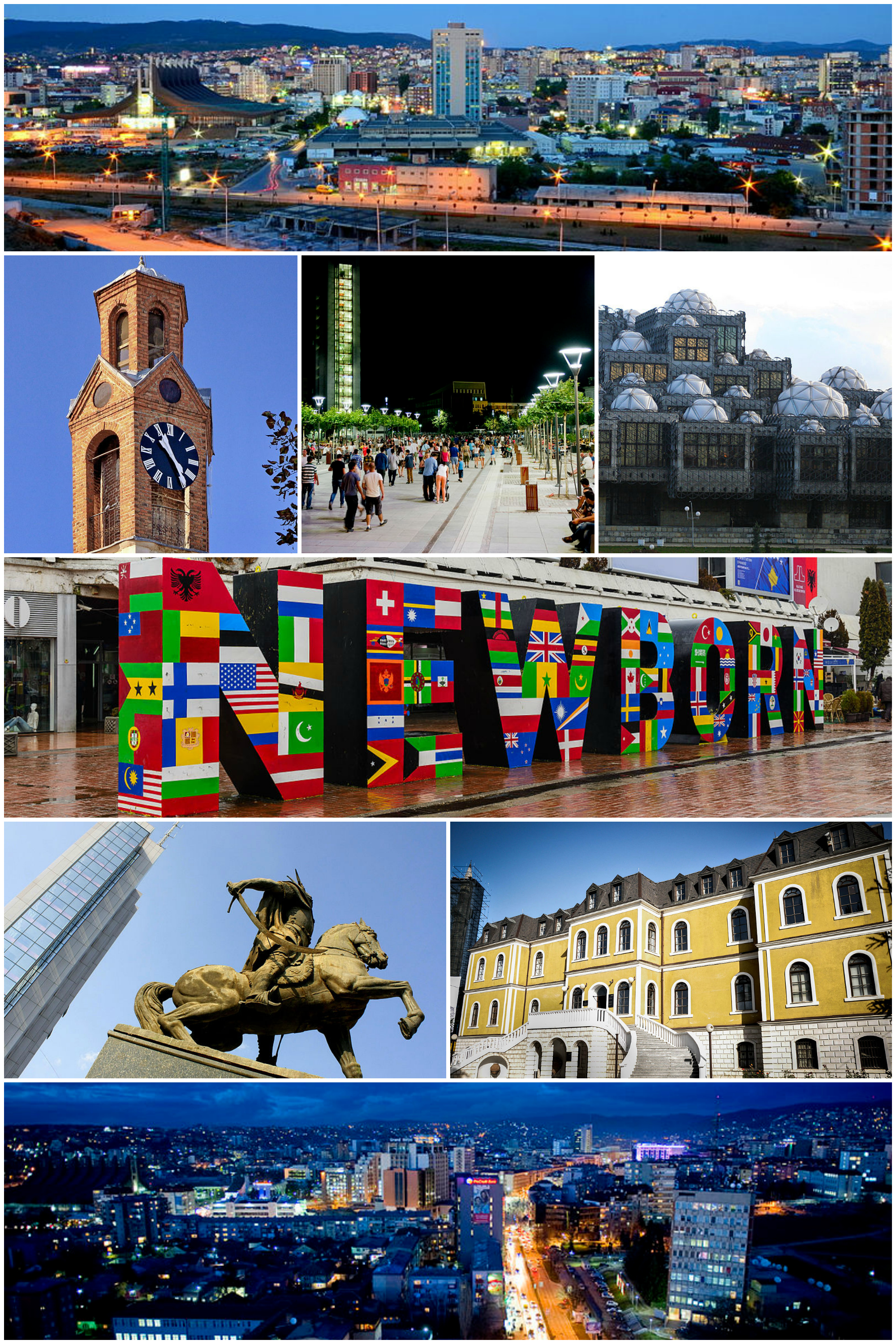
Pristina

Every year this field trip is a pivotal element of the E.MA and has been organized since the Programme's inception, first in Bosnia and Herzegovina (1998-2003) and then in Kosovo since 2004. This part of the course aims at providing deeper insights into the practical tasks, difficulties, and expectations with which human rights officers in the field are faced, and to get a better understanding of the real situation in a post-conflict country. Students usually go to Kosovo in January. The training comprises visits to international organisations and institutions as well as local and regional non-governmental organisations working on the most essential human rights issues, such as property claims, torture related questions, legal advice, women's rights, democratic elections, free media and children's rights. The field trip also consists of short excursions to Priština. Students usually stay with host families and are required to participate in all activities and events organised by the E.MA academic staff, external facilitators from the EU and other experts. The trip has long been coordinated by Marijana Grandits from the University of Vienna and the local representatives at the University of Pristina (Albanian: Universiteti i Prishtinës) whose Faculty of Philology is usually the main meeting point.

== Extracurricular ==
EIUC organises The Venice School of Human Rights for postgraduate students from all academic backgrounds, The Venice Academy of Human Rights for advanced students and worldwide distinguished experts, and a series of advanced training courses dedicated to helping officials of international organisations, field personnel, and E.MA graduates transfer academic and institutional expertise into the public sphere.

== Venue ==
The venue is the Benedictine Monastery of San Nicolò al Lido, situated on the lagoon side of the Lido di Venezia, conceded by the City of Venice in 1998 and became the seat of E.MA in 2002 with the establishment of the EIUC. The monastery was founded in the 11th century and transformed into a Renaissance cloister in the 16th century. After the Republic of Venice suppressed the Benedictine order in 1770, the monastery was re-opened by Franciscan monks for educational purposes.

== International Research Projects ==
The EIUC participates in different international research projects (such as FRAME), it regularly organises high level conferences, seminars and workshops on the latest scientific and academic developments, and it is a member of the Association of Human Rights Institutions (AHRI). In March 2007, EIUC launched a series entitled "EIUC Studies on Human Rights and Democratisation" published by Cambridge University Press.
