= Ermacora =

Ermacora is a surname. Notable people with the surname include:

- Federico Ermacora (born 2000), Italian footballer
- Felix Ermacora (1923–1995), Austrian professor and politician
  - Felix Ermacora Human Rights Award
- Jacinta Ermacora (fl. 2022), Australian politician
- Giovanni Battista Ermacora (1858–1898), Italian physicist and psychic researcher

== See also ==
- Hermagoras
- Ermacora Zuliani
