= Jean Peters (tactical media artist) =

Jean Peters (born 1984) (other pseudonyms: Paul von Ribbeck, Gil Schneider, Sven Ansvar, Jessica Gräber, Conny Runner a.o.) is a German Journalist, Author and Tactical Media Artist born on the Croatian Island Vis. He is known as founding member of the Peng! collective, with which he won the Aachen Peace Prize in 2018., and his investigative journalism at Correctiv, where he is senior reporter. In 2022, he was awarded Reporter of the Year for a joint MeToo investigation. He led the investigation and editorial team at Correctiv on the meeting of right-wing extremists in Potsdam in 2023. He won the journalist of the year award 2024 in Germany.

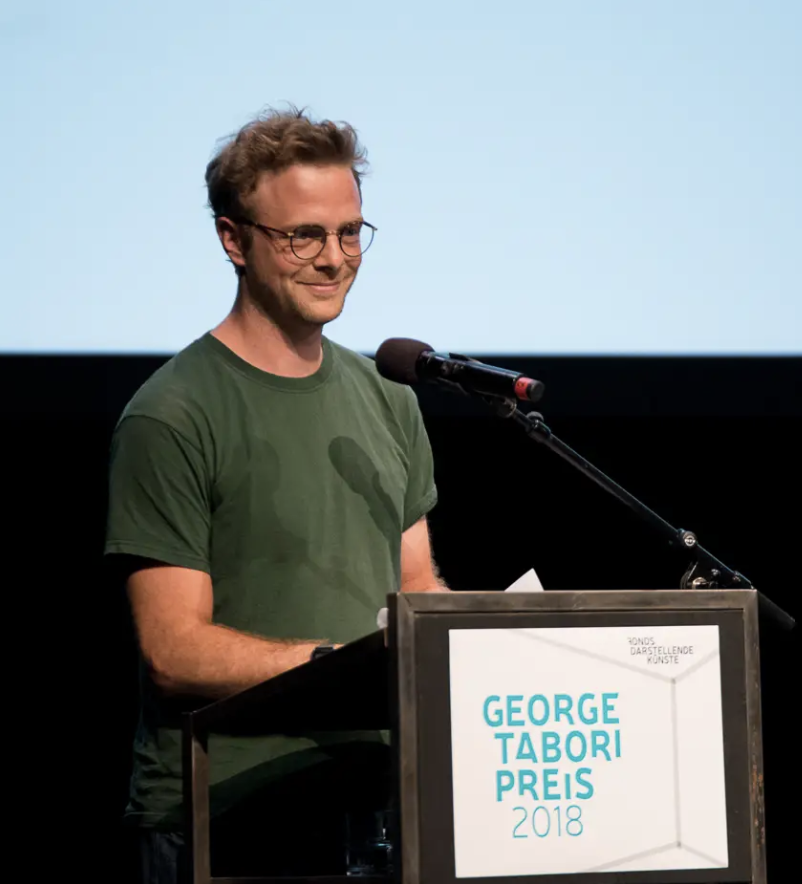
Jean Peters at the George Tabori Prize in 2018 in Berlin.

== Life ==
Peters holds several master's degrees in political science from the Free University Berlin, the School of Oriental and African Studies in London and the Humboldt-Viadrina School of Governance in Berlin. In public, his true identity is not completely clear, since he publicly appears with different names and also changes names in interviews.

He exhibited at the Berlin Biennale, Kampnagel, the Museumsquartier Wien and the Künstlerhaus Wien. In Austria he was investigated by the Office for the Protection of the Constitution and Counterterrorism because of his exhibition. At an exhibition at Kampnagel, the German Ministry of Economics and RWE CEO Rolf Schmitz reacted.

He is lecturer at the University of Cologne, the University of Applied Arts Vienna, the Konrad Wolf Film University of Babelsberg and at the Berliner Festspiele.

His artistic and political actions always received a broad media response. Together with the Peng Collective, he regularly appeared as fake spokesman for different corporations. At the Re:publica 2014, for example, he gave a speech as manager of Google in front of about 3000 visitors and held a press conference at Vattenfall owns headquarters. As a scientist, he captured the stage of an event at Shell. In 2015, together with Peng, he co-founded a drop-out association for people working in the intelligence called Intelexit and called for inner-European smuggling of refugees. Disguised as a clown, he pied the right-extremist politician Beatrix von Storch in 2016. In 2018 he founded the Seebrücke, a movement to decriminalize sea rescue missions.

In 2019, he went undercover to a conference of climate change deniers and, together with the research center Correctiv, he revealed manipulative methods and their connections to the fossil industry.

He is part of the team of artistic directors of the Capital of Culture Hannover and jury member of the Berlinale
