= Menschenrechte =

Menschenrechte is German for human rights.

It is part of the title of several organizations:

- Deutsche Liga für Menschenrechte (German League for Human Rights), a pacifist group
- Initiative fuer Frieden und Menschenrechte (Initiative for Peace and Human Rights), an East German opposition party
- Ludwig Boltzmann Institut für Menschenrechte (Ludwig Boltzmann Institute of Human Rights), a Vienna-based research institute
