= Hermagor =

Hermagor may refer to:

- Hermagor (district), Carinthia, Austria
- Hermagor-Pressegger See, a municipality in the district
- Hermagor a part of the municipality
- all named after Hermagoras of Aquileia (Saint Hermagoras)

== See also ==
- Hermagoras (disambiguation)
