= Mexican Academy =

Mexican Academy may refer to:

- The Academia Mexicana de la Lengua
- The Mexican Academy of Sciences
- The Mexican Academy of Film Arts and Sciences
- The Mexican Academy of Human Rights, an NGO

== See also ==
- Mexico Academy and Central School in New York State
