= Jens Kreisel =

German physicist and academic administrator (born 1969)

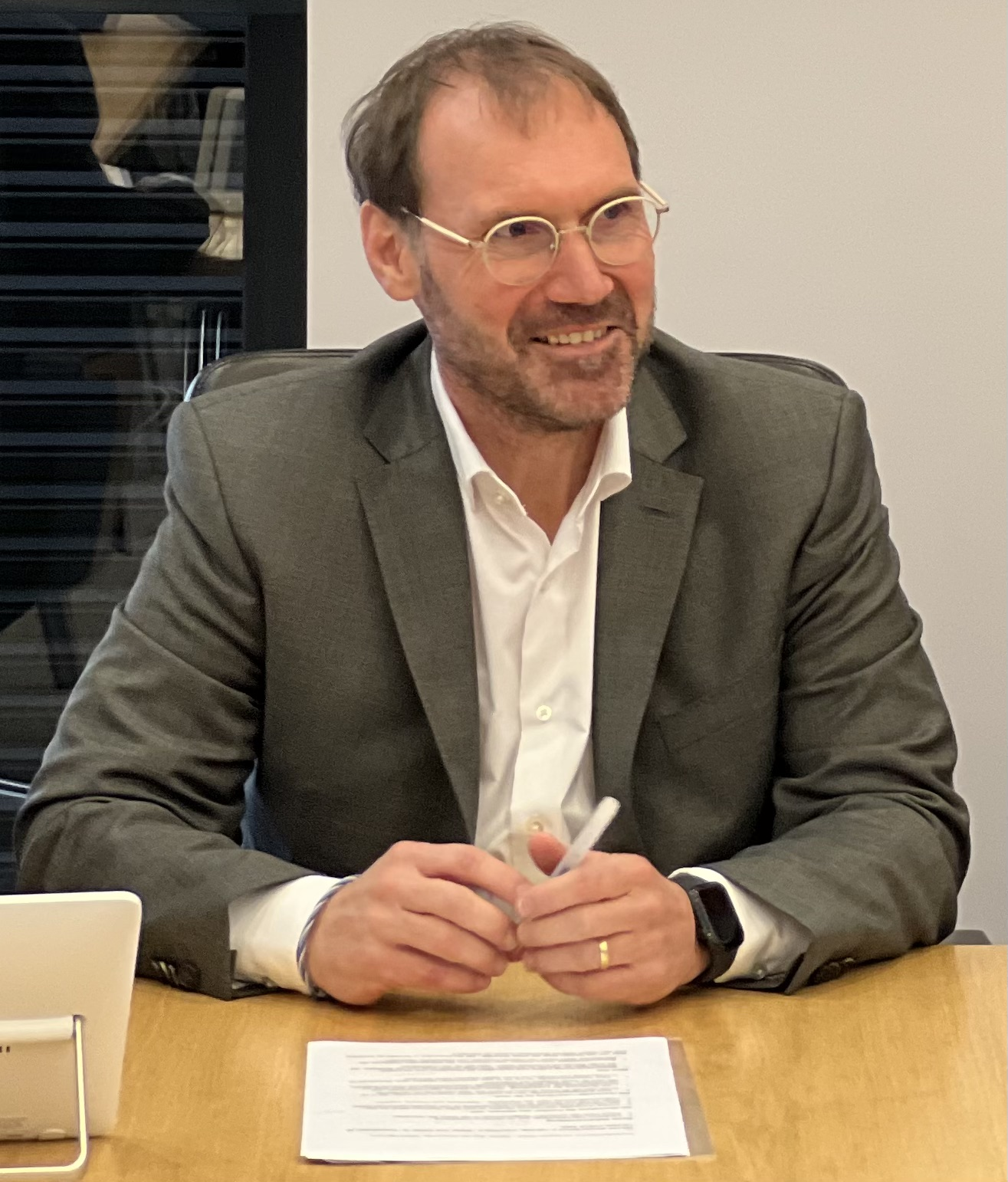

Rector of the University of Luxembourg
- Incumbent
- Assumed office 1 January 2023
- Preceded by: Stéphane Pallage

Personal details
- Born: 1969 (age 56–57) Dortmund, West Germany
- Education: Grenoble Institute of Technology; University of Karlsruhe

Jens Kreisel (born 1969) is a German physicist and currently serves as rector of the University of Luxembourg since 1 January 2023. His research covers functional materials, including phase transitions, spectroscopy and crystal structure–property relationships.

== Early life and education ==
Kreisel was born in Dortmund in 1969. He studied physics and materials science in Karlsruhe, Lyon and Grenoble, and obtained a PhD in materials physics from the Grenoble Institute of Technology in 1999. He subsequently held a postdoctoral fellowship at the University of Oxford.

== Career ==
From 2002 to 2011, Kreisel served as advisor to the President and later Deputy Vice-President for International Relations at Grenoble INP. During 2011–2012, he was a Fellow at the Institute of Advanced Studies, University of Warwick.

In 2012, he moved to Luxembourg to become the founding director of the Materials Research and Technology (MRT) Department at the Luxembourg Institute of Science and Technology (LIST). In 2013 he was awarded a PEARL grant by Luxembourg’s National Research Fund (FNR). The FNR’s 2013 annual report records that €5 million was awarded to his project.

Kreisel joined the University of Luxembourg in September 2018 as Vice-Rector for Research and Full Professor in physics and materials science. He became rector on 1 January 2023.

In May 2025, the University of Luxembourg joined The Guild of European Research-Intensive Universities. In the university’s announcement, Kreisel described the membership as “a centrepiece of our international strategy”.

Kreisel has also spoken publicly about artificial intelligence, digital transformation and sustainability.

== Research and publications ==
Kreisel’s research focuses on functional materials, especially phase transitions and optical spectroscopy. He has authored peer-reviewed publications in journals including Physical Review B, Applied Physics Letters, Nature Reviews Physics and Nature Communications.

=== Selected publications ===
- Hermet, P.; Goffinet, M.; Kreisel, J.; Ghosez, P. (2007). “Raman and infrared spectra of multiferroic bismuth ferrite from first principles.” Physical Review B 75, 220102. doi:10.1103/PhysRevB.75.220102.
- Shvartsman, V. V.; Kleemann, W.; Haumont, R.; Kreisel, J. (2007). “Large bulk polarization and regular domain structure in ceramic BiFeO_{3}.” Applied Physics Letters 90(17), 172115. doi:10.1063/1.2731312.
- Keeble, D. S.; Benabdallah, F.; Thomas, P. A.; Maglione, M.; Kreisel, J. (2013). “Revised structural phase diagram of (Ba_{0.7}Ca_{0.3}TiO_{3})–(BaZr_{0.2}Ti_{0.8}O_{3}).” Applied Physics Letters 102(9), 092903. doi:10.1063/1.4793400.
- Nataf, G. F.; Guennou, M.; Gregg, J. M.; Meier, D.; Hlinka, J.; Salje, E. K. H.; Kreisel, J. (2020). “Domain-wall engineering and topological defects in ferroelectric and ferroelastic materials.” Nature Reviews Physics 2(11), 634–648. doi:10.1038/s42254-020-0235-z.
- Weber, M. C.; Guennou, M.; Evans, D. M.; et al.; Kreisel, J. (2022). “Emerging spin–phonon coupling through cross-talk of two magnetic sublattices.” Nature Communications 13, 443. doi:10.1038/s41467-021-27267-8.

== Honours ==
- PEARL grant, Luxembourg National Research Fund (FNR), 2013.
- Fellow, Institute of Advanced Studies, University of Warwick (2011–2012).
