= Norbert von Kunitzki =

Luxembourgish economist, businessman and university administrator

Norbert von Kunitzki (25 March 1934 – 25 November 2005) was a Luxembourgish expert economist, businessman and university president.

== Biography ==
Born in the Luxembourg City quarter of Pfaffenthal, von Kunitzki was a student of Antwerp University and began working for Arbed in 1954. In 1971 he became CFO of the steel company. He joined as a lecturer at the Centre Universitaire Luxembourg in 1971. In 1984 he became a general director of (as it was called then) Sidmar Ghent (later to become part of Arcelor). He received an honorary doctorate from the University of Ghent in 1991.

In 1994, he became president of the Sidmar group and in 1998 returned to Luxembourg as the president of the Centre Universitaire Luxembourg later to become the University of Luxembourg.

Norbert von Kunitzki was also president of the Consumer Protection Association of Luxembourg and Vice President of Telindus. Furthermore, he was President of l'Institut d'études européennes et internationales du Luxembourg, president of Mobistar, a member of the Board of Systran, a member of the Board of the Luxembourg Philharmonic Orchestra, of the Red Cross and of Europe tower.

Additionally, he had the foresight to serve as Chairman of the Board for EuroSignCard, S.A. an Internet security start-up organization (ESC). This enterprise was positioned to become a trusted third party (TTP) for banking transactions in Luxembourg (c. 2000). ESC was a partner of the American Bankers Association and attempted to create a validation authority for digital certificates used by the banking community.

He died on 25 November 2005 in a climbing accident in Sa Pa, Vietnam.
