= Ali Sadek Abou-Heif =

Egyptian lawyer and human rights scholar

Ali Sadek Abou-Heif (Arabic: علي صادق أبو هيف, romanized: ʻAlī Ṣādiq Abū Hayf) is an Egyptian lawyer and a human rights scholar, described as one of the leading specialists in international public law and human rights in Egypt and more generally in the Arab world. He was Professor of International Public Law at the University of Alexandria. He was awarded the UNESCO Prize for Human Rights Education in 1981.

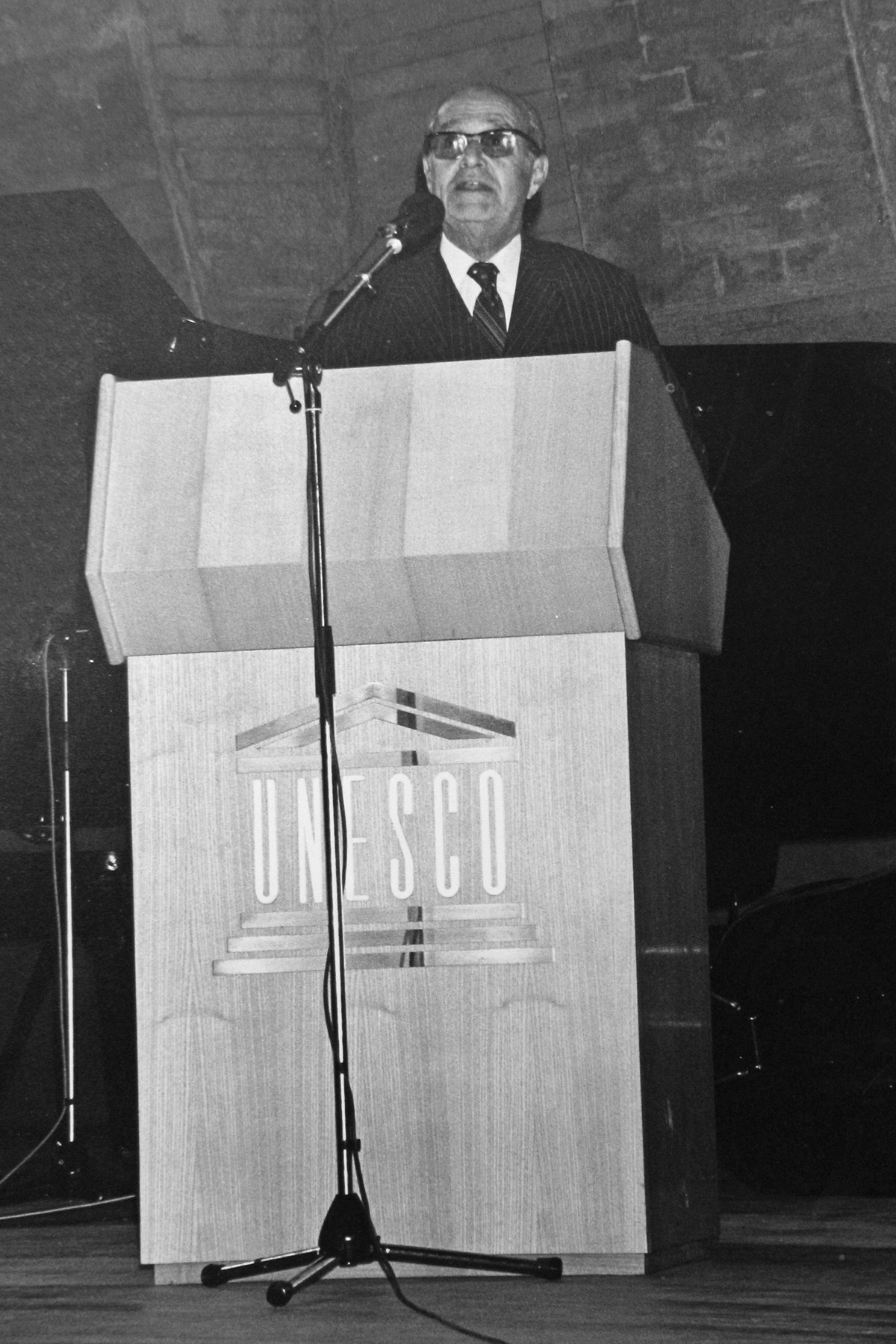
Dr. Aly Sadek Abou-Heif Giving a speech on the occasion of the ceremony for the award of the 1981 Unesco Prize for the Teaching of Human Rights

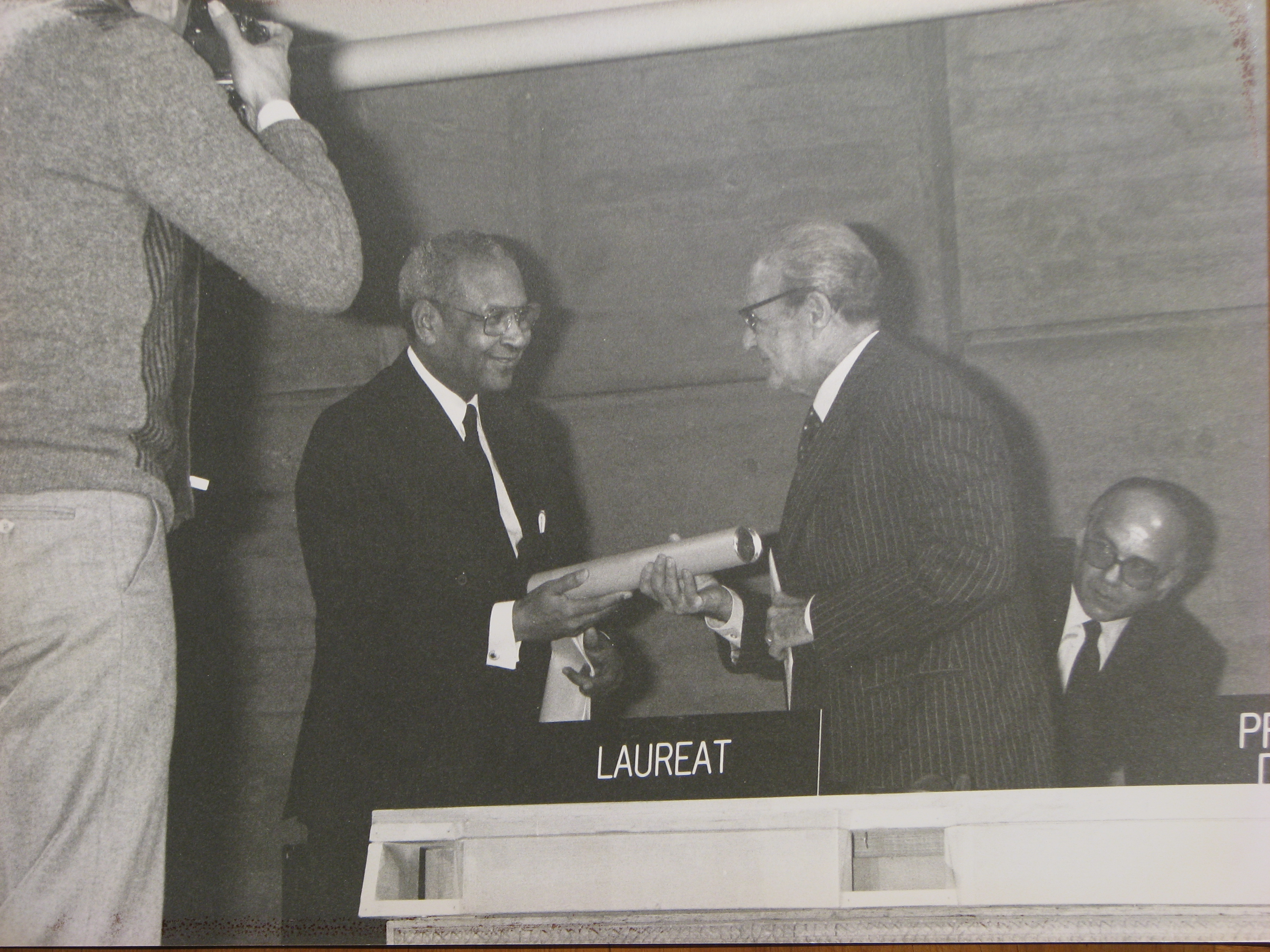
Dr. Abou-Heif receiving the 1981 Unesco Prize for the Teaching of Human Rights

Awards and achievements
Preceded by Paul Morren	UNESCO Prize for Human Rights Education; 1981	Succeeded by Felix Ermacora
