= Martin Schlichenmaier =

German mathematician

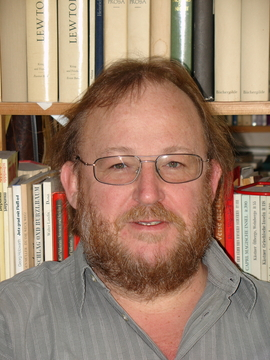
- Born: October 9, 1952; Backnang Germany
- Education: University of Karlsruhe, Germany
- Occupation: mathematician
- Website: math.uni.lu/schlichenmaier/

Martin Schlichenmaier is a German-Luxembourgish mathematician whose research deals with algebraic, geometric and analytic mathematical methods which partly have relations to theoretical and mathematical physics.

== Life and work ==
In 1990 Schlichenmaier earned a doctoral degree in mathematics at the University of Mannheim with Rainer Weissauer with the thesis Verallgemeinerte Krichever – Novikov Algebren und deren Darstellungen. His research topics are, beside other fields, the geometric foundations of quantisation, e.g. Berezin-Toeplitz-Quantisierung and infinite dimensional Lie algebras of geometric origin, like the algebras of Krichever- Novikov type.

From 1986 until 2003 he worked at the University of Mannheim. In the year 1996 he habilitated with the thesis Zwei Anwendungen algebraisch-geometrischer Methoden in der theoretischen Physik: Berezin-Toeplitz-Quantisierung und globale Algebren der zweidimensionalen konformen Feldtheorie

Since 2003 he has been professor at the University of Luxemburg, recently as Emeritus . From 2005 until 2017 he was director of the Mathematical Research Unit, Department of Mathematics at the University of Luxemburg. He is a member of the editorial boards of the mathematical journals Journal of Lie Theory, and Analysis and Mathematical Physics

From 2010 until 2022 he was president of the Luxembourgish Mathematical Society, SML. He received the Grand Prix 2016 en sciences mathematiques de L'Institut Grand-Ducal -prix de la Bourse de Luxembourg. 2019 he was appointed as full member of the Institut Grand-Ducal, Section des Sciences

== Selected publications ==
Books:

- Schlichenmaier, Martin (2014), Krichever-Novikov Type Algebras. Theory and Applications, Studies in Mathematics, vol. 53, Berlin/Boston: de Gruyter, doi:10.1515/9783110279641, ISBN 978-3-11-026517-0.
- Schlichenmaier, Martin (2007), An Introduction to Riemann Surfaces, Algebraic Curves and Moduli Spaces, 2nd enlarged edition, Theoretical and Mathematical Physics, Berlin/Heidelberg: Springer, doi:10.1007/978-3-540-71175-9, ISBN 978-3-540-71174-2.

Articles:

- Schlichenmaier, Martin (2003), "Local cocycles and central extensions for multi-point algebras of Krichever-Novikov type", J. reine angew. Math., 2003 (559): 53–94, arXiv:math/0112116, doi:10.1515/crll.2003.052, MR 1989644, S2CID 14518508.
- Karabegov, Alexander; Schlichenmaier, Martin (2001), "Identification of Berezin-Toeplitz deformation quantization" (PDF), J. reine angew. Math., 2001 (540): 49–76, doi:10.1515/crll.2001.086, MR 1868597, S2CID 9408910.
- Schlichenmaier, Martin; Sheinman, Oleg K. (2004), "Knizhnik-Zamolodchikov equations for positive genus and Krichever-Novikov algebras", Russ. Math. Surv., 59 (4): 737–770, Bibcode:2004RuMaS..59..737S, doi:10.1070/RM2004v059n04ABEH000760, MR 2106647, S2CID 250825111.
- Bordemann, Martin; Meinrenken, Eckhard; Schlichenmaier, Martin (1994), "Toeplitz quantization of Kähler manifolds and gl(N), N to infinity limits", Communications in Mathematical Physics, 165 (2): 281–296, arXiv:hep-th/9309134, doi:10.1007/BF02099772, MR 1301849, S2CID 117257261
