= Anja Mihr =

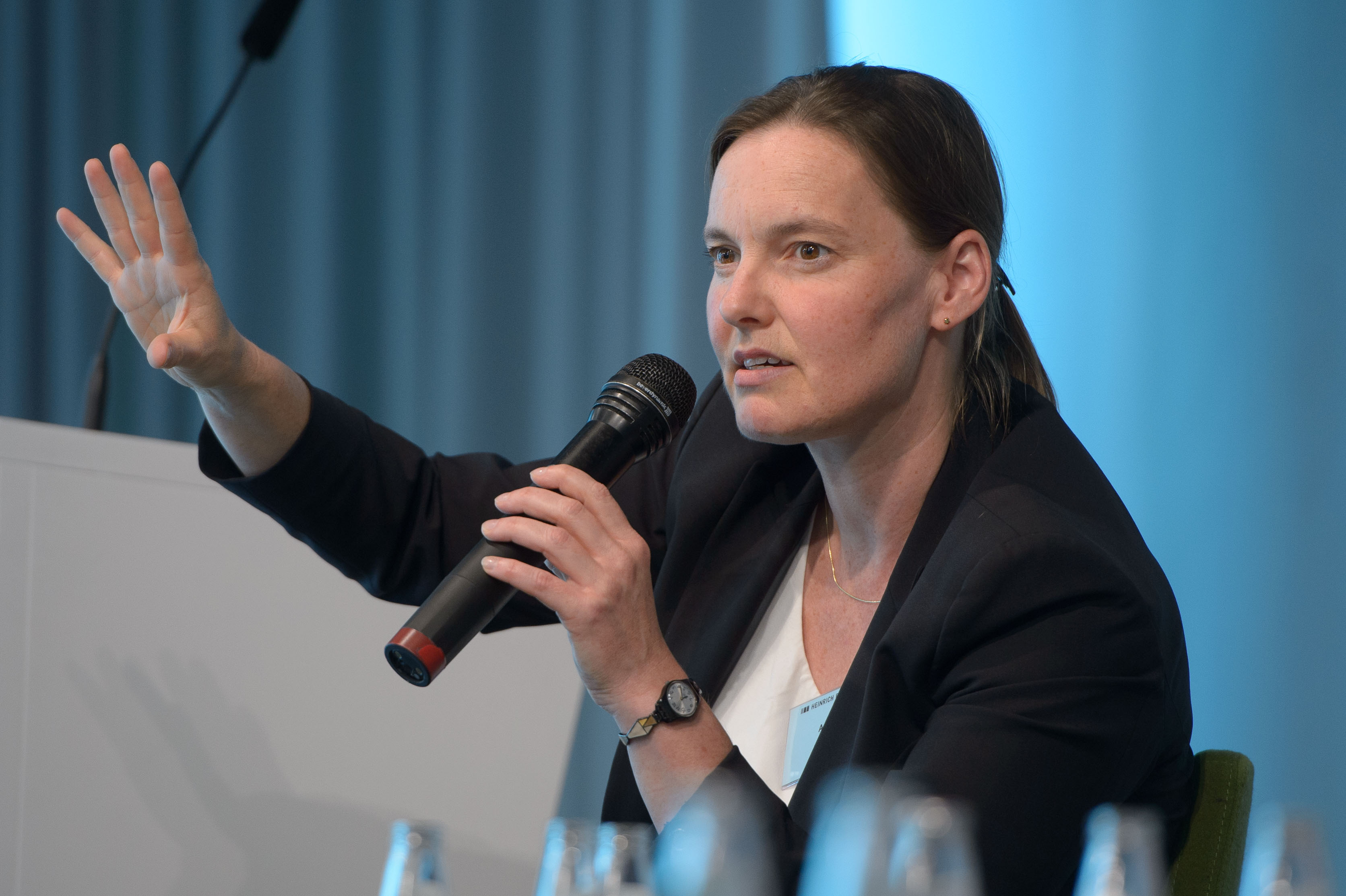
- Anja Mihr, 2015
- Citizenship: Germany
- Website: anjamihr.com

Anja Mihr (born 1969) is a German political scientist. She specialises in international human rights law, transitional justice, and governance. Mihr is the founder and director of the Center on Governance through Human Rights at the Berlin Governance Platform. Her research addresses democratic transitions, the implementation of international human rights norms at the local level, and the intersection of digitalisation with human rights frameworks. Throughout her career, she has held academic positions at universities in Germany, the Netherlands, the United States, Italy, China, and Kyrgyzstan, and most recently in Kyiv, Ukraine.

== Education ==
Mihr studied political science at the Free University of Berlin, where she completed her doctorate in 2001. Her doctoral dissertation analysed the impact of Amnesty International's human rights activities in the German Democratic Republic during the Cold War up to 1989. It was published under the title Amnesty International in der DDR – Menschenrechte im Visier der Stasi (Chr. Links Verlag, Berlin, 2002).

== Career ==
=== Professorships in Europe and Beyond ===
Following her doctoral studies, Mihr became a research associate at the German Institute for Human Rights and the UNESCO Chair for Human Rights at the University of Magdeburg, and served as Director of Research at Humboldt University of Berlin. Furthermore, she was associated with The Hague Institute for Global Justice, the OSCE in Albania, and the German development agency GIZ. It was during this period that she developed an interdisciplinary approach to her academic studies, combining international law with institutional politics.

Between 2006 and 2008, she served as European Programme Director for the European Master's Degree in Human Rights and Democratisation (E.MA) at the European Inter-University Centre for Human Rights and Democratisation (EIUC) in Venice, Italy. Mihr served as Associate Professor at the Netherlands Institute of Human Rights (SIM) at Utrecht University and subsequently held the Franz Haniel Chair in Public Policy at the Willy Brandt School of Public Policy at Erfurt University in Germany. In addition to these permanent positions, Mihr held visiting professorships at the Hebrew University of Jerusalem's Minerva Center for Human Rights, Peking University Law School, in collaboration with the Raoul Wallenberg Institute at Lund University, and at the School of International and Public Affairs (SIPA) at Columbia University in New York.

In 2015, Mihr founded the Center on Governance through Human Rights and the Berlin Governance Platform, a non-profit initiative based in Berlin that brings together researchers, policymakers, and civil society actors around questions of socio-ecological transformation and good governance. In 2018, Mihr took up a DAAD long-term lectureship as Professor for Human Rights, Democratisation, Transitology, International Relations, and Transitional Justice at the OSCE Academy in Bishkek, Kyrgyzstan. Her reasons for moving to Central Asia were based on her academic interests regarding autocracy: since she had already conducted research in the Middle East, China, Europe, Latin America, and Africa, she believed that moving to this region would allow her to witness the rise of autocratic governance firsthand.

During her tenure, Mihr co-developed a new Master's programme in Human Rights and Sustainability (MAHRS) together with the Global Campus of Human Rights, a network of eight regional master's programmes operating under the auspices of the European Inter-University Centre for Human Rights and Democratisation in Venice. The MAHRS programme launched on 1 September 2023, becoming the eighth programme in the Global Campus network. Supported by the European Union, the programme was designed to address the specific challenges of the Central Asian region, including questions of green supply-chain transformation and Kyrgyzstan's position as a transit country along China's Belt and Road Initiative. Since 2023, Mihr has served as Academic Director of the Global Campus of Human Rights in Central Asia at the OSCE Academy, continuing to supervise the MAHRS programme beyond the end of her DAAD lectureship.

In June 2023, German Federal President Frank-Walter Steinmeier, during a state visit to Kyrgyzstan, visited the OSCE Academy and met personally with Mihr to discuss current projects and institutional challenges. Students from Central Asian countries also discussed with him the effects of security and economic policy shifts in the context of the Russian invasion of Ukraine, focusing in particular on how increasing autocratisation was affecting social mobility and the career prospects of young graduates in the post-Soviet region. The same year, Mihr received the International Award in Human Rights in Higher Education from the University Consortium on Human Rights Education (UCCHR) in recognition of her contribution to human rights education.

Since 2025, Mihr holds the DAAD Visiting Professorship for European and German Studies (GES) at the National University of Kyiv-Mohyla Academy in Kyiv, Ukraine.

=== Advisory Roles ===
From 2018 to 2023, Mihr served as a member and chair of the Scientific Advisory Board of the European Union Agency for Fundamental Rights (FRA) in Vienna. From 2002 to 2006, she was a member of the executive board of Amnesty International Germany, serving as chairwoman for two of those years.

== Research ==
Mihr has published extensively on democratic transition in post-authoritarian and post-conflict states, with particular attention to the post-Soviet region. Her 2017 monograph Regime Consolidation and Transitional Justice: A Comparative Study of Germany, Spain and Turkey (Cambridge University Press) examines how states use transitional justice mechanisms to consolidate democratic governance following periods of authoritarian rule or violent conflict. Her research in this area analyses the conditions under which post-conflict political systems develop the institutional capacity and political will to implement measures that improve the quality of democratic governance.

Mihr has developed the concept of "glocal governance" as an analytical framework for examining how local actors and institutions implement international norms in contexts where state authority is limited or contested. Her 2022 open-access monograph Glocal Governance: How to Govern in the Anthropocene? presents this framework in relation to contemporary global challenges including climate change.

In her research on internet governance, Mihr has used human rights approaches to govern cyberspace, coming up with what she calls "cyber justice." Mihr’s contribution to internet governance includes analyzing the applicability of international human rights law and rule of law principles to internet governance. Mihr's work on human rights education examines the role of training and capacity-building in enabling the adoption and implementation of human rights standards at the local level. This includes her work directing regional master's programmes and producing comparative research on human rights education in Central Asia.

== Selected Publications ==
=== Monographs ===
- Mihr, Anja. Amnesty International in der DDR: Menschenrechte im Visier der Stasi. Chr. Links Verlag, Berlin, 2002.
- Mihr, Anja. Regime Consolidation and Transitional Justice: A Comparative Study of Germany, Spain and Turkey. Cambridge University Press, 2017 (paperback, 2019). ISBN 978-1-108-42306-9
- Mihr, Anja. Cyber Justice: Human Rights and Good Governance for the Internet. SpringerBriefs in Political Science, Springer, 2017.
- Mihr, Anja. Glocal Governance: How to Govern in the Anthropocene? Springer, 2022 (Open Access). doi:10.1007/978-3-031-02108-4

=== Edited Volumes ===
- Mihr, Anja; Mahler, Claudia; Toivanen, Reetta (eds.). The UN-Decade for Human Rights Education and the Inclusion of National Minorities. Peter Lang Verlag, Frankfurt/Berlin, 2009.
- Mihr, Anja; Goodhart, Michael (eds.). Human Rights in the 21st Century: Continuity and Change since 9/11. Palgrave Macmillan, 2011.
- Mihr, Anja; Gibney, Mark (eds.). The SAGE Handbook of Human Rights (2 vols.). SAGE Publications, London, 2014.
- Manou, Dimitra; Baldwin, Andrew; Cubie, Dug; Mihr, Anja; Thorp, Teresa (eds.). Climate Change, Migration and Human Rights: Law and Policy Perspectives. Routledge Studies in Environmental Migration, Displacement and Resettlement. Routledge, 2017.
- Mihr, Anja (Chief Editor). Transformation and Developments in the OSCE Region. Springer/Palgrave Macmillan, 2020.
- Mihr, Anja (Chief Editor). Between Peace and Conflict in the East and West: Studies on Transformation and Development in the OSCE Region. Springer/Palgrave Macmillan, 2021.
- Hasan Khan; Mihr, Anja (eds.). Europe–Central Asia Relations: New Connectivity Frameworks. Europe–Asia Connectivity Series, Palgrave, 2023.
- Mihr, Anja; Wittke, Cindy (eds.). Human Rights Dissemination in Central Asia: Human Rights Education and Capacity Building in the Post-Soviet Space. Springer, 2023 (Open Access). doi:10.1007/978-3-031-27972-0
- Mihr, Anja; Sorbello, Paolo; Weiffen, Brigitte (eds.). Securitization and Democracy in Eurasia: Transformation and Development in the OSCE Region. Springer, 2023 (Open Access). doi:10.1007/978-3-031-16659-4
- Mihr, Anja; Pierobon, Chiara (eds.). Polarization, Shifting Borders and Liquid Governance: Studies on Transformation and Development in the OSCE Region. Springer, 2024 (Open Access). doi:10.1007/978-3-031-44584-2

=== Selected Journal Articles and Book Chapters ===
- Mihr, Anja. "Human Rights Awareness, Education and Democratization: The Challenge for the 21st Century." Journal of Human Rights, vol. 8, no. 2, April 2009, pp. 177–189. Routledge.
- Mihr, Anja. "The Impact of Amnesty International's Policies and Campaigns During the Cold War – the Case Study of East Germany." In de Jonge, Wilco; McGonigle-Leyh, Brianne; Mihr, Anja; van Troost, Lars (eds.), 50 Years of Amnesty International: Reflections and Perspectives, SIM Special 36, University of Utrecht, 2011, pp. 21–50.
- Mihr, Anja. "'Glocal' Governance in the OSCE Region: A Research Proposal." In Between Peace and Conflict in the East and the West. Springer, 2021, pp. 287–297. doi:10.1007/978-3-030-77489-9_16

== See also ==
- Transitional justice
- International human rights law
- Human rights education
- OSCE Academy in Bishkek
- European Union Agency for Fundamental Rights
- Amnesty International in Germany
