= Felix Ermacora =

Austrian professor and politician (1923–1995)

Felix Ermacora (13 October 1923 – 24 February 1995) was a leading human rights expert of Austria and a member of the Austrian People's Party.

== Biography ==
In his youth, Ermacora served in the army of Nazi Germany at the rank of private.

He was a professor of international law at the University of Innsbruck from 1956, at the University of Vienna from 1964, member of Parliament for the Austrian People's Party from 1971 to 1990, member of the European Commission of Human Rights and the United Nations Human Rights Committee 1959-1980 and 1984–1987. In 1974 he was President of the United Nations Commission on Human Rights, and from 1984 he was UN Special Rapporteur for Afghanistan. In 1992, he cofounded the Ludwig Boltzmann Institut für Menschenrechte, with his students and close collaborators Manfred Nowak and Hannes Tretter, and served as its first director.

He was part of UN delegations investigating human rights abuses in Chile, South Africa, occupied Palestine, Iran and Afghanistan. On behalf of the Council of Europe, he investigated human rights abuses in Algeria, Greece, Ireland, Turkey and Cyprus. As an academic, a legislator and a UN official, he fought unconditionally against injustice and human rights abuses. In an expert opinion commissioned by the Bavarian government in 1991, Ermacora concluded that the Expulsion of Germans after World War II constituted a genocide and crime against humanity. As the UN Special Rapporteur for Afghanistan, he uncovered "gross violations of human rights" by Soviet forces in Afghanistan, made public in a 1985 report.

He received the German Great Cross of Merit, Commander of the Ordre national du Mérite of France, Commander 1st Class of the Order of the Polar Star of Sweden, the European Charlemagne Award of the Sudetendeutsche Landsmannschaft, the UNESCO Prize for Human Rights Education in 1983 and the European Human Rights Prize of the Council of Europe in 1992 (jointly with Médecins Sans Frontières) for "an exceptional contribution to the cause of human rights". He received honorary doctorates at the universities of Cologne and Strasbourg, and was a corresponding member of the Austrian Academy of Sciences from 1971. He was also a board member of the International Society for Human Rights.

In 1999, the Felix Ermacora Institut was founded, and in 2005, the Felix Ermacora Human Rights Award was established by the Faction of the Conservative Party in the Austrian Parliament. The first prize winners of Felix Ermacora Human Rights Award were the Jesuit priest Georg Sporschill and ORF journalist Friedrich Orter. The Felix Ermacora Society was founded in 2005, and is headed by Wolfgang Schüssel, the former Austrian Chancellor.

His students include Andreas Khol, a former President of the Austrian parliament and, mosts prominently, Manfred Nowak.

He died in 1995, of a disease he caught on a UN mission in Afghanistan and Pakistan in December 1994.

== Selected works ==
- Handbuch der Grundfreiheiten und der Menschenrechte, 1963
- Allgemeine Staatslehre, 2 vol., 1970
- Österreichische Verfassungslehre, 2 vol., 1970/80
- Grundriß der Menschenrechte in Österreich, 1988
- Die Entstehung der Bundesverfassung, 5 vol., 1986–93
- Menschenrechte in der sich wandelnden Welt, 3 vol., 1974–94
- Menschenrechte ohne Wenn und Aber. Erlebnisse und Begegnungen, 1993

== Literature ==
- Manfred Nowak, Dorothea Steurer and Hannes Tretter (eds.), Festschrift für Felix Ermacora - Fortschritt im Bewußtsein der Grund- und Menschenrechte, Kehl am Rhein, Engel, 1988

Academic offices
Preceded by	Professor of International Law at the University of Innsbruck; 1957-1964	Succeeded by
Preceded by	Professor of International Law at the University of Vienna; 1964-1992	Succeeded by
Preceded by	Director of the Ludwig Boltzmann Institut für Menschenrechte; 1992-1995	Succeeded by
Political offices
Preceded by	Member of the National Council of Austria; 1971-1990	Succeeded by
Diplomatic posts
Preceded by	President of the United Nations Commission on Human Rights; 1974	Succeeded by
Preceded by	UN Special Rapporteur for Afghanistan; 1984-	Succeeded by
Awards and achievements
Preceded by Ali Sadek Abou-Heif	UNESCO Prize for Human Rights Education; 1983	Succeeded by Héctor Fix Zamudio
Preceded by Lech Wałęsa; International Helsinki Federation for Human Rights	European Human Rights Prize (jointly with Médecins Sans Frontières); 1992	Succeeded by Sergei Kovalyov; Raoul Wallenberg
