= Fabrizio Marrella =

Italian academic

Fabrizio Marrella, born in Venice, Italy, is Professor of International Law and of International Business Law at the University of Venice. In 2008, he was appointed as the E.MA Programme Director at the European Inter-University Centre for Human Rights and Democratisation (EIUC) where he was a member of the Board of Directors.

== Education ==
Marrella holds doctorates in Law from Pantheon-Sorbonne University and University of Bologna Law School. He also holds the Certificate as well as the Diploma of The Hague Academy of International Law (1998). He was awarded, on the base of merit, two scholarships: one from the University of Bologna and another one from the National Research Council (C.N.R.) of Italy.

== Career ==
Marrella has an extensive background in international law. He was invited to deliver a course at the Hague Academy of International Law in 2013. He specializes in International Economic Law and focuses primarily on international commercial contracts and investment arbitration also in connection with new human rights issues.

Marrella is fluent in English, French, Spanish and Italian.

== Past academic positions ==
In 2006, Marrella was appointed professeur invité at the University of Strasbourg (France). In 2007 and 2008, Prof. Marrella has served as vice-Director of the Harvard University-Venice program where he taught International Business Law. He was formerly Adjunct Professor of International Business Law at the IHEAL (Institute for Advanced Studies on Latin America) of the University of Paris III: Sorbonne Nouvelle and lecturer at the Paris Institute of Comparative Law (Panthéon-Assas University). Marrella also served as co-director for the Wake Forest University School of Law Comparative Law Program in Venice.

Marrella taught "The international Arbitral Process", Vanderbilt University Law School; International Business Transactions (Widener International Law Summer Institute); Derecho del comercio internacional (taught in Spanish) in the Universidad Interamericana de Puerto Rico.

== Fellowship ==
Marrella is a member or a fellow of:

- International Law Association (sezione italiana).
- European Society of International Law (ESIL)
- European Private International Law Research Network.
- Italian Society for International Law/Società Italiana per il Diritto internazionale (SIDI/ISIL).
- Italian Arbitration Association/ Associazione italiana per l'arbitrato (AIA).
- CIDOIE (centro interuniversitario sul diritto delle organizzazioni internazionali economiche delle Università "Bocconi" di Milano, Genova, Torino, delPiemonte orientale e della Val d'Aosta)
- Societé Française de Droit International (SFDI).
- Societé Française de Legislation Comparée.
- Association of Attenders and Alumni of the Hague Academy of International Law.
- Association des Anciens de la Cité Internationale Universitaire de Paris.
- Association "Henry Capitant" des amis de la culture juridique française.

He sits on the editorial boards of:

- Series Editor (with Profs. H. Fischer; F. Benoît-Rohmer and M. O'Flaherty) of EIUC Studies on Human Rights and Democratisation, Cambridge University Press.
- Associate Editor of Transnational Dispute Management (US-UK)
- Journal of International Trade Law and Policy (UK)
- European Yearbook on Human Rights, Dir. by M. Nowak and W. Benedek, Neuer Wissenschaft Verlag, Vienna, Austria.
- Contratto e Impresa, Cedam, Padova, dir. by Prof. Francesco Galgano.
- Contratto e Impresa/Europa, Cedam, Padova, dir. by F. Galgano and M. Bin.
- Diritti umani e diritto internazionale, Franco Angeli, Milan.
- Member of the Scientific Advisory Board of International Constitutional Law(dir. C. Fuchs e K. Lachmayer, University of Vienna).

== Research interests ==
Marrella's research interests cover International Law with particular emphasis on International Business and Investment Law; International Arbitration and Dispute Resolution Methods as well as International Human Rights and areas of cross reference with Economic Law.

== Publications ==
He has written extensively in the field of International Law. Among his writings there are:

- Droit International by Prof. Fabrizio Marrella and Prof. Dominique Carreau, Pedone - Paris, 2012
- Diritto e prassi del commercio internazionale, di Fabrizio Marrella e Francesco Galgano, in Trattato di diritto commerciale e di diritto pubblico dell'economia dir. by F. Galgano, Padova, Cedam, 2010, pp. XXIV-937.
- Economic Globalisation and Human Rights, (W. Benedek, K. De Feyter and F. Marrella eds.), EIUC series n.1, Cambridge, Cambridge University Press, 2007.
- Diritto del commercio internazionale, by Fabrizio Marrella & Francesco Galgano, 2 ed., Padova, Cedam, 2007, pp. XXIV-772.
- Le opere d'arte tra cooperazione internazionale e conflitti armati, by F. Marrella (ed.), Collana del Dipartimento di Scienze Giuridiche dell'Università "Cà Foscari" di Venezia, Padova, Cedam, 2006.
- La nuova lex mercatoria. Principi Unidroit ed usi dei contratti del commercio internazionale, (The new Lex Mercatoria. Unidroit Principles and usages of International Contracts) in Trattato di diritto commerciale e di diritto pubblico dell'economia dir. by F. Galgano, pref. by H. Grigera Naòn, Padova, Cedam, 2003, pp. LXII-1001
- Alle origini dell'arbitrato commerciale internazionale. L'arbitrato a Venezia tra Medioevo ed Età moderna, by F. Marrella and A. Mozzato), in Collana della Rivista di diritto internazionale privato e processuale, Pref. by Andrea Giardina, Cedam, Padova, 2001.

He is also the author of more than 35 articles published in national and international peer-reviewed Law Journals.
