= Florence Benoît-Rohmer =

French jurist

Florence Benoît-Rohmer (born 20 September 1952) is a French jurist, specializing in European Law and Human Rights, and currently a professor of Public Law at the University of Strasbourg.

== Biography ==
Benoît-Rohmer was born in Strasbourg and was educated at the Lycée Internationale des Pontonniers before attending the Robert Schuman University, where she obtained a master's degree in Public Law, as well as DEA (diplôme d'études approfondies) post-graduate diplomas in Public Law and Community Law, and a Doctorate.

She began her academic career as lecturer in 1984. She was the Dean of the Faculty of Law at the Robert Schuman University from 2000 to 2003, and President of the Robert Schuman University (Strasbourg III) from July 2003 to December 2008, until the merger of the three major universities of Strasbourg, a process where she played a key role. Between 2009 and 2015, she was the Secretary General of the European Inter-University Centre for Human Rights and Democratisation, and was responsible for the Master in Human Rights at the University of Strasbourg.

In 2010 Benoît-Rohmer created two interdisciplinary summer programmes: the Venice Academy of Human Rights opened to academics, PhD students and practitioners, and the Venice School of Human Rights for postgraduate students from all academic backgrounds.

In May 2017, she signed a petition to block the Front national by voting for Emmanuel Macron at the 2nd round of the 2017 French presidential election.

== Other roles ==
- Member of the Scientific Committee of the European Union Agency for Fundamental Rights
- President of the French NGO Plaider les droits de l'homme (PLDH)
- Regular columnist on human rights in the Journal of European Law

== Publications ==
Her work focused on human rights both within the European Union and the Council of Europe, especially the European Convention on Human Rights and the European Social Charter. She underlined the need to promote regional mechanisms of Human Rights protection stressing, at the same time, the necessity to foster cooperation among them in order to guaranty the principle of universality of Human Rights.

- The minority question in Europe : towards a coherent system of protection for national minorities. Strasbourg: Editions du Conseil de l'Europe. 1996. ISBN 978-92-871-2932-1.
- The Rebirth of Democracy, twelve Constitutions of Central and Eastern Europe. Strasbourg: Editions du Conseil de l'Europe. 1996.
- Les Minorités quels droits? : étude de la convention-cadre pour la protection des minorités nationales [What Rights for Minorities? : A study of the Framework Convention for the Protection of National Minorities]. Strasbourg: Editions du Conseil de l'Europe. 1999. ISBN 978-92-871-4029-6.
- Council of Europe Law – Towards a pan-European legal area. Strasbourg: Editions du Conseil de l'Europe. 2005. ISBN 978-92-871-5594-8. (with Heinrich Klebes)
- The European Parliament as a champion of European values. Luxembourg: Office for Official Publications of the European Communities. 2008. ISBN 978-92-823-2484-4.

== Awards ==
- Laurea Honoris Causa from the University of St. Clement of Ohrid, Bulgaria
- Dimitrie Cantemir Christian University, Romania.
- Officier of the Ordre des Palmes Académiques
- Officier of the National Order of Merit
- Chevalier of the Legion of Honour
