= Plaider les droits de l'homme =

French human rights organization

Plaider les droits de l'homme (PLDH) is a Strasbourg-based NGO active in the field of human rights. In collaboration with the University of Strasbourg (France) and University of Freiburg it organises an annual Moot Court on the European Court of Human Rights. The German Judge of the Federal Constitutional Court of Germany Johannes Masing, the German Professor Matthias Jestaedt and the French Professor Florence Benoît-Rohmer are in charge of this unique French-German collaboration. The honorary President of the association is Hans-Christian Krüger, former Deputy Secretary-General of the Council of Europe. Secretary general of the association is the French lawyer Dr Manuela de Ravel d'Esclapon.
