= Jean-François Rischard =

Jean-François Rischard (born 2 October 1948) is a Luxembourgish economist, and was the first European Vice President of the World Bank from 1998 to 2005. He lives in Paris, France.

== Early years ==
Rischard was born in Luxembourg to Charles-Edouard Rischard and Huguette Navereau. He attended the University of Aix-Marseille where he received both a graduate and doctoral degree in Economics. Rischard also has a doctorate in law from the University of Luxembourg, and a Master's in Business Administration from Harvard Business School.

== Career ==
Rischard joined the World Bank Group in 1975. In 1976 he became a project officer in the Industrial Projects Department and in 1982 he joined the Financial Policy and Analysis Department as a Senior Financial Analyst. In 1986 to join the Wall Street firm of Drexel Burnham Lambert as a Senior Vice-president for International Fixed Income markets.

== Publications ==
- High Noon 20 Global Problems, 20 Years to Solve Them (2003). ISBN 0-465-07010-8.
