= Emma Schymanski =

Chemist

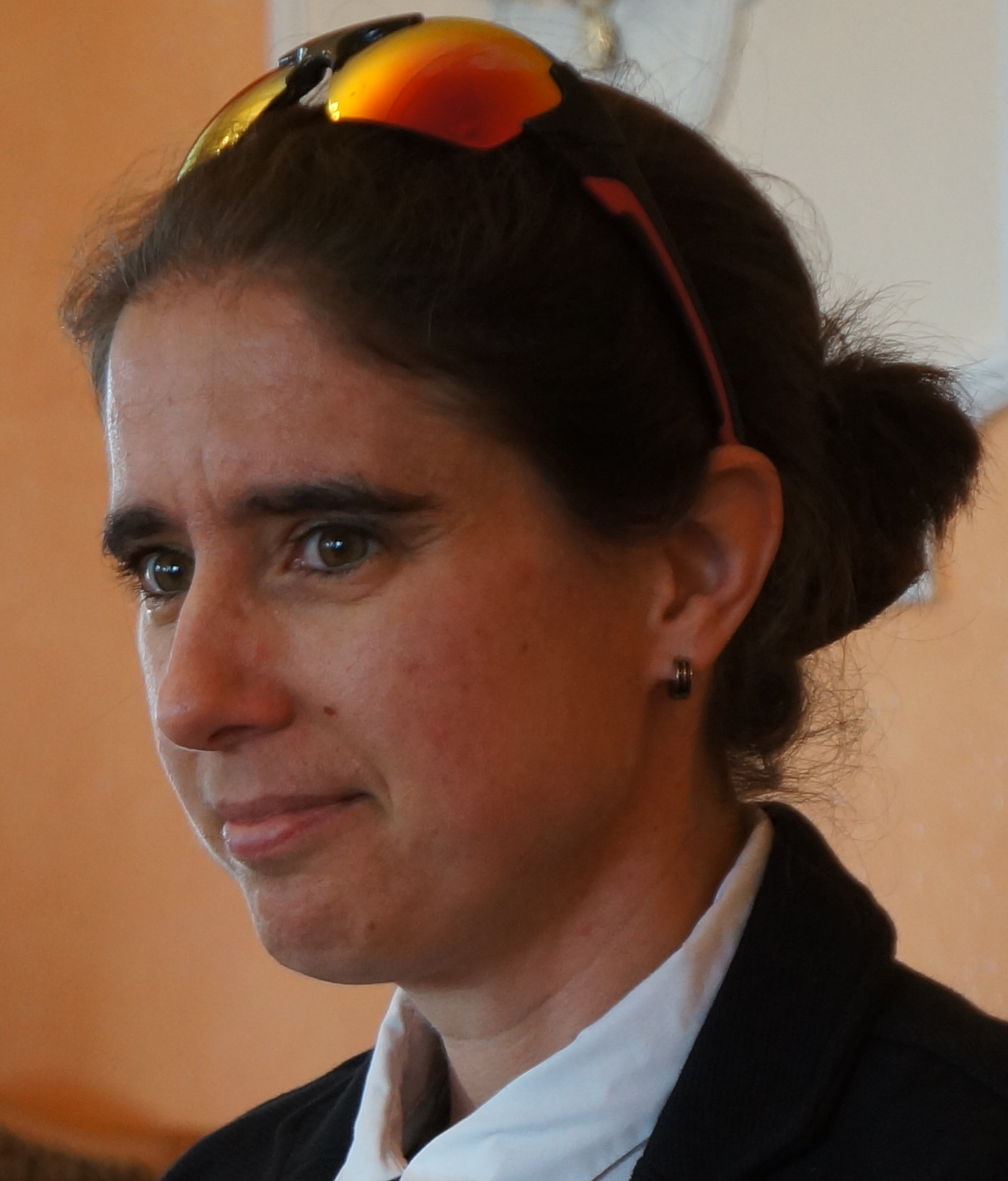
- Born: Emma Craven

Emma Schymanski (née Craven) is an Australian chemist known for her work identifying unknown organic compounds, particularly pollutants, and is an advocate for open science. She is currently a Professor of Cheminformatics at the University of Luxembourg.

== Education and career ==
Schymanski graduated with a Bachelor of Science in Chemistry and a Bachelor of Engineering in Environmental Engineering from the University of Western Australia in 2003. While at the University of Western Australia, Schymanski combined chemistry and environmental engineering to study contaminated sites that required assessment and remediation. As an undergraduate, she participated in the 2002 Nobel Laureate conference which brings Nobel laureates and young scientists together; Schymanski and Pia Sappl were the first students from the University of Western Australia to receive this invitation and possibly the first Australians.

After college, Schymanski spent three years at Golder Associates in Perth as an environmental engineer and then joined the Helmholtz Centre for Environmental Research in Leipzig Germany where she finished her Ph.D. in 2011. Schymanski's subsequent postdoctoral position was at the Swiss Federal Institute of Aquatic Science and Technology (Eawag) including a Marie Curie Intra-European Postdoctoral Fellowship. Schymanski is currently a Full Professor at the University of Luxembourg where she is the head of the Environmental Cheminformatics Group.

In 2021, Schymanski was interviewed by the Metabolomics Society article in MetaboNews and during the interview she describes her introduction to the field of metabolomics, the current strengths of the field, and potential future applications of metabolomics research.

== Research ==
Schymanski's first research publications were from her undergraduate work when she worked on developing new metal-containing polymers which resulted in three lead author publications.

As a graduate student, Schymanski started using information on the fragmentation pattern of organic compounds as a means to expand the identification of unknown compounds. Schymanski applied these novel methods to the identification of unknown organic compounds found in wastewater, and used data collectively gathered by the NORMAN Association to define barriers to the identification of unknown organic compounds in water. Identifying and tracking unknown organic compounds continues to be an avenue of research pursued by Schymanski and she is a co-author on a 2014 textbook describing these methods.

In 2012, Schymanski and Steffen Neumann started the Critical Assessment of Small Molecule Identification (CASMI) contest that provided researchers with information about unknown organic compounds and challenged them to use automated computational tools identify the unknown compounds. The Metabolomics Society highlighted the 2012 contest in their newsletter. There have been multiple iterations of the contest, and Schymanski examined the results of the 2016 contest.

Schymanski's research focuses on characterizing organic compounds found in wastewater and exposomics, or the science of compounds that people are exposed to over their lifetimes. Schymanski has developed a subset of PubChem for exposomics, PubChemLite, which can be annotated to increase ability of researchers to identify unknown environmental compounds. Within this field, Schymanski is working to automate the identification of a group of fluorinated compounds called ‘per- and poly-fluoroalkyl substances’ (PFASs) in order to increase the ability of researchers to find unknown PFAS in the environment.

Schymanski is an advocate for open science and data sharing. Within the NORMAN network, a collaborative activity across Europe, North America, and Asia, Schymanski worked in 2011 with the team that established NORMAN MassBank, which was a community-driven project to gather information about small molecules. In 2015, Schymanski expanded this type of data with the NORMAN Suspect List Exchange. Schymanski has also worked to develop computational tools that allow the processing of complex high resolution mass spectrometry data and sought to establish standards to consider the quality of the mass spectrometry data. Schymanski's 2014 publication in Environmental Science & Technology establishes a means to estimate confidence in the quality of unknown organic compound identifications (now known as "Schymanski Confidence") and, as of 2021, has over 1000 citations. In 2018, Schymanski considered this paper her greatest achievement because it established the standard for compound identification in metabolomics and encouraged community conversation about future of these tools.

== Notable publications ==
- Schymanski, Emma L.; Jeon, Junho; Gulde, Rebekka; Fenner, Kathrin; Ruff, Matthias; Singer, Heinz P.; Hollender, Juliane (18 February 2014). "Identifying Small Molecules via High Resolution Mass Spectrometry: Communicating Confidence". Environmental Science & Technology. 48 (4): 2097–2098. Bibcode:2014EnST...48.2097S. doi:10.1021/es5002105. ISSN 0013-936X. PMID 24476540.
- Schymanski, Emma L.; Singer, Heinz P.; Slobodnik, Jaroslav; Ipolyi, Ildiko M.; Oswald, Peter; Krauss, Martin; Schulze, Tobias; Haglund, Peter; Letzel, Thomas; Grosse, Sylvia; Thomaidis, Nikolaos S. (1 August 2015). "Non-target screening with high-resolution mass spectrometry: critical review using a collaborative trial on water analysis". Analytical and Bioanalytical Chemistry. 407 (21): 6237–6255. doi:10.1007/s00216-015-8681-7. hdl:10234/147867. ISSN 1618-2650. PMID 25976391. S2CID 29696368.

== Awards ==
- Royal Society of Western Australia, University Medal for outstanding student in natural and earth sciences (2003)
- Society of Environmental Toxicology and Chemistry, Best Platform Presentation by a student (2008)
- FNR ATTRACT Fellowship for the development of new methods to identify unknown chemicals (2018)
- The Analytical Scientist, Top 40 under 40 Power List (2018)
- The Analytical Scientist Power List, "Planet Protectors" field (2024)

== Personal life ==
Schymanski is married to Stan Schymanski, an ecohydrologist. and he has shared insight about dual career couples and their path to positions in Luxembourg. They are the first dual career couple to both receive the FNR ATTRACT award.
