= University of Luxembourg =

Public university in Luxembourg

- Université du Luxembourg (French); Universität Luxemburg (German); Universitéit Lëtzebuerg (Luxembourgish)
- Type: Public university
- Established: 2003; 23 years ago
- Affiliations: Guild of European Research-Intensive Universities; UniGR; Europaeum
- Rector: Jens Kreisel
- Faculty: 1,600 (May 2025)
- Total staff: 2,500+ (May 2025)
- Students: 6,700+ (May 2025)
- Doctoral students: 1,000+ (May 2025)
- Location: Esch-sur-Alzette and Luxembourg City, Luxembourg; 49°30′13″N 5°56′55″E
- Campus: Urban
- Website: uni.lu

The University of Luxembourg (French: Université du Luxembourg; German: Universität Luxemburg; Luxembourgish: Universitéit Lëtzebuerg) is a public research university in Esch-sur-Alzette and Luxembourg City, Luxembourg. It was founded in 2003 and is the only public university in Luxembourg.

== History ==
The University of Luxembourg was formed in 2003 by combining four existing education and research institutes: the Centre universitaire, Institut supérieur d'études et de recherches pédagogiques, Institut supérieur de technologie, and Institut d'études éducatives et sociales. During the COVID-19 pandemic in Luxembourg as part of the worldwide COVID-19 pandemic, the university switched to remote learning and later hybrid learning.

The creation of the campus at Esch-sur-Alzette was part of an initiative to repurpose former steel industry land. This industry closed in 1997. The campus opened in 2015, incorporating former blast furnaces and warehouses.

== Academics ==
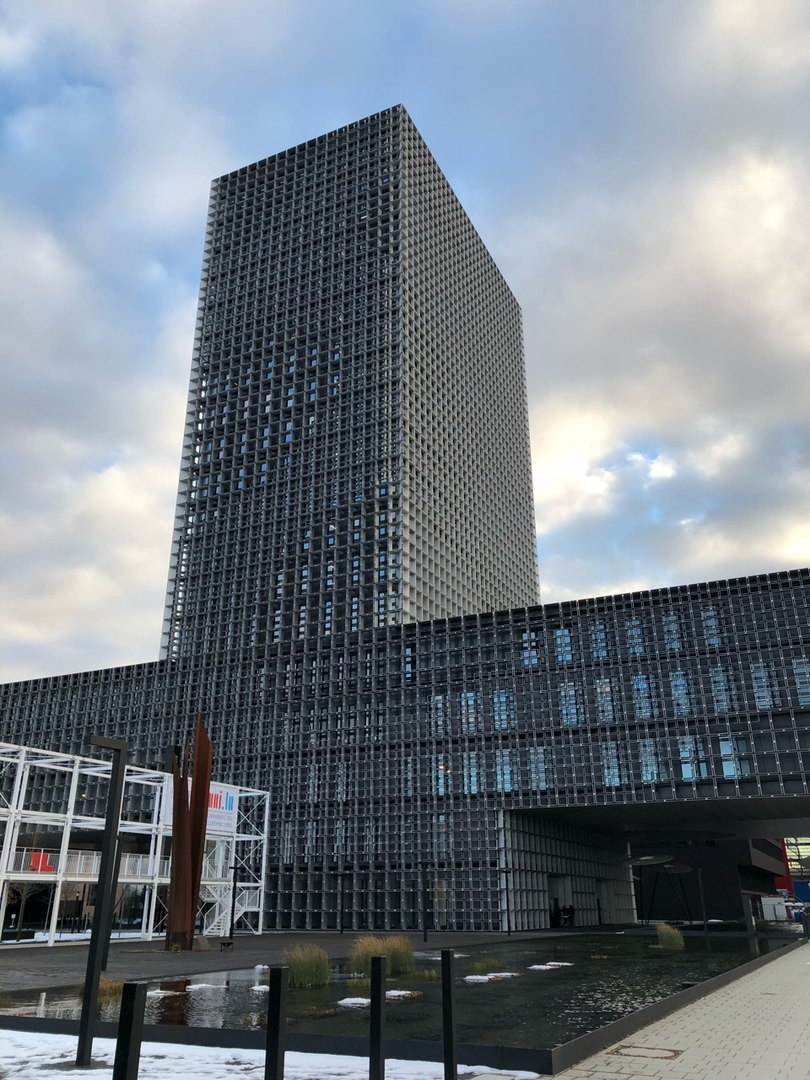
Maison du Savoir, headquarters of the University of Luxembourg

The university has three campuses: the Belval campus in Esch-sur-Alzette, and the Kirchberg and Limpertsberg campuses in Luxembourg City. The university is multilingual and courses are generally taught in two languages, being French and English or French and German. Some courses are taught in three, and some courses are taught entirely in English. Some courses are quadrilingual, being taught in English, French, German and Luxembourgish.

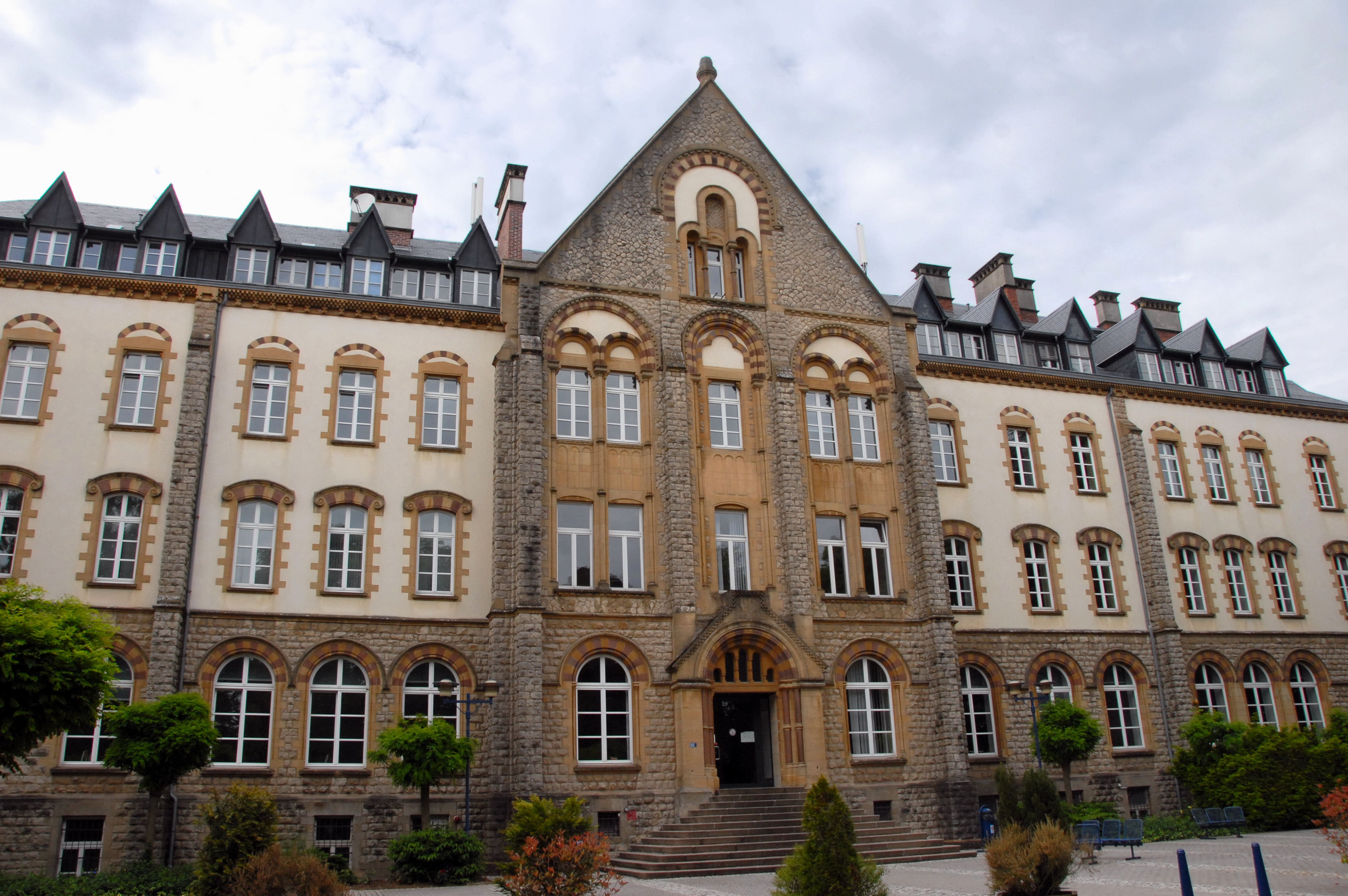
Limpertsberg campus

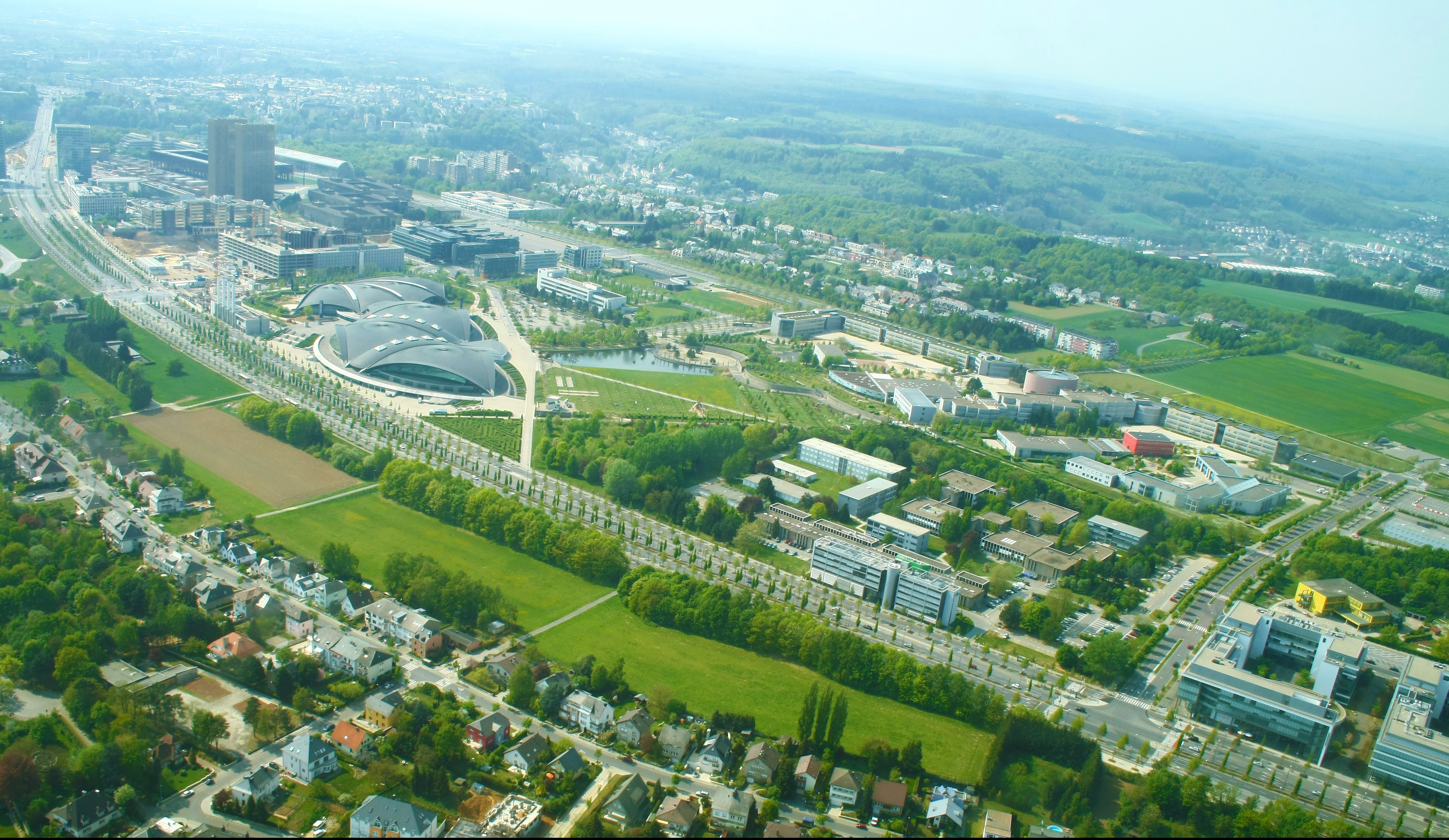
Kirchberg campus

The university offers 24 bachelor's degrees, 51 master's degrees, and doctorates. Bachelor's degrees require a semester of study abroad. The university also offers vocational training and lifelong learning courses. The University has three faculties: the Faculty of Science, Technology, and Medicine; the Faculty of Law, Economics, and Finance; and the Faculty of Humanities, Education, and Social Sciences. There are five interdisciplinary centres: the Interdisciplinary Centre for Security, Reliability and Trust; the Luxembourg Centre for Systems Biomedicine; the Luxembourg Centre for Contemporary and Digital History; the Luxembourg Centre for European Law; and the Luxembourg Centre for Socio-Environmental Systems.

The university is governed by a board of governors, a rector, and a university council. The current rector of the University of Luxembourg is Jens Kreisel.

=== Rankings ===
University rankings

Global – Overall
- ARWU World: 601-700 (2025)
- QS World: 381 (2026)
- THE Young Universities: 20 (2024)
- USNWR Global: 473 (2025-2026)

In 2025, U.S. News & World Report ranked the University of Luxembourg number 473 in Best Global Universities and number 179 in Best Global Universities in Europe.

The Times Higher Education World University Rankings ranked the University of Luxembourg 251–300 in their 2026 World University Ranking and 20th worldwide in their 2024 Young University Rankings. The university's scores in international outlook (93.2), included a high percentage of international students (52%), and research quality (75.1). Lower ratings included research environment (39.3) and teaching (39.9).

The Academic Ranking of World Universities, also known as the Shanghai Ranking, ranked the University of Luxembourg 601-700 in their 2025 rankings.

== Research ==
Research at the university focuses on the areas of digital transformation, medicine and health, as well as sustainable and societal development. A special focus is placed on interdisciplinary approaches. In 2020, the university founded the Institute for Advanced Studies (IAS), which primarily promotes interdisciplinary research projects.

Since its creation in 2006, the university has been awarded 15 ERC grants and it has established 22 industrial, public and public-private chairs, with 16 endowed chairs ongoing. In March 2021, the University of Luxembourg had 1,000 ongoing research projects and 114 Horizon 2020 projects. In 2022, university researchers produced 2,438 publications. While women make up 50% of PhD students, they represent only 39% of research scientists and just 21% of full professors. PhD students and postdoctoral researchers work on fixed-term contracts that cannot exceed five years. Of the researchers at the university, 1,199 are on fixed-term contracts, while 416 hold permanent positions.

== Demographics ==
As of May 2025, the University of Luxembourg's enrollment was 6700 students, including 1000 doctoral candidates, 2,500 staff, and more than 300 professors and senior lecturers.

In 2026, the university had 5,718 full-time equivalent students and a student–teacher ratio of 20. In 2026, 52% of students at the university were international students.

== Notable people ==
The University of Luxembourg has more than 19,000 alumni. This section lists selected faculty members and alumni who have received significant recognition in academia, public service, politics, or professional fields.

=== Notable faculty ===
- Alex Biryukov (Cryptographer)
- Robert Brisart (Philosopher)
- Emile Haag (Historian, national president of the confederation of government employees)
- Dietmar Heidemann (Philosopher)
- Norbert von Kunitzki (Economist, businessman and university president)
- Jean-Paul Lehners (Historian)
- Jeanne Peiffer (Historian of mathematics)
- Martin Schlichenmaier (Mathematician)
- Emma Schymanski (Chemist, environmental engineer)
- François Tavenas (Engineer and academic)
- Alexandre Tkatchenko (Physicist)
- Leon van der Torre (Computer scientist)
- Renée Wagener (Journalist, sociologist, historian, and former politician)
- Volker Zotz (Philosopher, religious studies scholar, Buddhologist)
- Björn Ottersten (Electrical engineer)

=== Notable alumni ===
- Djuna Bernard (Luxembourgish politician)
- Max Hahn (Luxembourgish politician)
- Philip Hoffmann (Member of the German Bundestag)
- Amin Mekki Medani (Sudanese lawyer, diplomat, human rights and political activist)
- Jean-Paul Pier (Mathematician)
- Jean-François Rischard (Economist, World Bank vice president)
