= Mária Patakyová =

Slovak lawyer, Ombudsman 2017-2020

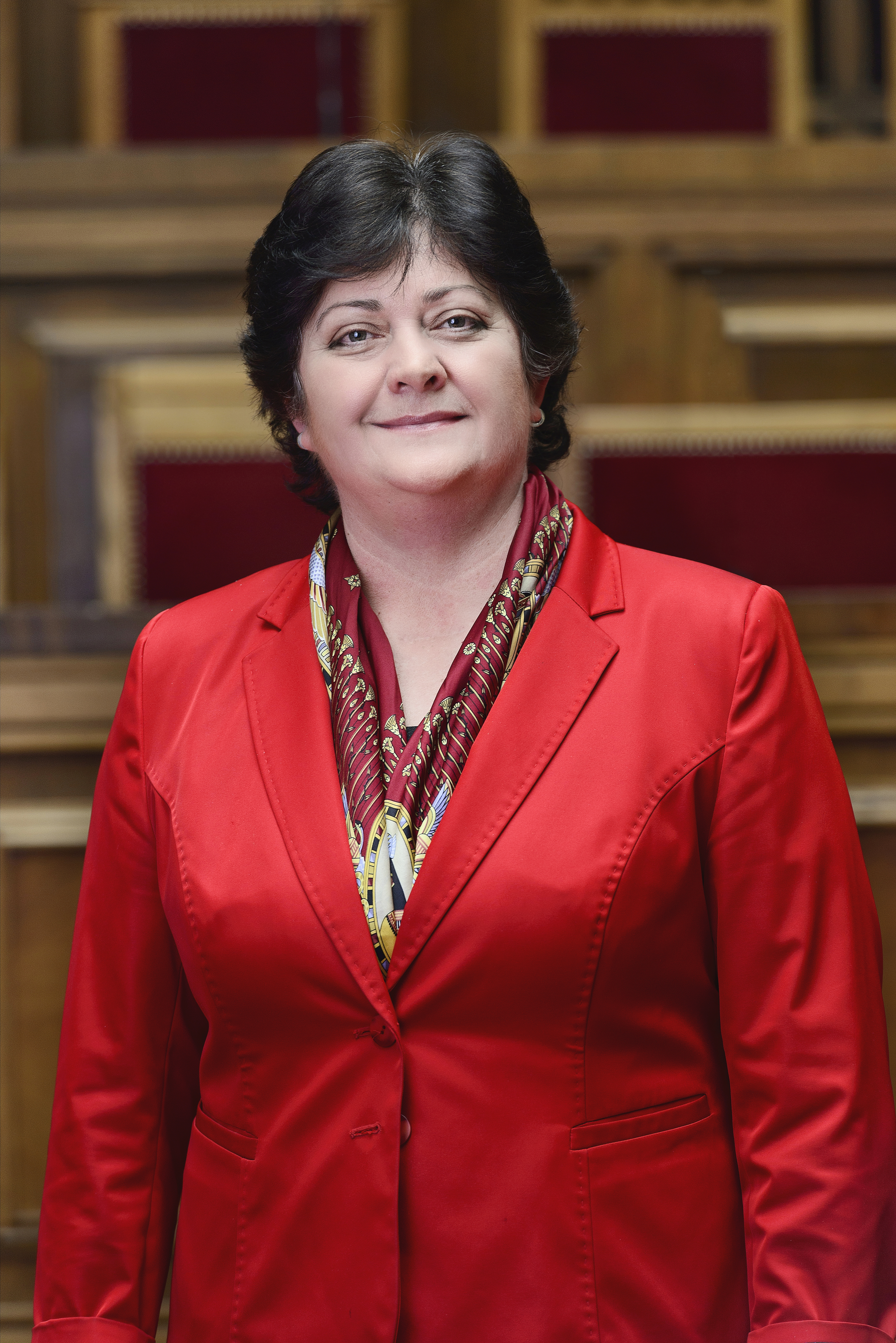
- Born: 14 May 1963 (age 63); Nové Zámky, Czechoslovakia
- Occupation: Lawyer
- Known for: Serving as the Ombudsman (2017-2022)

Mária Patakyová (born 14 May 1963) is a Slovak lawyer and law professor, who served as the Ombudsman in Slovakia from 2017 to 2022.

== Biography ==
Patakyová was born in Nové Zámky. She studied Law at the Comenius University and has been teaching commercial law at the same university since 1985. Between 2011 and 2017 she served as the Vice-Rector for legal affairs.

In 2015 she was nominated by Slovakia to the General Court of the European Union. Nonetheless, the court rejected the nomination due to Patakyová insufficient command of the French language.

In 2017 she was elected Ombudsman as a nominee of the MOST – HÍD party by the National Council. After her election, Patakyová stated she aims to be the "friend of the people" in the office, following the example of her Czech counterpart Otakar Motejl.

As the Ombusdsman she was active in fighting for improvement of childbirth conditions in Slovak public health institutions, justice for Romani women affected by compulsory sterilisation, protection of privacy rights of senior citizens. improvement of legal framework for legal adoptions, desegregation of the Slovak education system, more robust environmental protection framework, and improvement of the treatment of foreigners by the alien police. She was also active in pointing out the suspected infringements of human rights due to the COVID-19 pandemic contagion measures.

Due to her active participation at Pride parades in Slovakia as well as her general support for the LGBT community, she was target of severe criticism by the conservatives in the National Council.

Following the expiration of Patakyová's mandate by the end of March 2022, the National Council repeatedly failed to elect her successor. The seat of Ombudsman was, therefore, vacant for nearly eight months. In November 2022, the parliament elected Róbert Dobrovodský as the new Ombudsman.
