= Hannes Tretter =

Austrian lawyer and human rights expert (1951–2025)

Hannes Tretter (5 July 1951 – 17 March 2025) was an Austrian lawyer and human rights expert. He was Professor of Human Rights at the University of Vienna and was Director of the Ludwig Boltzmann Institut für Menschenrechte, which he cofounded with Felix Ermacora and Manfred Nowak in 1992. He was also an expert with the Organization for Security and Co-operation in Europe, a board member of the Austrian League for Human Rights and chaired the Steering Committee of the Austrian EUMC Focal Point.

Tretter earned his doctorate in law in 1975 and was employed at the University of Vienna from 1978 to 2025. He died on 17 March 2025, at the age of 73.
