= Felix Ermacora Human Rights Award =

Austrian human rights award

The Felix Ermacora Human Rights Award (German: Felix-Ermacora-Menschenrechtspreis) is an Austrian human rights award. It was established in 2005 by the Austrian People's Party, and is awarded each year by the Felix Ermacora Verein – Verein zur Wahrung und Förderung der Menschenrechte. There are two awards, one of them is awarded to journalists.

The award is named after Felix Ermacora, Austria's leading human rights expert of the 20th century.

== Awards ==
- 2005: Georg Sporschill and Friedrich Orter
- 2006: Hildegard Teuschl and Heinz Nußbaumer
- 2007: Franz Matscher and Gudrun Harrer
- 2008: Christian Strohal and Alfred Payrleitner
- 2010: Shirin Ebadi
