= Jean-Paul Lehners =

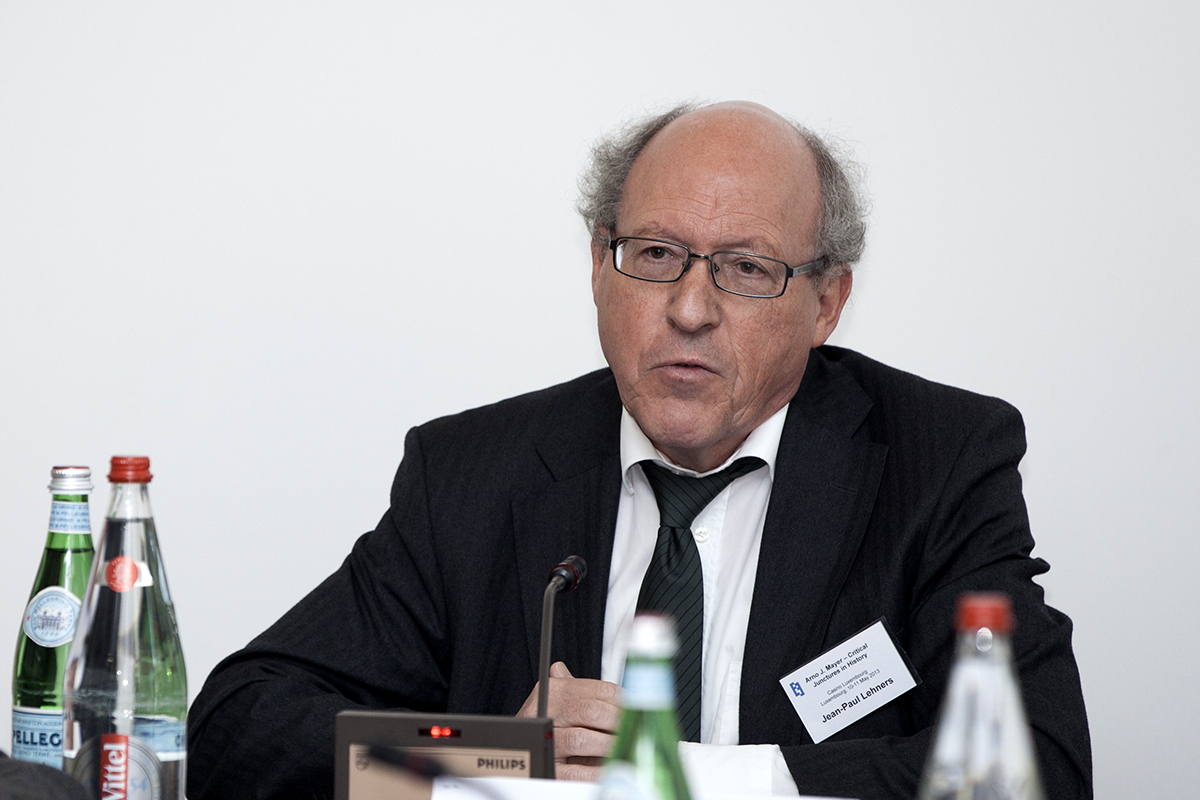
Jean-Paul Lehners (2013)

Jean-Paul Lehners (born 20 April 1948 in Grand Duchy of Luxembourg) is a Luxembourgish historian specialized in the field of global and demographic history. He is also involved in the study of human rights. Lehners is a professor emeritus of history and holder of the UNESCO Chair in Human Rights at the University of Luxembourg.

== Academic life ==
After completing the "Cours Supérieurs" (higher courses) in Luxembourg in 1967, Lehners studied in Strasbourg, France, as well as Vienna, Austria, between 1968 and 1973. In 1973, Lehners obtained a doctorate from the University of Vienna. From 1973 to 1975, Lehners worked as the assistant of Michael Mitterauer at the Institut für Wirtschafts- und Sozialgeschichte der Universität Wien. Between 1976 and 1994, Lehners was lecturing at the University of Trier on themes such as quantitative methods in history, historical demography, history of family structures, analysis of school manuals, fear & security from the 16th to 20th centuries, history of European expansions by texts and controversy on numbers in history between 1976 and 1994.

In 1975, Lehners completed his internship and became course responsible at Lycée Michel Rodange, where he worked until 1980. Afterwards, he moved to Lycée technique Michel Lucius and taught there until 1987, then moved back to his former institution, Lycée Michel-Rodange, and where he taught until 1995.

Between 1984 and 1987, Lehners taught at the Centre Universitaire; then became responsible for the course until 1990. Lehners obtained the title of professor in 1990 and taught at the Centre Universitaire and, from 2003 onwards, at the University of Luxembourg

Lehners became the vice-rector of the University of Luxembourg between 2003 and 2007. Since 2011, Lehners has been active as the first holder of the UNESCO Chair in Human Rights at the University of Luxembourg.

== Social work ==
Lehners holds the presidential title for Consultative Commission of Human Rights (Commission consultative des Droits de l'Homme), Justice and Peace Commission (Commission Justice et Paix) and is the honorary president of Omega 90.

Some other organizations Lehners took part in are listed below:

- Member of the National UNESCO Commission, Luxembourg, 2001-to date
- Member of the European Commission against Racism and Intolerance (ECRI), Council of Europe, 2011-to date
- Member of the Arbeitsgruppe "Menschenwürde und Menschenrechte" (Working group on human dignity and human rights) of the German Justice and Peace Commission, 2010-to date

== Awards ==
- Robert Krieps Award 1992 for the workgroup on "Histoire de l'industrialisation en Sarre-Lor-Lux" (informal group composed researchers, professors and students meeting several times a year and exchanging information and elaborating common projects of studies and research).
- Lion Award 2001 for the activities in the field of human dignity.

== Publications ==
Lehners is co-author of many books and author or co-author of a certain number of articles.

=== Books ===
- Kolonialismus, Imperialismus, Dritte Welt, (2 volumes), Salzburg (Wolfgang Neugebauer Verlag), 347 et 258 pages
- Sozialismus - das Ende einer Utopie?, Cahiers I.S.I.S. fascicule 1, (Publications du Centre Universitaire), 191 pages
- Passé et Avenir des Bassins Industriels en Europe, Cahiers d'Histoire 1, (Publications du Centre Universitaire), 430 pages
- Information Technologies for History Education, Cahiers d'Histoire 2, (Publications du Centre Universitaire)
- L'ONU, un instrument de paix au service de qui?, Cahiers I.S.I.S., fascicule VI, Publications du Centre Universitaire
- Héritages culturels dans la Grande Région Sarre-Lor-Lux-Rhénanie-Palatinat, Cahiers I.S.I.S., Fascicule IV, Publications du Centre Universitaire
- Régions, Nations, Mondialisation, Cahiers I.S.I.S., Fascicule V, Publications du Centre Universitaire
- Passé et avenir des bassins industriels en Europe. Aspects sociaux et environnementaux, Cahiers d'Histoire 3, (Publications du Centre Universitaire)
- Ethnic Conflicts and Civil Society. Proposals for a New Era in Eastern Europe, Ashgate, Aldershot/ Brookfiels USA/ Singapore/ Sidney
- L'Autriche, les Pays-Bas méridionaux et le duché de Luxembourg au 18e siècle, Cahiers d'Histoire 4, (Publications du Centre Universitaire)
- Les espaces méditerranéens, Cahiers I.S.I.S. 7, (Publications du Centre Universitaire)
- L'islam et l'espace euro-méditerranéen, Cahiers I.S.I.S. 8, (Publications du Centre Universitaire)
- Endettement, marginalité, pauvreté: Quels financements et refinancements du Tiers Monde ? Cahiers I.S.I.S. 11 (Publications du Centre Universitaire)
- New challenges in Human Rights, Cambridge University Press (in preparation)
- Rythmen der Globalisierung, Wien, Mandelbaum Verlag 2010

=== Articles ===
- 1973 Die Pfarre Stockerau im 17. und 18. Jahrhundert. Erste Resultate einer demographischen Studie. In: H. Helczmanovski (Hg): Beiträge zur Bevölkerungs- und Sozialgeschichte Öster¬reichs. München/Wien, p. 373-401
- 1973 Ein Beitrag zur Theorie der Unterentwicklung. A.G. Franks Thesen dargestellt am Beispiel Brasilien. In: Beiträge zur Historischen Sozialkunde (4), Wien, p. 68-71
- 1974 Haus und Familie im Markt Stockerau am Ende des 17. Jahrhunderts. In: Unsere Heimat. Zeitschrift des Vereins für Landeskunde von Niederösterreich und Wien 45, p. 222-235
- 1974 Familie und Sozialisation. In: Beiträge zur Historischen Sozialkunde (2), Wien, p. 42-44 (repris dans "école et vie")
- 1977 Neoimperialismus und Dritte Welt. Zur Theorie von Abhängigkeit und „Unterentwicklung" seit 1945 In: Alfred Bergmiller, Peter Feldbauer (Hg.): Kolonialismus, Imperialismus, Dritte Welt 1. Salzburg 1977, p. 175-212
- 1978 EDV-Einsatz im Projekt: Strukturwandel der Familie in Österreich seit dem 17. Jahrhundert. In: Franz Irsigler (Hg): Quantitative Methoden in der Wirtschafts- und Sozialgeschichte der Vorneuzeit. Stuttgart, p. 146-158
- 1987 La démographie historique: Une possibilité d'initiation au métier d'historien? A propos d'une expérience. In: A.L.G.H.: Annuaire 1987. Luxembourg, p. 61-66
- 1990 Les migrations à longue distance (1500-1900). Belgique et Grand-Duché de Luxembourg. In: Commission Internationale de Démographie historique (ed): Long distance migrations (1500-1900). Madrid, p. 45-60
- 1992 Lëtzebuerg an d'Lëtzebuerger am Zwete Weltkrich. E puer Iwwerleungen als Aféierung In: Roger Gallion: Stroossen. Seng Krichsaffer 1940-1945, p. 12-19
- 1993 A propos de la démographie historique au Luxembourg: sources, méthodes, problèmes In: Annuaire de l'Association luxembourgeoise de généalogie et d'héraldique, Luxembourg, p. 254-288
- 1994 The history of banks in Luxembourg, Histoire des banques au Luxembourg In: Manfred Pohl (ed): Handbook on the History of European Banks (Edward Arnold), p. 675-687
- 2000 Quelle école pour quelle société? In: Le Jeudi, Dossier Le Luxembourg au XXIe siècle, December
- 2001 Stroossen gëschter an haut In: 150 Joer Gemeng Stroossen 1850-200, p. 11-20
- 2006 Introduction to special issue: The varieties of family history. Dedicated to the memory of Tamara K. Hareven (1937-2002), In: The History of the Family, Volume 11, Number 3, 2006, p. 123-124
- 2009 Luxembourg : Content without reference? In: Vinodh Jaichand, Markku Suksi (eds) : 60 Years of the Universal Declaration of Human Rights in Europe. Antwerp/Oxford/Portland, pp. 73–84
- 2011 Human Rights Aspects in International Scientific Cooperation, in : Nova Acta Leopoldina NF 113, Nr. 387, 47-50
- 2011 Nationsbildung in Luxemburg von der Französischen Revolution bis zum Beginn des Zweiten Weltkriegs: Konzepte, Debatten, Forschungserträge, in: Jacques P. Leider et al. (éditeurs): Du Luxembourg à l'Europe. Hommage à Gilbert Trausch à l'occasion de son 80e anniversaire, Luxembourg 2011, p. 235-249
