= Léonce Bekemans =

Belgian academic (born 1950)

Léonce Bekemans (born 20 September 1950 in Bruges) is a Belgian economist and scholar of European studies. Since 2002, he holds the Jean Monnet Chair in "Globalisation, Intercultural Dialogue and Inclusiveness in the EU" at the University of Padua. He is a former professor at the College of Europe in Bruges, where he was associate professor 1991–95 and full professor 1995–2001. He has previously been a research fellow at the European University Institute.

He is also a visiting professor at the La Sapienza University and the Opole University, and has been Jean Monnet Visiting Professor of European Interdisciplinary Studies at the Polonia University. He is the president of the Ryckevelde Foundation, founded by Karel Verleye in 1956.

He received an MA in economics and a BA in philosophy, both from the Katholieke Universiteit Leuven in 1974. He received an MA in international studies from Johns Hopkins School of Advanced International Studies in 1976 and a PhD in economics from the European University Institute in 1982.

He is married to paediatrician Patrizia Morotti.
