= Manfred Nowak =

Austrian human rights lawyer (born 1950)

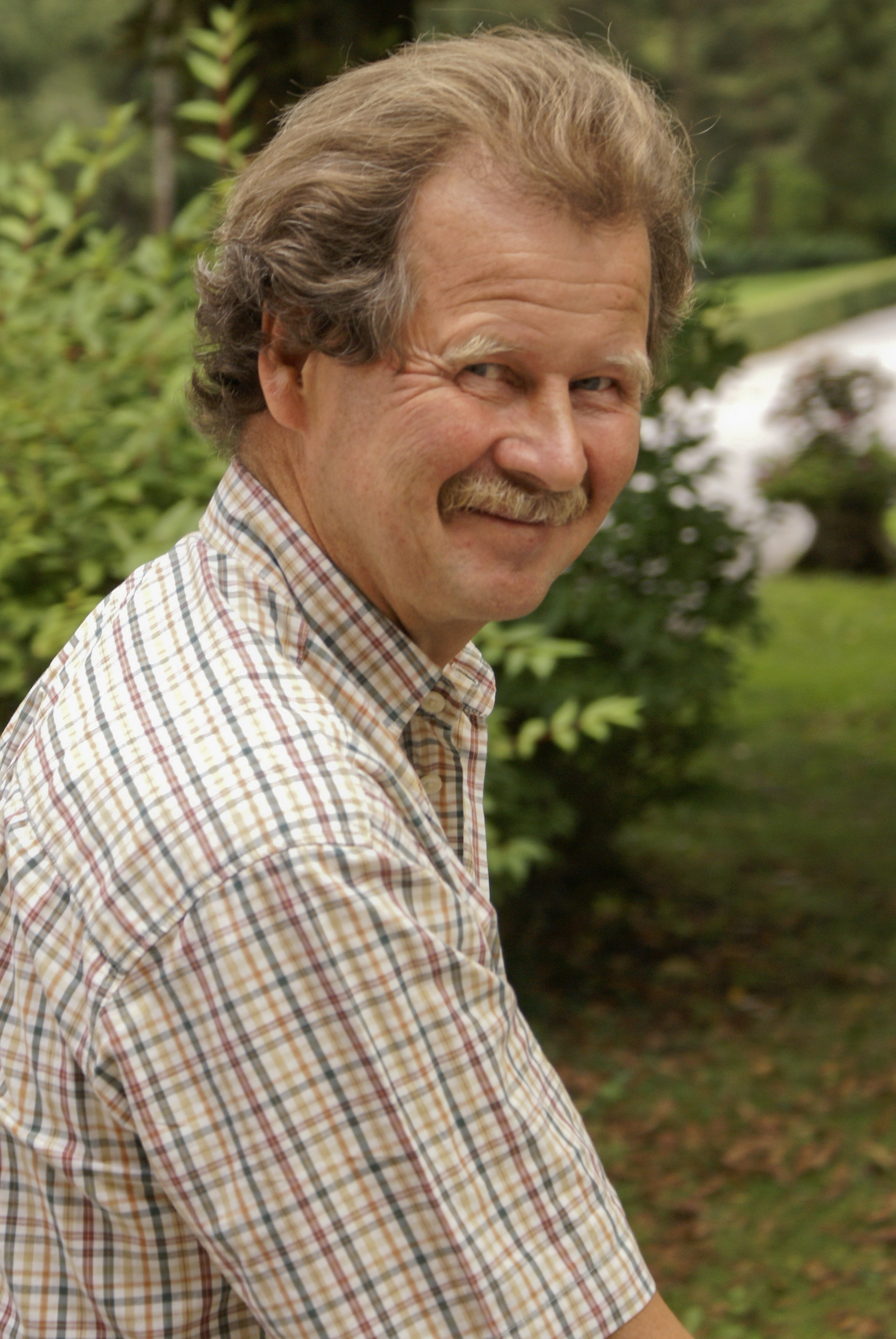
- At Salzburg Global Seminar 2007
- Born: 26 June 1950 (age 76); Bad Aussee, Austria
- Education: University of Vienna (LL.D.), Columbia University (LL.M.)
- Occupations: Secretary General, Global Campus of Human Rights, Professor of International Human Rights, University of Vienna
- Title: Univ.-Prof. Dr. Dr. h.c. mult.

Manfred Nowak (born 26 June 1950 in Bad Aussee) is an Austrian human rights expert, who served as the United Nations Special Rapporteur on Torture from 2004 to 2010. He is Secretary General of the Global Campus of Human Rights (formerly European Inter-University Centre for Human Rights and Democratisation, EIUC) in Venice, Italy, Professor of International Human Rights, and Scientific Director of the Vienna Master of Arts in Applied Human Rights at the University of Applied Arts in Vienna. He is also co-founder and former Director of the Ludwig Boltzmann Institute of Human Rights and a former judge at the Human Rights Chamber for Bosnia and Herzegovina. In 2016, he was appointed Independent Expert leading the United Nations Global Study on Children Deprived of Liberty.

== Career ==
Nowak was a student of Felix Ermacora, and cooperated with him until Ermacora's death in 1995. They co-founded the Ludwig Boltzmann Institut für Menschenrechte (with Hannes Tretter) in 1992.

In addition to his function as Professor of Constitutional and International Law and Human Rights at the University of Vienna, Nowak was:

- Director of the Netherlands Institute of Human Rights (SIM) at Utrecht University, Netherlands (1987–1989)
- Head of the Law Department of the Austrian Federal Academy of Public Administration in Vienna, Austria (1989–2001)
- Olof Palme Professor of Human Rights and Humanitarian Law at Lund University, Sweden (2002–2003)
- Visiting Professor at EIUC in Venice, Italy (2004)
- Swiss Chair of Human Rights at the Graduate Institute of International and Development Studies in Geneva, Switzerland (2008–2009)
- Austrian Visiting Chair at Stanford University, Palo Alto, USA (2014).

Since 2016, he is the Secretary General of the Global Campus of Human Rights in Venice, Italy, which is responsible for eight Master's programmes on human rights in all world regions, and many other activities in the field of human rights and democracy education. He regularly teaches at various other universities, including the American University in Washington, DC.

As United Nations Special Rapporteur on Torture, Nowak was one of the five authors of a United Nations report on the detention of captives at the United States naval base at Guantánamo Bay, Cuba (2006) and one of four authors of a UN report on secret detention in the fight against terrorism (2010).

In 2005, Nowak visited China, claiming that torture remained "widespread" there. He also complained of Chinese officials interfering with his work.

In September 2006, he alleged that torture may be more of a problem in Iraq since the Iraq War than under Saddam Hussein's regime. Much of the torture, he argued, is carried out by security forces, militias and insurgents.

From 6 to 9 November 2006, he presented at the international panel at Gadjah Mada University for adoption of Yogyakarta Principles and has become one of the 29 signatories.

In February 2008, Nowak was a founding member of the 'Research Platform Human Rights in the European Context' at the University of Vienna.

As internationally renowned expert in the field of human rights, he carried out various independent expert functions for the United Nations, the Council of Europe, the European Union, the OSCE as well as for NGOs and in the corporate sector. The most important expert functions are the following:

- 1986–1993: Member of the Austrian Delegation to the UN Commission on Human Rights
- 1993: Coordinator of NGO-Input into the Second World Conference on Human Rights in Vienna
- 1993–2001: Expert Member of the UN Working Group on Involuntary or Enforced Disappearances
- 1994–1997: UN Expert in charge of the Special Process on Missing Persons or Enforced Disappearances
- since 1995: Member and Honorary Member of the International Commission of Jurists (ICJ), Geneva
- 1996–2003: Judge at the Human Rights Chamber for Bosnia-Herzegovina in Sarajevo
- 2000–2015: Head of an Independent Human Rights Commission at the Austrian Ministry of Interior and the Austrian Ombudsman Board (National Preventive Mechanism)
- 2001–2006: UN Expert on Disappearances
- 2002–2006: Member of the EU Network of Independent Experts on Fundamental Rights
- 2004–2010: United Nations Special Rapporteur on Torture and other Cruel, Inhuman or Degrading Treatment
- 2008–2010: Member and Rapporteur of a Panel of Eminent Persons
- since 2010: Vice-President of the Austrian UNESCO-Commission
- since 2011: Member of the Advisory Board of the European Center for Constitutional and Human Rights (ECCHR), Berlin
- 2012–2017: Vice-Chair of the Management Board of the EU Agency for Fundamental Rights, Vienna
- since 2012: Chair of an International Review Committee on assessing compliance by the Government of Taiwan with the two UN Human Rights Covenants
- since 2012: Member of the OMV Advisory Board for Resourcefulness
- since 2016: Independent Expert leading the UN Global Study on Children Deprived of Liberty

Nowak is author of more than 600 publication in the field of constitutional, administrative and international law, human rights as well as development studies.

Key publications:

- 2003: Introduction to the International Human Rights Regime, Leiden (Spanish translation 2009, Chinese translation 2010), 365 pages
- 2005: UN Covenant on Civil and Political Rights – CCPR Commentary, 2nd edition, Kehl am Rhein/Strassbourg/Arlington 1989, 946 pages
- 2008: The United Nations Convention against Torture – A Commentary (together with Elizabeth McArthur), Oxford, 1649 pages
- 2012: All Human Rights for All – Vienna Manual on Human Rights (edited together with Karolina Januszewski, Tina Hofstaetter), Vienna/Graz, 672 pages
- 2015: Menschenrechte – Eine Antwort auf die wachsende oekonomische Ungleichheit, Vienna/Hamburg, 176 pages
- 2017: Human Rights or Global Capitalism, The Limits of Privatisation, Pennsylvania, 256 pages
- 2017: Torture – An Expert's Confrontation with an Everyday Evil, Pennsylvania, 191 pages (forthcoming)

== Honours ==
In 1994, Nowak was awarded the UNESCO Prize for the Teaching of Human Rights (honorable mention), in recognition of the outstanding contribution to the development of the teaching of human rights.

In 2007, he received the Bruno Kreisky Prize for Human Rights for outstanding achievements for services to international human rights and the University of Oslo’s Human Rights Award for his "defense of fundamental human rights" in 2013.

In 2014, Manfred Nowak was honored with the Otto Hahn Peace Medal.

== See also ==
- Enhanced interrogation techniques
- Extraordinary rendition
- War on terror
