= Academia Mexicana de Derechos Humanos =

- Abbreviation: AMDH
- Formation: 1984
- Purpose: Human Rights monitoring and promotion in Mexico
- Location: Mexico City, Mexico,

Academia Mexicana de Derechos Humanos MEXICANOS (English: Mexican Academy of Human Rights) is a human rights group based in Mexico. According to its website, the Academia Mexicana de Derechos Humanos is a non governmental, independent and plural organization founded in 1984 that has contributed in an active manner to the creation of a vigorous pro-human rights movement in Mexico.

In 2012 AMDH is awarded UNESCO/Bilbao Prize for the Promotion of a Culture of Human Rights.

== Objectives ==
As of 1995 the objectives of AMDH include the following:

- Promote the investigation, analysis, and teaching of human rights
- Strengthen communication and contacts between the people and national, international, and foreign institutions that work towards the goals investigating, teaching, and promoting human rights
- Compile information and documents about the situation of human rights in the world in general and Latin America and Mexico in particular
- Disseminate and publish the results of investigations and discussions regarding the problem of human rights
- Collaborate with specialized institutions, national and international, in the preparation and production of didactic materials that teach human rights
- Promote, and in this case, organize events, seminars, symposiums, workshops, lectures, and courses regarding the problem of human rights, and in general everything relating to the aforementioned topic

== Projects ==
AMDH has produced printed materials, such as texts, manuals, guides, bulletins, and folios, as well as audiovisual material that are in line with its stated goals of defending human rights through the mediums of communication and new technologies. Recorded testimonies, lectures and conferences make up part of the groups audiovisual repertoire.

Since its inception AMDH has devoted itself to the plights of indigenous peoples and migrants. It also has participated in the movement against the exploitation of children and has rapports with the movement towards the promotion of women’s rights.

The group also formed the Centro de Documentación “Guillermo Bonfil Batalla”, after the Mexican ethnologist. Center collects information on human rights from all over Latin America. The Center currently houses more than 6,000 books, a video library with almost 300 videos, and a historic Documents Center with 12,000 documents from the 16th century up to date.

AMDH has also sponsored scholarly projects, conferences, expositions, and film festivals. It is also active in the promotion of courses focusing on the awareness of human rights, notably at the Universidad Nacionál Autónoma de Mexico. Below is the list of objectives of one such partnership between AMDH, UNAM, as well as Red de Profesores e Investigadores de Educación en Derechos Humanos de México.

1) Stress the definition and implementation of an integral public policy in the field of human rights education and the defense of the right to education

2) Construct a follow-up of the responsibilities of the Mexican state with relation to its national and international issues in general education, and in particular, human rights education.

3) Create and validate through participation and democratic proposals, practices and initiatives in human rights education and democracy

4) Contribute, monitor, and further develop, through evaluation, elaboration and application of elements from the National Plan or Program of human rights education.

5) Articulate actions with the state, civil- state organizations, educational institutions of all levels, syndicates, and all actors of society, as means to further a culture of human rights and democracy, as well as its fluidity and use.

6) Study, analyze, and interchange theoretical and methodological proposals and related experiences in the teaching and investigation of education in the human rights and democracy, from general cases of understanding in various multicultural dimensions and more generally, in our culture.

7) Promote the teaching and recognition of human rights education and democracy at all levels of formal and informal education.

8) Contribute and articulate efforts on behalf of other educational organizations in human rights education in Latin America with the purpose of strengthening human rights education and democracy from a Latin American perspective.

9) Disseminate the investigative work and information compiled by members of the organization and contribute to the strengthening of a democratic culture.

Other critical projects include the 2004 World Conference of the International Association of Educators for Peace. The Conference was spearheaded by AMDH and The Commission of Defense of Human Rights of the State of Guerrero. Various International Human Rights organizations attended the conference, including famed human rights figures like Rigoberta Menchú Tum, Rodolfo Stavenhagen, Adolfo Pérez Esquivel, Danielle Mitterrand, and Nelson Mandela.

Additionally, the AMDH, has produced several pamphlets, booklets, and journals focusing on a series of issues with connection to human rights. These include electoral campaigns and women's rights.
