= Héctor Fix-Zamudio =

Mexican jurist (1924–2021)

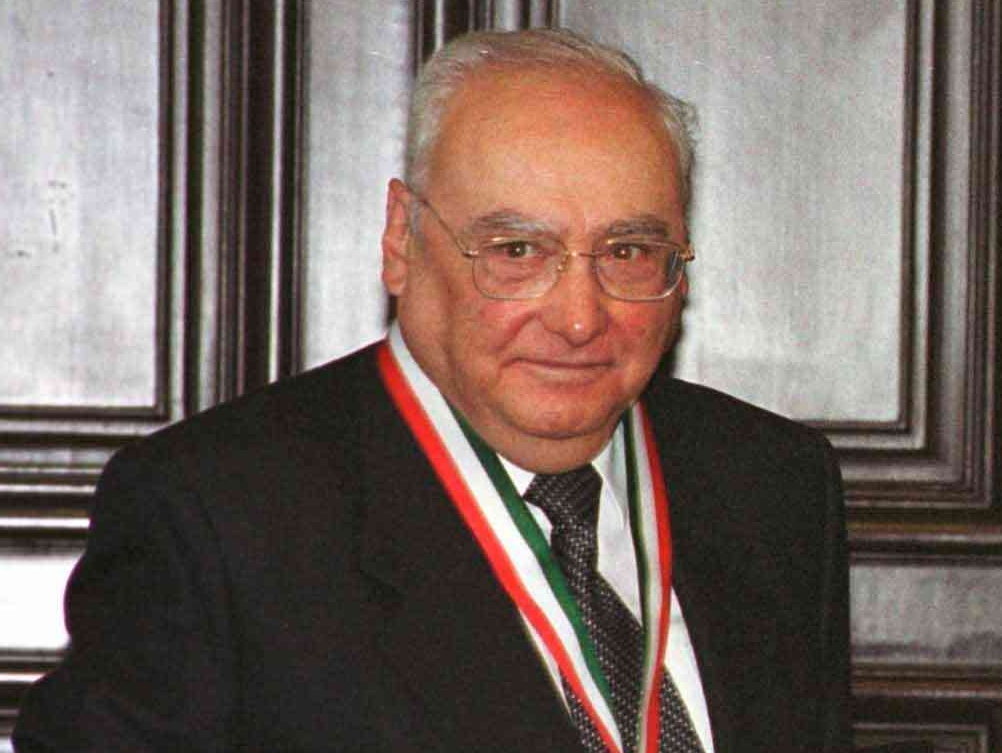
Héctor Fix-Zamudio receiving the Belisario Domínguez Medal in 2002

Héctor Fix-Zamudio (24 September 1924 – 27 January 2021) was a Mexican jurist.

== Education ==
Born in the downtown quarter of Mexico City, Fix-Zamudio studied law at the National Autonomous University of Mexico (UNAM), where he earned his bachelor's degree in 1956 and his doctorate (magna cum laude) in 1972. He also received honorary doctoral degrees from the University of Seville (Spain), the University of Colima (Mexico), the Universidad Externado de Colombia, the Pontifical Catholic University of Peru, the University of Puebla (Mexico), the Complutense University of Madrid (Spain), Los Andes Peruvian University (Peru), and the Centro de Investigación y Desarrollo del Estado de Michoacán (Mexico).

== Professional career ==
From 1945 to 1964 Fix-Zamudio held various positions in the Mexican judiciary, culminating with a position as clerk to the Supreme Court of Justice of the Nation. In 1964 he accepted a full-time research position at the UNAM's Legal Research Institute (Instituto de Investigaciones Jurídicas), then known as the Institute of Comparative Law (Instituto de Derecho Comparado). He also served as the institute's director from 1966 to 1978. In 1981 he was elected to the UNAM's Governing Board (Junta de Gobierno), where he served until 1988.

In 1974 he was chosen as the first president of the Ibero-American Constitutional Law Institute, a position he held until 2002 when he was named honorary president. He was elected to serve as a judge on the Inter-American Court of Human Rights from 1987 to 1997, including two terms as its president. He served on the United Nations Sub-Commission on Prevention of Discrimination and Protection of Minorities from 1998 to 2001. He was a member of the Consultative Council of the National Human Rights Commission since 1998.

== Awards and recognitions ==
On 23 October 1974 he was elected to the Colegio Nacional. The awards he won included the National Prize for History, Social Science and Philosophy, the National Jurisprudence Prize, awarded in 1994 by the Mexican Bar Association (1994), and the Senate's Belisario Domínguez Medal of Honour in 2002. In 1986 he was awarded the UNESCO Prize for Human Rights Education, and he later served on the jury for that prize for four years from 1988 to 1991.

In recognition of his work in the field, the UNAM's Legal Research Institute currently awards the annual Héctor Fix-Zamudio International Prize for Legal Research.

== Death ==
Héctor Fix-Zamudio died at the age of 96 of heart failure on 27 January 2021.

== Publications ==
Fix-Zamudio published 20 books and 250 articles on legal topics, including amparo, constitutional law and human rights.

Preceded by José Ezequiel Iturriaga Sauco	Belisario Domínguez Medal of Honor; 2002	Succeeded by Luis González y González
