= Hermagoras =

Hermagoras may refer to:

- Hermagoras of Amphipolis (3rd century BC), stoic philosopher
- Hermagoras of Temnos (1st century BC), rhetorician
- Hermagoras of Aquileia (3rd century AD), first bishop of Aquileia and saint
- Hermagoras (insect), a genus of Asian stick insects in the tribe Lonchodini
