= Ludwig Boltzmann Institut für Menschenrechte =

Vienna-based research institute

The Ludwig Boltzmann Institute of Human Rights (BIM; German: Ludwig Boltzmann Institut für Menschenrechte) is a Vienna-based research institute affiliated with the Austrian Ludwig Boltzmann Gesellschaft, that specializes in the area of human rights.

== History ==
It was founded in 1992 by Felix Ermacora, Manfred Nowak and Hannes Tretter, all three Professors of Law at the University of Vienna. Felix Ermacora († 1995) served as its first director, followed by Manfred Nowak and Hannes Tretter as joint scientific directors (2009–2019). Since 2019 Michael Lysander Fremuth has been scientific director. Fremuth also holds a professorship for Fundamental and Human Rights at the University of Vienna. The institute is located at Freyung 6 in the city center of Vienna/Austria. It cooperates with the Institut für Staats- und Verwaltungsrecht at the University of Vienna.

In 1993, the Institute organised and coordinated the activities of more than 3,000 NGO delegates during the World Conference on Human Rights. In 2002, the Institute became a general mandate by the European Commission for the execution of twinning projects. Since the establishment of the research platform Human Rights in the European Context in 2008, the Institute coordinates the research platform that brings together researchers of six faculties of the University of Vienna.

== Structure ==
The institute's day-to-day work is managed by the Managing Director Patricia Mussi-Mailer. There are the following research areas within the Institute:

- Human Dignity and Public Security
- Development Cooperation and Business
- European Neighbourhood and Integration Policy
- Anti Discrimination, Diversity and Asylum
- Women's Rights, Children's Rights and Trafficking in Human Beings
- Human Rights Education
- Digital Rights

== Awards ==
In 1995, the institute was awarded the human rights award "Bruno-Kreisky Preis für Verdienste um die Menschenrechte". In 2007, the same prize was awarded to the institute's former scientific co-director Manfred Nowak.

== Publications ==
In 1999, the Institute became co-editor of "Jahrbuch Menschenrechte" a yearbook on human rights.

Between 1999 and 2007, the Institute published its own study series with the publisher Verlag Österreich. Since 2008, the Institute publishes with the Austrian Neuer Wissenschaftlicher Verlag (NWV) the studie series "Studienreihe des Ludwig Boltzmann Instituts für Menschenrechte" (available internationally via Intersentia publishers): (selection)

- Universal Criminal Jurisdiction as Mechanism and Part of the Global Struggle to Combat Impunity with Particular Regards to the Crime of Torture, Manfred Nowak, Fiona Steinert and Hannes Tretter (Eds), Vienna 2012 (Studienreihe, Volume 23)
- A World Court of Human Rights – Consolidated Statute and Commentary, Julia Kozma, Manfred Nowak, Martin Scheinin, Vienna 2011 (Studienreihe, Volume 22)
- Extraordinary Renditions and the Protection of Human Rights, Vienna, 2010 (Studienreihe, Volume 20)

In addition, there are many publications by the institute's staff in addition to this study series.
