= Humboldt-Viadrina School of Governance =

Coordinates: 52.5184°N 13.3805°E

- Berlin, Germany

Information
- Motto: Denken. Handeln. Wirken. German
- Established: November 2003
- President: Gesine Schwan
- Campus: Urban
- Website: www.humboldt-viadrina.org

The Humboldt-Viadrina School of Governance was a higher education school in Berlin, Germany from 2003 to 2014, established through a unique partnership between two public universities: Viadrina European University in Frankfurt (Oder) and the Humboldt University of Berlin, one of Berlin's oldest universities. Dr. Gesine Schwan, a two-time presidential nominee of the Social Democratic Party of Germany (SPD) was the founder and president of the school. The School aimed to be a forum that contributes to the development of intelligent solutions for current social problems.

== Academic programs ==
The School offered two master's programs, both consisting of part-time on-campus sessions in Berlin and distance learning online. The degree programs continue to be administered by the European University Viadrina Frankfurt (Oder). Former and current students receive a degree from both the Humboldt University Berlin and Viadrina University.

== Admissions ==
A selection committee composed of representatives from both universities reviewed all the applications received.

== Resources ==
The Humboldt-Viadrina building included a library that served as an interdisciplinary resource on the subject of civil society, philanthropy and the nonprofit sector.

== External links & references ==
- http://www.humboldt-viadrina.org/
