= Human Rights Impact Assessment =

Human Rights Impact Assessment is a process for systematically identifying, predicting and responding to the potential human rights impacts of a business operation, capital project, government policy, or trade agreement. It is designed to complement a company or government's other impact assessment and due diligence processes and to be framed by appropriate international human rights principles and conventions. It is also rooted in the realities of the particular project by incorporating the context within which it will operate from the outset, and by engaging directly with those peoples whose rights may be at risk.

Conducting a Human Rights Impact Assessment is an integrated part of the UN Guiding Principles on Business and Human Rights (UNGPs), which is the "authoritative global standard on the respective roles of businesses and governments in helping [to] ensure that companies respect human rights in their own operations and through their business relationships."

== Corporate Human Rights Impact Assessment ==
=== Background ===
In 2005, the Secretary-General of the United Nations appointed John Ruggie to the post of Special Representative on the issue of human rights and transnational corporations. His mandate was, “to identify and clarify standards of corporate responsibility and accountability for transnational corporations and other business enterprises with regard to human rights”. This broad task included a request "to develop materials and methodologies for undertaking human rights impact assessments of the activities of transnational corporations and other business enterprises". The mandate was set to expire in June 2008, but Ruggie was granted a three-year extension.

That extension culminated in a set of Guiding Principles on Business and Human Rights (the UNGPs) that sets out expectations for companies and governments for what it means to respect human rights in a business setting. Part of the business responsibility is to conduct a "human rights due diligence" as described in operational principle 17: "In order to identify, prevent and mitigate adverse human rights impacts, and to account for their performance, business enterprises should carry out human rights due diligence. The process should include assessing actual and potential human rights impacts, integrating and acting upon the findings, and tracking as well as communicating their performance."

Little guidance existed to define the process of assessing human rights impacts when Ruggie was called on to establish methodologies, and he stated publicly in 2006 that "the dimensions of this task unfortunately turn out to be beyond the resource and time constraints of the mandate". However, Ruggie committed to "closely monitor two ongoing efforts" to establish HRIA methodologies, specifically, the efforts of the Danish Institute for Human Rights and the International Finance Corporation, who were each working on methodologies for human rights assessment. In June 2011, the United Nations Human Rights Council unanimously endorsed the Guiding Principles. Neither the IFC nor the Danish Institute had produced a field-tested methodology that could serve as a guide for practitioners.

In 2011, the OECD adopted its updated Guidelines for Multinational Enterprises (MNE), which now included a human rights chapter that mirrors the UNGPs. The European Commission has also strongly committed itself to implement the UNGPs and "promote the uptake of the implementation of the Guiding Principles among EU countries and enterprises" and features them prominently in the EU Commission's Strategy on CSR. The Equator Principles and FAO have also incorporated assessment of human rights impacts into their project and loan requirements. This has increased the demand for clear guidance on how HRIA is conducted.

In March 2011, the Global Reporting Initiative (GRI) augmented its reporting standards to include a Human Rights Impact Assessment requirement. GRI now has 11 human rights standards (up from two), the 10th of which calls on companies to state what percentage of operations have been subject to human rights impact assessment.

=== Methodologies ===
A publicly available, peer-reviewed methodology for HRIA is published in the Environmental Impact Assessment Review. This publication was based on the work of a Denver, Colorado-based think tank, Nomogaia, which developed a toolkit for HRIA accompanied by a comprehensive database of case studies available to the public. This toolkit incorporates an extensive "Rightsholder Engagement" process, also present in the Salcito et al. methodology, which aims to incorporate the views and experiences of the most vulnerable members of impacted communities.

The Danish Institute for Human Rights has created two tools — a "Quick Check" that could be conducted from the confines of a corporate office, and a Human Rights Compliance Assessment (HRCA) tool. Only the Quick Check is publicly available, and companies sign agreements vowing not to publish or share any element of the HRCA reports they create. The HRCA is described by the Danish Institute as "a comprehensive tool designed to detect human rights risks in company operations. It covers all internationally recognized human rights and their impact on all stakeholders, including employees, local communities, customers, and host governments. The tool incorporates a database of approximately 200 questions and 1,000 indicators, each measuring the implementation of human rights in company policies and procedures. The database incorporates the Universal Declaration of Human Rights and more than 80 human rights treaties and ILO conventions". Although no HRCAs have been published, the Danish Institute states that "hundreds of companies" have used it.

Rights & Democracy (International Centre for Human Rights and Democratic Development) was a Canadian institution created through an Act of Parliament in 1988 that was dissolved in 2012. Rights & Democracy initiated a multi-year research initiative in 2004 with the objective of creating a community-based human rights impact assessment (HRIA) methodology and guiding tool. After initial methodologies were developed and tested, a third version of the methodology was released in 2011 called Getting it Right, which has been relaunched through an Oxfam partnership. The site guided users through a six step process, including an interactive tool to select the specific rights of concern and generate tailored interview protocols for communities, companies, and government actors that can be adapted to specific field contexts during the investigation phase.

The International Finance Corporation (IFC), in collaboration with the London-based International Business Leaders Forum (IBLF) produced a Guide to Human Rights Impact Assessment and Management Road-Testing Draft in August 2007, which it updated in June 2012 Eni announced in January 2010 that it had piloted the IFC/IBLF tool, and the IBLF reports that other companies have also been part of a road-testing process. and again in June 2012. No road-testing of this tool has ever been announced or made public.

Washington, D.C.-based law firm Foley Hoag conducts Human Rights Impact Assessments, which are confidential, with the exception of its HRIA on BP's Tangguh project in Papua, Indonesia. The Executive Summary to that assessment was available online for several years but is no longer available.

On Common Ground, a Vancouver, British Columbia, Canada-based consulting group, was hired to conduct a Human Rights Impact Assessment for the Marlin mine in Guatemala, owned by Goldcorp. The report was ultimately concluded to be a Human Rights Assessment, because assessors could not contrast baseline with change to establish impacts. The assessors also noted that the report could not be considered an impact assessment because the most significantly impacted rightsholder group, the Sipacapa people, were not interviewed or engaged during the assessment process. The methodology used by On Common Ground, as the document states, incorporated the Danish Institute's Compliance Assessment. It involved interviews (one-on-one and in focus groups) with nearly 200 people. Assessors conducted thoughtful analysis of the tools, standards, and guides used and were reflective of the report's strengths and weaknesses. Commissioned years after production (and community revolt) had begun at the mine, local conditions and project design had all changed drastically by the time assessors arrived. Further complicating the assessment, the mine's EIA was faulty and peppered with gaps. The HRA identified those gaps and went to the expense of commissioning a follow-up environmental study to verify, create, and update information that was not extant or usable in the original environmental impact assessment.

In December 2015, GLOBAL CSR publicized a web-based Human Rights Impact Assessment Tool, meant to allow for storing, managing, and reporting actions in relation to the assessment. It has not yet been implemented or publicly validated. They introduced a new tool in 2021 called SEE impacts which has been implemented by some EU based firms as a CSDDD compliant option.

=== Case studies ===
In addition to the Marlin HRA and the BP Executive Summary of HRIA, fourteen corporate HRIA case studies are publicly available. Seven were produced by Canadian non-profit, Rights & Democracy, two by Oxfam America, four were produced by Nomogaia, and one was made available by consulting firm TwentyFifty.

Rights & Democracy published a collection of case studies in 2007, assessing foreign investment projects in the Philippines (mining), Tibet (surveillance technology), the Democratic Republic of the Congo (mining), Argentina (water privatization), and Peru (mining). In all examples, except Tibet, companies participated in the assessment by providing information, interviews, and feedback on various draft texts. The studies were used differently by the communities that produced them. In Peru, the impact assessment resulted in an ongoing dialogue with company representatives. In the case of Argentina, the assessment formed the basis of an amicus curiae submitted by civil society to an arbitration process between European companies and the government of Argentina. In the Philippine case, the assessment was submitted to the United Nations Committee on Racism as a shadow report. Each of the participating communities reported that the experience had offered them a constructive means to advocate for their human rights. Oxfam America completed an impact assessment focused on migrant labor in the tobacco-producing areas of the southern United States using the Rights and Democracy tool. The final report inspired the CEO of Reynolds Tobacco to issue a call for industry-wide reforms. In another example, the Carter Center, is currently using the R&D methodology to carry an HRIA in the Democratic Republic of the Congo.

Nomogaia has published each HRIA upon completion and monitors activities to gauge changes in corporate behavior, policies, and performance. The HRIA for Dole Food Company depicted the human rights impacts of Dole's pineapple operations in northern Costa Rica, identifying community relations as a weak spot in human rights due diligence, while finding labor rights well protected. The HRIA for Paladin Energy assessed the impacts of a uranium mine on a rural Malawian community that had been untouched by industrialization. Major human rights risks included impacts associated with HIV/AIDS, inadequate communication, and gender discrimination. Monitoring showed significant improvements in HIV management, while environmental and financial disclosure continued to lag. Nomogaia presented these shortcomings as negatively impacting the right to public participation and, potentially, the right to a clean environment. Nomogaia's Green Resources HRIA was conducted a decade after the company had developed pine and eucalyptus plantations in southern Tanzania, but prior to large-scale harvesting. Assessment revealed major human rights violations, from inadequate housing, transportation, food and wages, to failure to uphold occupational health and safety standards and provide clean water, to breaches of labor contracts and international commitments. Monitoring revealed major improvements in wages, food, and transportation and minor improvements in housing. The right to water remains unfulfilled, according to the latest HRIA Monitoring report, updated December 2010.

The TwentyFifty HRIA was produced for adventure tourism firm Kuoni, for its Kenya operations.

Nestle produced a "Human rights white paper" in December 2013 detailing its pilot efforts to conduct human rights due diligence at several of its operations. The effort has been criticized by some NGOs for neglecting the Right to Water. However, it offers a candid description of HRIA in process, including describing the pitfalls of cutting corners.

== Human Rights Impact Assessments of Governmental Policies or Programmes ==
=== Background ===
HRIAs of government actions have tended to focus on the impact of trade agreements, policies, and projects. As with corporate HRIAs, government HRIAs aim to inform decision makers and rightsholders of probable impacts so that they can improve the draft agreement or proposal in such a way as to reduce potential negative effects and increase positive ones. A few have focused on other aspects of public policy, such as the 2014 assessment of the human rights impacts of Intellectual Property in agriculture, the methodology for which was developed by the Quaker UN Office and the Berne Declaration.

=== HRIAs of Trade Agreements ===
Context and history

For trade agreements, economic impact assessments, which predict the likely input of trade agreements on the economy, production, employment, and welfare, have become an established science in the field. Calls for environmental and social impact assessments gained strength in the 1990s. Today, Canada, Norway, the United States and a handful of other developed countries regularly undertake national environmental reviews of trade policies. The discussion is also live in Switzerland. The European Union routinely undertakes Sustainability Impact Assessments of planned new trade agreements. In the trade field, Human Rights Impact Assessment is the most recent iteration of impact assessment for trade agreements and policy decisions, the earliest of which was economic assessment.

Globally, however, the social and other impacts of trade negotiations and agreements are still addressed ad hoc. This is in spite of the fact that, by virtue of their obligations under human rights treaties, all States must carry out prior human rights assessments of planned policies and programmes. Human rights also bring economic and social benefits by recalling the necessity of going beyond aggregate models to identify differential impacts on different sectors of the population, and by calling for particular attention to be paid to vulnerable groups.

The earliest call for HRIA of trade agreements emerged in 2001 in a report of the High Commissioner for Human Rights. The report sought to analyze the human rights impacts of the Trade-Related Aspects of Intellectual Property Rights (TRIPS) agreement. Almost immediately on the heels of that report, the Norwegian Agency for Development Cooperation (NORAD) developed a "Handbook in Human Rights Impact Assessment" (reference and elaboration below).

The former UN Special Rapporteur on the Right to Food, Olivier De Schutter, drafted Guidelines for Human Rights Impacts of Trade Agreements in 2011. The Guidelines were presented to the UN Human Rights Council in Geneva in June 2012 and in 2018 are still the main guidelines for HRIAs in this area.

Some of the most comprehensive work on HRIAs for Trade Agreements has been conducted by UN staffer Simon Walker, Warwick Law Professor James Harrison (independently) and Caroline Dommen.

The International Federation for Human Rights (FIDH) and 3D -> THREE have been amongst the vocal proponents of HRIA for Trade Agreements, documenting both the need for such assessments, and the progress made in the field. The UN Committee on Economic, Social and Cultural Rights has called on States to carry out impact assessments, as has the Committee on the Rights of the Child. Many observers regret that the Office of the High Commissioner for Human Rights does not take a more pro-active role to preventing adverse human rights effects of economic policies, which the Office could do through more actively calling for HRIAs.

Completed HRIAs of trade agreements

Some governmental or intergovernmental organizations have carried out HRIAs of trade agreements, to mixed reception. The Canada–Colombia Free Trade Agreement, requires the governments of both Canada and Colombia to produce an annual human rights impact assessment of the FTA. The first assessment reports were due in 2012. Observers are however unsatisfied with the process, which they feel does not enhance the human rights aspects of the CCFTA. Similarly, critics note that the EU Sustainability Impact Assessments do not adequately reflect human rights standards and methodology.

In 2017, the UN Economic Commission for Africa published a Human Rights Impact Assessment of the African Continental Free Trade Area (CFTA) Whilst this looks at some areas, such as the impact on informal cross-border traders, in detail, no field studies were carried out and critics point out that it did not elicit sufficient breadth of participation in its preparation. Nevertheless, its findings set out an important roadmap, particularly (as noted below) for ongoing monitoring of the CFTA.

=== Methodologies and case studies ===
NORAD produced the first methodology for government Human Rights Impact Assessment with its 2001 Handbook in Human Rights Impact Assessment: State Obligations, Awareness & Empowerment. This handbook, as described by NORAD, "aims at providing the user with a practical tool for enhancing the human rights profile of development programmes". Implementation and testing has been limited, however, and it has been described as simplistic and preliminary.

The Thai Human Rights Commission conducted an ex ante impact assessment of the U.S.–Thailand Free Trade Agreement, in 2006. Although this was a welcome and bold initiative, it did not have a lasting impact due to successive changes in governments in Thailand. In addition, the HRIA has been criticized for being "methodologically weak".

Costa Rica's national human rights institution undertook an ex ante impact assessment of the intellectual property provisions of the Dominican Republic–Central America Free Trade Agreement in 2005. It was conducted without an explicit methodology and was labeled "considerations" rather than an impact assessment.

The Ecumenical Advocacy Alliance developed a methodology for right to food impact assessment of trade. It was tested on three case studies of rice-farming communities in Ghana, Honduras, and Indonesia.

The Humanist Committee on Human Rights (HOM) developed a human rights impact assessment approach to women's health, which is published in Health Rights of Women Assessment Instrument (2006). Like the Rights & Democracy methodology (described above), the HOM approach is designed for use by civil society. Civil society groups in Nepal and the Netherlands used the tool to develop policy recommendations for their respective governments.

The former UN Special Rapporteur on the Right to Health, Paul Hunt, in collaboration with Gillian MacNaughton of the Essex University Human Rights Center, produced a case study on the right to health in 2006, which included an analysis of the Norad, Rights & Democracy and HOM Health Rights of Women Assessment Instruments.

In 2017 the Economic Commission for Africa published a Human Rights Impact Assessment of the planned African CFTA (Continental Free Trade Agreement). This is particularly interesting for setting out a mandate for ongoing Monitoring and Evaluation, which gives life to the HRIA as an ongoing, iterative exercise.

The Swiss NGO Alliance Sud commissioned a proto-Human Rights Impact Assessment of a planned trade agreement with Mercosur. This sets out in detail the methodology, including qualitative and quantitative elements, that a governmental HRIA of a trade agreement should cover.
