= Police officer =

Warranted employee of a police force

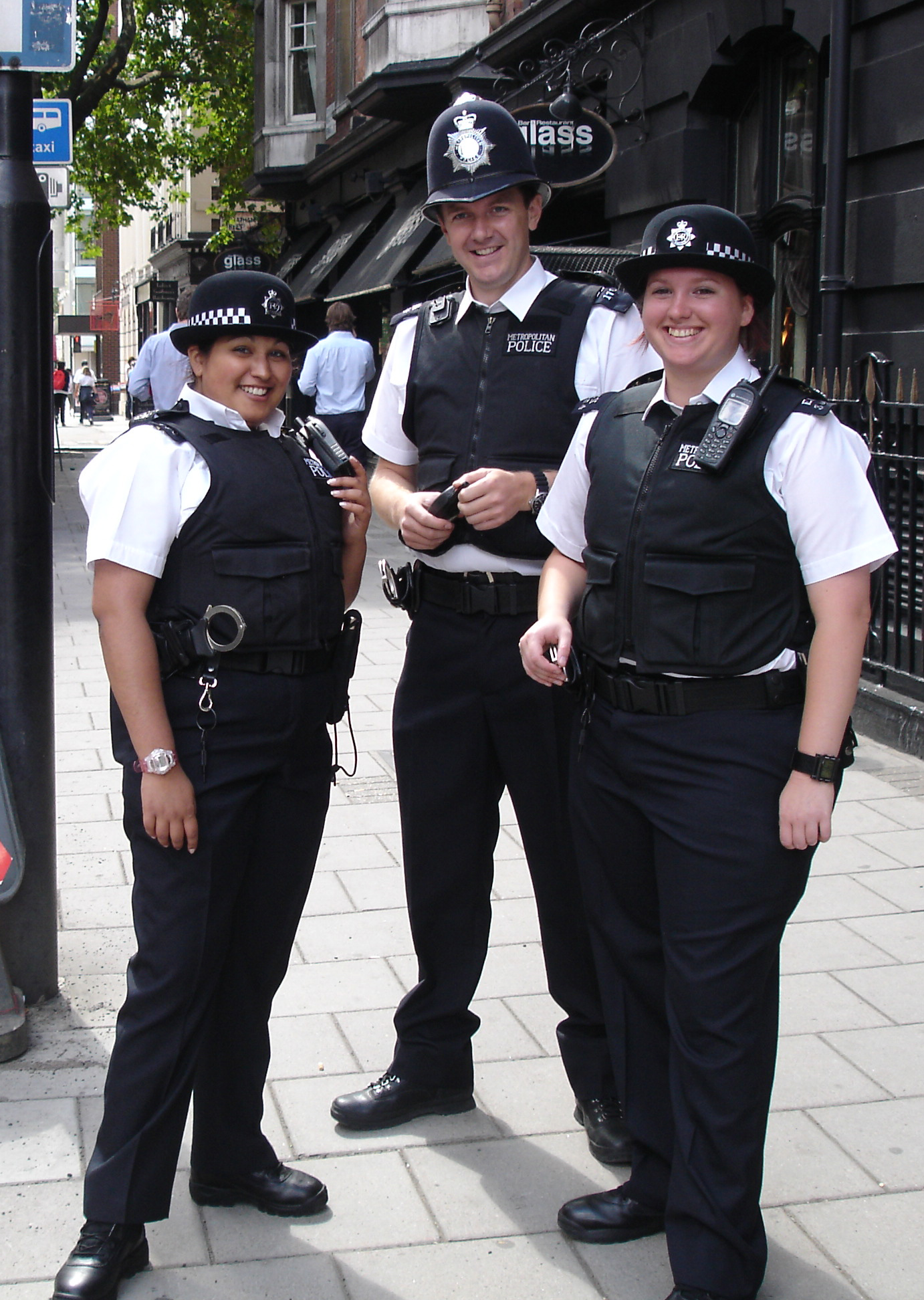
- Metropolitan Police officers in London

Occupation
- Synonyms: policeman (PL: policemen) policewoman (PL: policewomen)
- Activity sectors: Law enforcement public safety, civil service, public service, rescue, protection of private property

Description
- Education required: Secondary or tertiary education
- Fields of employment: Public areas
- Related jobs: gendarmerie, military police, security guard, bodyguard, detective, immigration officer

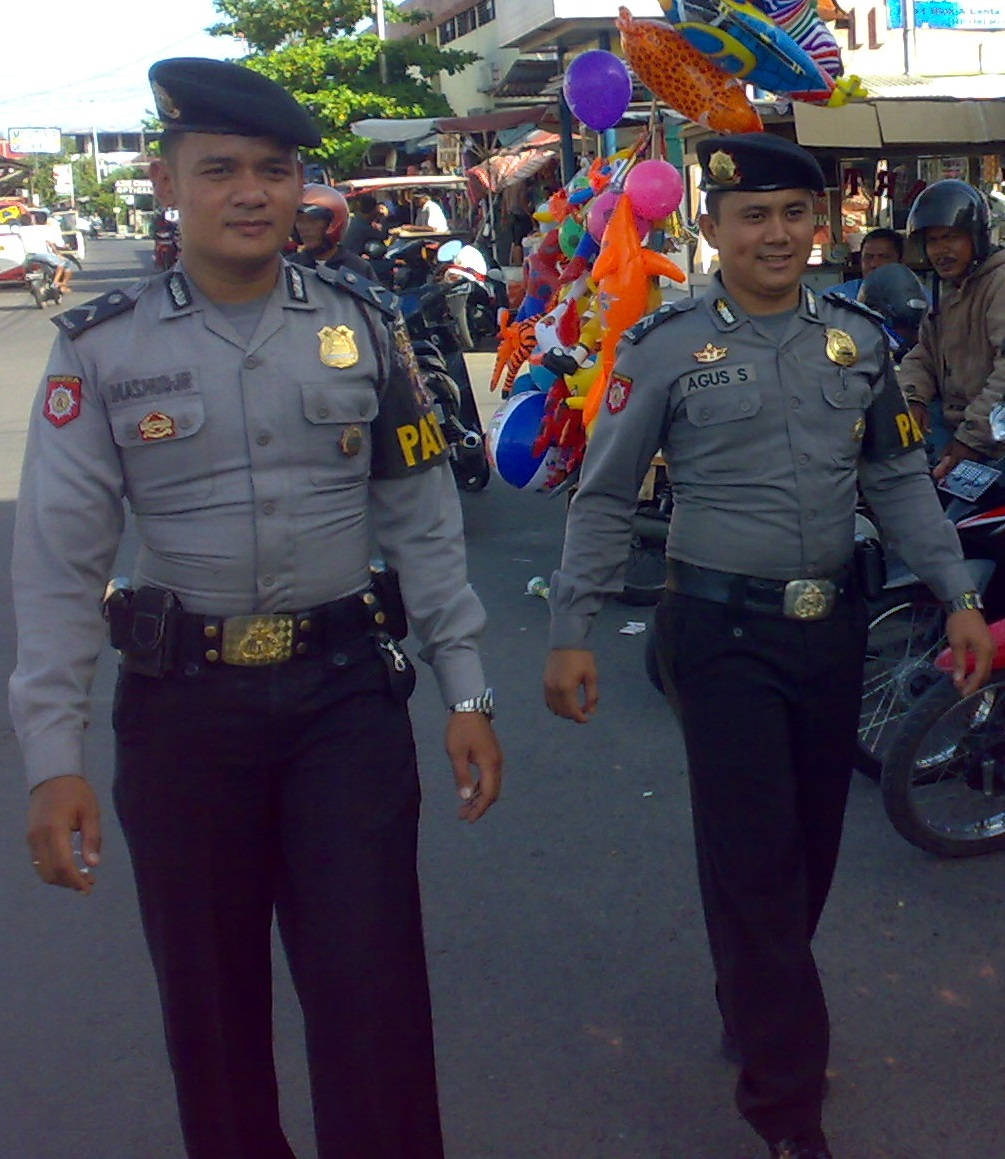
Policemen in Indonesia patrolling the streets in West Sumatra

A police officer (also called policeman or policewoman, cop, law enforcement officer, or in the UK copper) is a warranted law employee of a police force. In most countries, police officer is a generic term not specifying a particular rank. In some, the use of the rank officer is legally reserved for military personnel.

Police officers are generally charged with the apprehension of suspects and the prevention, detection, and reporting of crime, protection and assistance of the general public, and the maintenance of public order. Police officers may be sworn to an oath, and have the power to arrest people and detain them for a limited time, along with other duties and powers. Some officers are trained in special duties, such as counter-terrorism, surveillance, child protection, VIP protection, civil law enforcement, and investigation techniques into major crime including fraud, rape, murder, and drug trafficking. Although many police officers wear a corresponding uniform, some police officers are plain-clothed in order to pass themselves off as members of the public. In most countries police officers are given exemptions from certain laws to perform their duties. For example, an officer may use force if necessary to arrest or detain a person when it would ordinarily be assault. In some countries, officers can also violate traffic laws to perform their duties.

== Etymology ==
The word "police" comes from the Greek politeia, meaning government, which came to mean its civil administration. The more general term for the function is law enforcement officer or peace officer. A sheriff is typically the top police officer of a county, with that word coming from the person enforcing law over a shire. A person who has been deputized to serve the function of the sheriff is referred to as the deputy.

Police officers are those empowered by government to enforce the laws it creates. In The Federalist collection of articles and essays, James Madison wrote: "If men were angels, no Government would be necessary". These words apply to those who serve government, including police. A common nickname for a police officer is "cop"; derived from the verb sense "to arrest", itself derived from "to grab". Thus, "someone who captures", a "copper", was shortened to just "cop". It may also find its origin in the Latin capere, brought to English via the Old French caper.

== Duties and functions ==
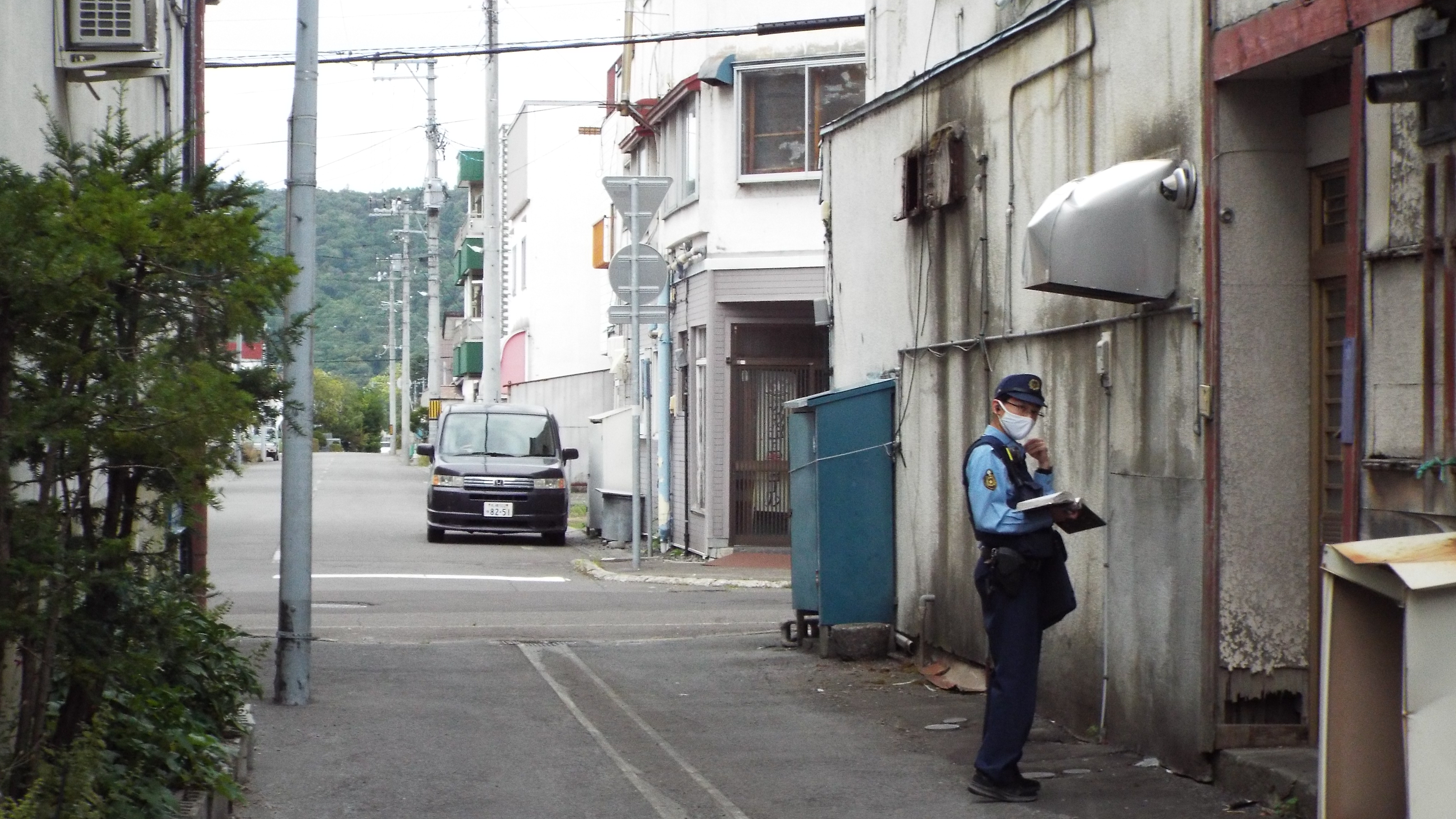
A Hokkaido Prefectural Police officer conducting a routine inspection in Ashibetsu.

The responsibilities of a police officer are varied, and may differ greatly from within one political context to another. Typical duties relate to keeping the peace, law enforcement, protection of people and property and the investigation of crimes. Officers are expected to respond to a variety of situations that may arise while they are on duty. Rules and guidelines dictate how an officer should behave within the community, and in many contexts, restrictions are placed on what the uniformed officer may wear. In some countries, rules and procedures dictate that a police officer is obliged to intervene in a criminal incident, even when off-duty. Police officers in nearly all countries retain their lawful powers while off duty.

In the majority of Western legal systems, the major role of the police is to maintain order, keeping the peace through surveillance of the public, and the subsequent reporting and apprehension of suspected violators of the law. They also function to discourage crimes through high-visibility policing, and most police forces have an investigative capability. Police have the legal authority to arrest and detain, usually granted by magistrates. Police officers also respond to calls for service, along with routine community policing.

Police are often used as an emergency service and may provide a public safety function at large gatherings, as well as in emergencies, disasters, search and rescue operations, and traffic collisions. To provide a prompt response in emergencies, the police often coordinate their operations with fire and emergency medical services. In some countries, individuals serve jointly as police officers as well as firefighters (creating the role of fire police). In many countries, there is a common emergency telephone number that allows the police, firefighters, or medical services to be summoned to an emergency. Some countries, such as the United Kingdom, have introduced command procedures for use in major emergencies or disorder. In the UK, The Gold Silver Bronze command structure is a system set up to improve communications between ground-based officers and the control room. Typically, a Bronze Commander would be a senior officer on the ground, coordinating the efforts in the center of the emergency, Silver Commanders would be positioned in an 'Incident Control Room' erected to improve better communications at the scene, and a Gold Commander would be in overall command in the Control Room.

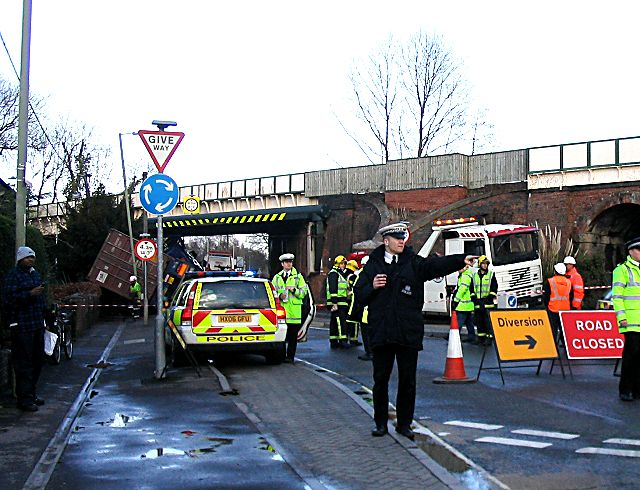
Hampshire and Isle of Wight Constabulary officers guarding the scene of a traffic collision involving a lorry and a bridge.

Police are also responsible for reprimanding minor offenders by issuing citations which typically may result in the imposition of fines, particularly for violations of traffic law. Traffic enforcement is often, but not always, accomplished by police officers on police motorcycles—called motor officers, these officers refer to the motorcycles they ride on duty as simply motors. Police are also trained to assist persons in distress, such as motorists whose cars have broken down and people experiencing a medical emergency. Police are typically trained in basic first aid such as CPR.

Some park rangers are commissioned as law enforcement officers and carry out a law-enforcement role within national parks and other back-country wilderness and recreational areas, whereas military police perform law enforcement functions within the military.

== Entry and promotion qualifications ==
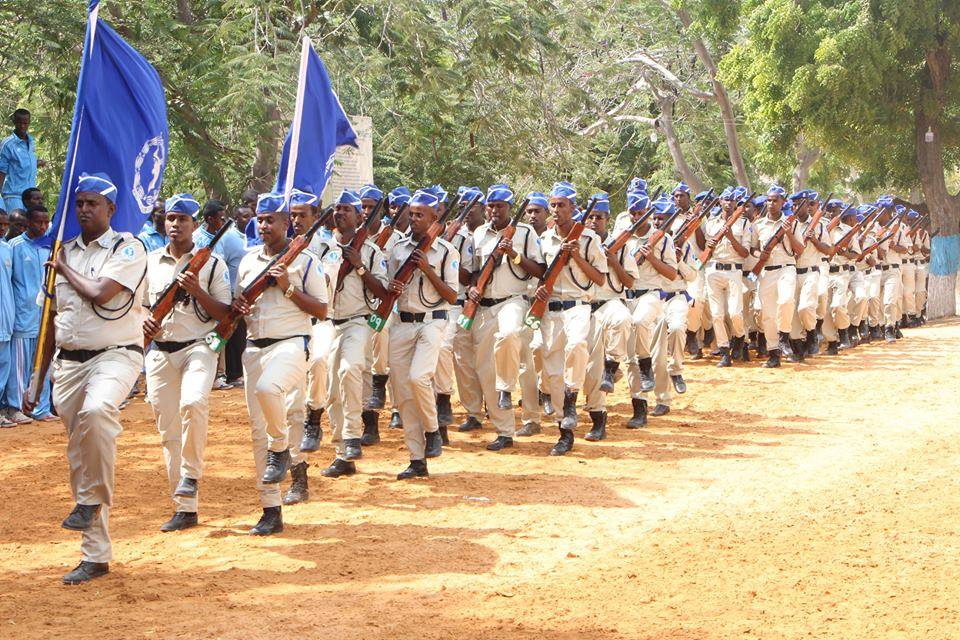
Somali Police Force cadets during a graduation ceremony at a police academy in Mogadishu.

In most countries, candidates for the police force must have completed some formal education. Increasing numbers of people joining the police possess tertiary education qualifications and in response to this, many police forces have developed a "fast-track" scheme whereby those with university degrees spend two to three years as a constable before receiving promotion to higher ranks, such as sergeants or inspectors. (Officers who work within investigative divisions or plainclothes are not necessarily of a higher rank but merely have different duties.) Police officers are also recruited from those with experience in the military or security services. In the United States, state laws may codify statewide qualification standards regarding age, education, criminal record, and training, but in other countries requirements are set by local police agencies. Generally, each police agency has different requirements. Promotion is not automatic and usually requires the candidate to pass some kind of examination, interview board or other selection procedure. Although promotion normally includes an increase in salary, it also brings with it an increase in responsibility and for most, an increase in administrative paperwork. There is no stigma in shunning promotion, as experienced line patrol officers are highly regarded.

Dependent upon each agency, but generally after completing two years of service, officers may apply for specialist positions, such as detective, police dog handler, mounted police officer, motorcycle officer, water police officer, or firearms officer (in countries where police are not routinely armed).

In some countries, including Singapore, police ranks are supplemented through conscription, similar to national service in the military. Qualifications may thus be relaxed or enhanced depending on the target mix of conscripts. Conscripts face tougher physical requirements in areas such as eyesight, but minimum academic qualification requirements are less stringent. Some join as volunteers, again via differing qualification requirements.

== Pay ==
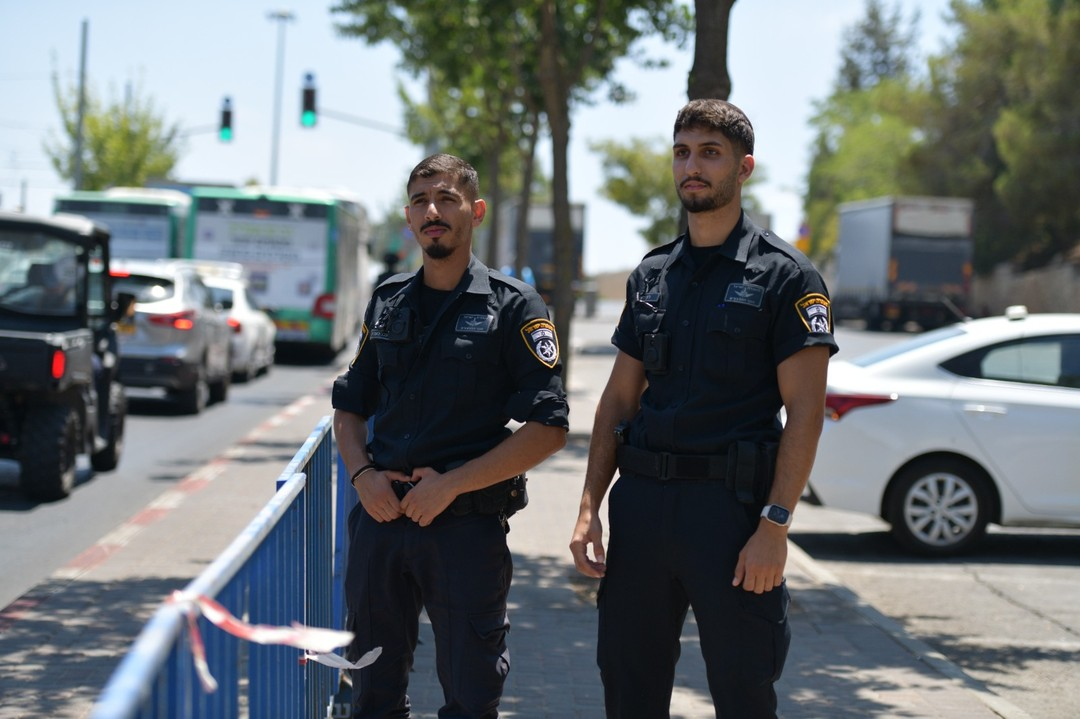
Israel Police officers in Jerusalem

In some societies, police officers are paid relatively well compared to other occupations; their pay depends on what rank they are within their police force and how many years they have served. In the United States, an average patrol officer's salary was $64,610 in 2021. In London, capital of the UK, a police officer's average basic salary in 2020 was £36,773 per annum. In the Netherlands, the average police officer working on the street is ranked in salary scale 6 to 9, €27,584 to €54,177 gross (€23,805 to €38,037 net) per year. Apart from these scales, there are higher functions which can increase an officer's salary. In 2026 the highest paying country was Switzerland with an average of CHF 93,976 per year. And the lowest being Nigeria, earning an average of ₦597926.82.

In some towns of Fairfield County, Connecticut, Police officers have earned $178,000-$312,000 with overtime. Similar pay rates have made reports for New Jersey and Oakland, California police officers. In 2023, a Senior Deputy with The San Francisco Sheriff's Office earned a top salary of double those in Connecticut.

== Occupational safety and health ==
There are numerous concerns affecting the safety and health of police officers, including occupational stress and death in the line of duty. Other concerns include high rates of depression, post-traumatic stress disorder, substance abuse, diabetes, and cardiac death. Traumatic stress can result from serious events such as line-of-duty shooting, personal attack, and hostage situation. On August 6, 2019, New Jersey Attorney General Gurbir Grewal announced the creation of the first U.S. state-wide program to support the mental health of police officers. The goal of the program is to train officers in emotional resiliency and to help destigmatize mental health problems. Agencies are creating approaches to incorporate health and wellness programs. The Fort Worth, Texas Police Department mandated, an alcohol awareness training program for all rank, which emphasized the severity of the issues, educated officers about the danger of alcohol and abuse, and fostered an environment where officers can see help when needed without shame. They also hired a mental health agency to provide a confidential, in-house peer support program. The Sacramento, California Police Department, reduced the total of on-duty injuries by hiring a professional that gives officers nutritional advice, provide customizable workout plans, and informs officers about exercise safey, healthy living, and creative ways to remain active.

== Application of force ==
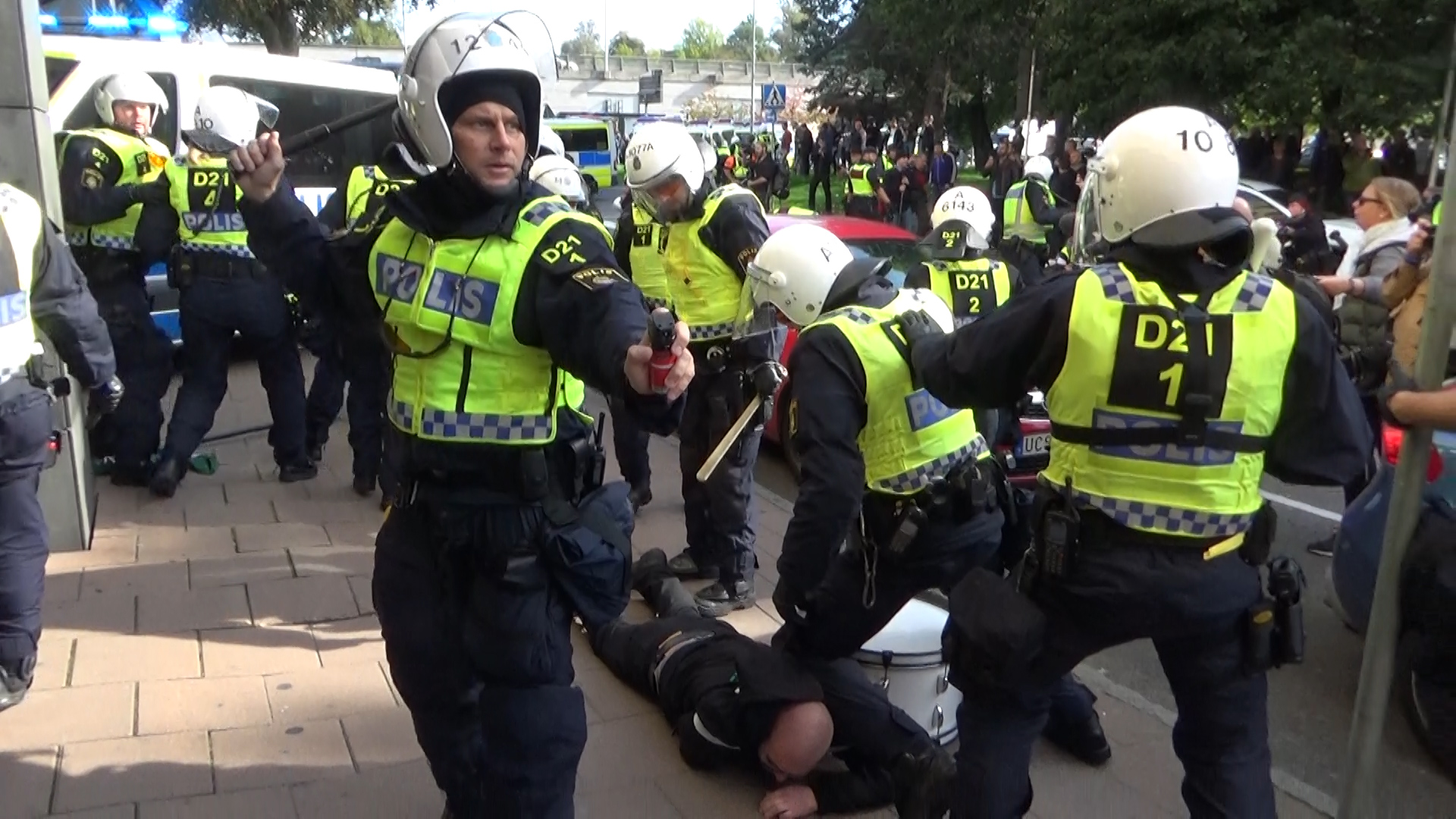
Swedish Police Authority officers arresting a member of the Nordic Resistance Movement during a neo-Nazi demonstration in Gothenburg.

=== Individual cases ===
Almost universally, police officers are authorized to use force, up to and including deadly force, when acting in a law enforcement capacity. Although most law enforcement agencies follow some variant of the use of force continuum, where officers are only authorized to use the level of force required to match situational requirements, specific thresholds and responses vary between jurisdictions. While officers are trained to avoid excessive use of force, and may be held legally accountable for infractions, the variability of law enforcement and its dependence on human judgment have made the subject an area of controversy and research.

=== Accountability ===
In the performance of their duties, police officers may act unlawfully, either deliberately or as a result of errors in judgment. Police accountability efforts strive to protect citizens and their rights by ensuring legal and effective law enforcement conduct, while affording individual officers the required autonomy, protection, and discretion. As an example, the use of body-worn cameras has been shown to reduce both instances of misconduct and complaints against officers.

== See also ==
- Chief of police
- Field training officer
- Internal affairs
- Military police
- Peace officer
- Police tactical unit
- Provost (military police)
- Wandering officer
- List of slang terms for police officers
