= Right to public participation =

Human right

The right to public participation is a human right enshrined by some international and national legal systems that protects public participation in certain decision making processes. Article 21 of the Universal Declaration of Human Rights states the right of every person to participate in the affairs of his country, either directly or by selecting representatives. Likewise, the right to political participation means the right under which the ruling authority is committed to providing rights to citizens, including the right to nominate and elect representatives, to hold public office in accordance with the principle of equal opportunities, to participate in private and public meetings, and the right to form and join political parties. Article 25 of the International Covenant on Civil and Political Rights makes a similar declaration about the right to participate in the management of public affairs and in periodic elections.

In some jurisdictions, the right to public participation is enshrined by law. The right to public participation may also be conceived of as human right, or as manifestation of the right to freedom of association and freedom of assembly. As such the Netherlands, Germany, Denmark and Sweden, have public participation and freedom of information provisions in their legal systems since before the Middle Ages. Democracy and public participation are closely connected democratic societies have incorporated public participation rights into their laws for centuries. For example, in the US the right to petition has been part of the First Amendment of the US constitution since 1791. More recently, since the 1970s in New Zealand numerous laws (e.g.: health, local government, environmental management) require government officials to "consult" those affected by a matter and take their views into consideration when making decisions.

Effective public participation depends on the public having accessing to accurate and comprehensive information. Hence laws regarding public participation often deal with the issue of the right to know, access of information and freedom of information. The right to participation may also be advanced in the context of equality and group rights, meant to ensure equal and full participation of a designated group in society. For example, in the context of disabled people.

== In specific domains ==
Several different sub-areas of human rights law include a heavier

=== Rio Declaration on Environment and Development ===
The Rio Declaration of 1992 enshrines public participation in its 27 principles. Principle 10 states that "environmental issues are best handled with participation of all concerned citizens, at the relevant level". The Rio Declaration continues, drawing a close link between access to information and public participation:

At the national level, each individual shall have appropriate access to information concerning the environment that is held by public authorities, including information on hazardous materials and activities in their communities, and the opportunity to participate in decision-making processes. States shall facilitate and encourage public awareness and participation by making information widely available. Effective access to judicial and administrative proceedings, including redress and remedy, shall be provided.

=== Convention on the Rights of Persons with Disabilities ===
The 2006 Convention on the Rights of Persons with Disabilities recognised that "disability results from the interaction between persons with impairments and attitudinal and environmental barriers that hinders their full and effective participation in society on an equal basis with others" and that "persons with disabilities continue to face barriers in their participation as equal members of society."

The Convention makes participation of disabled one of its principles, stating "The principles of the present Convention shall be:...Full and effective participation and inclusion in society;" subsequently enshrining the right of disabled to participate fully and equally in the community, education, all aspect of life (in the context of habilitation and rehabilitation), political and public life, cultural life, leisure, and sports.

== See also ==
- Civic virtue
- Good citizenship
- One man, one vote
- Public participation (general)
- Public participation (decision making)
