= Public participation =

Inclusion of the people in the activities of any organization or project

Public participation, also known as citizen participation or patient and public involvement, is the inclusion of the public in the activities of any organization or project. Public participation is similar to but more inclusive than stakeholder engagement.

Generally, public participation seeks to facilitate the involvement of those who are potentially affected by or interested in a decision. This can be in relation to individuals, governments, institutions, companies or any other entities that affect public interests. The principle of public participation holds that those who are affected by a decision have a right to be involved in the decision-making process. Public participation implies that public contributions can influence decision-making outcomes. Public participation may be regarded as a form of empowerment and as a vital part of democratic governance. In the context of knowledge management, the establishment of ongoing participatory processes is seen by some as the facilitator of collective intelligence and inclusiveness, shaped by the desire for the participation of the whole community or society.

Public participation is part of "people centred" or "human centric" principles, which have emerged in Western culture over the last thirty years, and has had some bearings of education, business, public policy and international relief and development programs. Public participation is advanced by the humanist movements. Public participation may be advanced as part of a "people first" paradigm shift. In this respect, public participation may challenge the concept that "big is better" and the logic of centralized hierarchies, advancing alternative concepts of "more heads are better than one" and arguing that public participation can sustain productive and durable change.

Some legal and other frameworks have developed a human rights approach to public participation. For example, the right to public participation in economic and human development was enshrined in the 1990 African Charter for Popular Participation in Development and Transformation. Similarly, major environmental and sustainability mechanisms have enshrined a right to public participation, such as the Rio Declaration.

== Right to public participation ==
The right to public participation is a human right enshrined by some international and national legal systems that protects public participation in certain decision making processes. Article 21 of the Universal Declaration of Human Rights states the right of every person to participate in the affairs of his country, either directly or by selecting representatives. Likewise, the right to political participation means the right under which the ruling authority is committed to providing rights to citizens, including the right to nominate and elect representatives, to hold public office in accordance with the principle of equal opportunities, to participate in private and public meetings, and the right to form and join political parties. Article 25 of the International Covenant on Civil and Political Rights makes a similar declaration about the right to participate in the management of public affairs and in periodic elections.

== Public trust ==
In recent years, loss of public trust in authorities and politicians has become a widespread concern in many democratic societies. The relationship between citizens and local governments has weakened over the past two decades due to shortcomings in public service delivery. Public participation is often discussed as one potential response to declining public trust and governance challenges, particularly in the UK, Europe, and other democracies. Establishing direct citizen participation can increase governance's effectiveness, legitimacy, and social justice. The idea is that public should be involved more fully in the policy process in that, authorities seek public views and participation, instead of treating the public as simply passive recipients of policy decisions.

The underlying assumption among political theorists, social commentators, and politicians is that public participation increases public trust in authorities, improving citizen political efficacy, enhancing democratic ideals and even improving the quality of policy decisions. However, the assumed benefits of public participation in restoring public trust are yet to be confirmed. Citizen participation is only sustained if citizens support it and if their involvement is actively supported by the governing body.

== Accountability ==
Public participation may also be viewed as accountability enhancing. The argument is that public participation can enable communities to hold public authorities accountable for implementation. In the United Kingdom citizens are used to ensure the fair and humane detention of prisoners. Volunteers comprise the Independent Monitoring Board that reports on the fair and humane detention of prisoners and detainees.

Many community organizations are composed of affluent middle-class citizens with the privilege and the time to participate. It is well documented that low-income citizens face difficulty organizing themselves and engaging in public issues. Obstacles like: finding affordable childcare, getting time off of work, and access to education in public matters exacerbate the lack of participation by low-income citizens. To foster greater participation of all social groups, vanguard privileged classes work to bring in low-income citizens through collaboration. The organizations establish an incentive for participation through accessible language and friendly environments. This allows for an atmosphere of consensus between middle and lower-income citizens.

== Efficacy ==
Why is the public motivated to participate in policy making in the first place? A study from Christopher M. Weible argues in his stakeholder example that individuals are motivated by their belief systems. More specifically, people are "motivated to convert their beliefs into policy" (Weible, 2007). Weible digresses his statements with a "three-tier hierarchical belief system" (Weible, 2007). The first tier is unchanging fundamental beliefs that a person holds. The middle tier is composed of core beliefs regarding policy and is more "pliable than deep core beliefs" (Weible, 2007), which is found in tier one. The final tier is merely secondary beliefs.

Christopher Weible’s study suggests that individuals may have an intrinsic motivation to participate in policy-making to some degree. That being said, how effective is public participation in the sphere of policy making? A study by Milena I. Neshkova and Hai Guo illuminates the effectiveness of public participation by using analyzing data from U.S. state transportation agencies. The way these authors measured this is by observing the "effect of public participation on organizational performance" (Neshkova and Guo, 2012). The organizational performance in this instance is U.S. state transportation agencies. The researchers concluded that "public participation is, in fact, associated with enhanced organizational performance" (Neshkova and Guo, 2012). Bureaucratic agencies in general become more effective when including the public in their decision making. What these two studies show is that the public has not only an interest in policy making, but is driven by their beliefs. Lastly, public participation is indeed an effective tool when lawmakers or bureaucratic agencies are making policies or laws.

Evaluating methods of public participation and involvement in across multiple disciplines and languages has been an ongoing challenge, making it difficult to assess effectiveness. Some novel tools for reporting involvement, engagement and participation across disciplines using standardised terminology have been developed. For example, a beta version of Standardised Data on Initiatives (STARDIT) was published in 2022, using Wikidata to encourage consistent terminology across languages to describe the tasks of involvement, the methods, communication modes and any impacts or outcomes from involvement. STARDIT has already been used by a number of organisations to report initiatives, including Cochrane, Australian Genomics 'Guidelines For Community Involvement In Genomics Research', NIHR funded research projects, La Trobe University's Academic and Research Collaborative in Health (ARCH), citizen science projects and the Wiki Journals.

However, participation is said by Huxley to be a possible method of capturing community activity into regimes of power and control although it has also been noted that capture and empowerment can co-exist.

== By field ==
=== Budgeting ===
Participatory budgeting is a process of democratic deliberation and decision-making, in which ordinary city residents decide how to allocate part of a municipal or public budget. Participatory budgeting is usually characterized by several basic design features: identification of spending priorities by community members, election of budget delegates to represent different communities, facilitation and technical assistance by public employees, local and higher level assemblies to deliberate and vote on spending priorities, and the implementation of local direct-impact community projects. Participatory budgeting may be used by towns and cities around the world, and has been widely publicised in Porto Alegre, Brazil, were the first full participatory budgeting process was developed starting in 1989.

=== Development ===
Video segment in 2011: "Without people participation development actions fail". - S.Kumar

In economic development theory, there is a school of participatory development. The desire to increase public participation in humanitarian aid and development has led to the establishment of a numerous context-specific, formal methodologies, matrices, pedagogies and ad hoc approaches. These include conscientization and praxis; Participatory action research (PAR), rapid rural appraisal (RRA) and participatory rural appraisal (PRA); appreciation influence control analysis (AIC); "open space" approaches; Objectives Oriented Project Planning (ZOPP); vulnerability analysis and capacity analysis.

=== Environment and sustainable development ===
In recent years, public participation has become seen as a vital part of addressing environmental problems and bringing about sustainable development. In this context are limits of solely relying on technocratic bureaucratic monopoly of decision making, and it is argued that public participation allows governments to adopt policies and enact laws that are relevant to communities and take into account their needs.

Public participation is recognised as an environmental principle, see Environmental Principles and Policies, and has been enshrined in the Rio Declaration. There have emerged a number of arguments in favor of a more participatory approach, which stress that public participation is a crucial element in environmental governance that contributes to better decision making. It is recognised that environmental problems cannot be solved by government alone. Participation in environmental decision-making can link the public more directly to environmental governance. By involving the public, who are at the root of both causes and solutions of environmental problems, in environmental discussions, transparency and accountability are more likely to be achieved, thus securing the democratic legitimacy of decision-making that good environmental governance depends on. Arguably, a strong public participation in environmental governance could increase the commitment among stockholders, which strengthens the compliance and enforcement of environmental laws. GIS can provide a valuable tool for such work (see GIS and environmental governance). In addition, some opponents argue that the right to participate in environmental decision-making is a procedural right that "can be seen as part of the fundamental right to environmental protection". From this ethical perspective, environmental governance is expected to operate within a framework coinciding the "constitutional principle of fairness (inclusive of equality)", which inevitably requires the fulfillment of "environmental rights" and ultimately calls for the engagement of public. Further, in the context of considerable scientific uncertainties surrounding environmental issues, public participation helps to counter such uncertainties and bridges the gap between scientifically defined environmental problems and the experiences and values of stakeholders. Through joint effort of the government and scientists in collaboration with the public, better governance of environment is expected to be achieved by making the most appropriate decision possible.

Although broad agreements exist, the notion of public participation in environmental decision-making has been subject to a sustained critique concerning the real outcome of participatory environmental governance. Critics argue that public participation tends to focus on reaching a consensus between actors who share the same values and seek the same outcomes. However, the uncertain nature of many of the environmental issues would undermine the validity of public participation, given that in many cases the actors come to the table of discussion hold very different perceptions of the problem and solution which are unlikely to be welded into a consensus due to the incommensurability of different positions. This may run the risk of expert bias, which generates further exclusion as those who are antagonistic to the consensus would be marginalised in the environmental decision-making process, which violates the assumed advantage of participatory approach to produce democratic environmental decisions. This raises the further question of whether consensus should be the measure of a successful outcome of participation. As Davies suggests, participative democracy could not guarantee the substantive environmental benefits 'if there are competing views of what the environment should be like and what it is valuable for'. Consequently, who should be involved at what points in the process of environmental decision-making and what is the goal of this kind of participation become central to the debates on public participation as a key issue in environmental governance.

=== Heritage ===
Around the globe, experts work closely with local communities. Local communities are crucial stakeholders for heritage.

Consultation with local communities is acknowledged formally in cultural management processes. They are necessary for defining the significance of a cultural place/site, otherwise you run the risk of overseeing many values, focusing on "experts'" views. This has been the case in heritage management until the end of the 20th century. A paradigm shift started with the Burra Charter by ICOMOS Australia in 1979 and was later developed by the work of the GCI around 2000. Today, so called "value-led conservation" is at the base of heritage management for WH sites: establishing stakeholders and associated values is a fundamental step in creating a Management Plan for such sites.

The concept of stakeholders has widened to include local communities.

Various levels of local government, research institutions, enterprises, charitable organisations, and communities are all important parties. Activities such as knowledge exchange, education, consultation, exhibitions, academic events, publicity campaigns, among others are all effective means for local participation.

For instance, local charities in Homs, Syria have been undertaking several projects with local communities to protect their heritage.

A conservation programme in Dangeil, Sudan, has used social and economic relationship with the community to make the project sustainable over the long term.

In Australia, Indigenous communities increasingly have stewardship of conservation and management programs to care for, monitor and maintain their cultural heritage places and landscapes, particularly those containing rock art.

=== Public policy ===
In some countries public participation has become a central principle of public policy making within democratic bodies, policies are rendered legitimate when citizens have the opportunity to influence the politicians and parties involved. In the UK and Canada it has been observed that all levels of government have started to build citizen and stakeholder engagement into their policy-making processes. Situating citizens as active actors in policy-making can work to offset government failures by allowing for reform that will better emulate the needs of citizens. By incorporating citizens, policies will reflect everyday needs and realities, and not the machinations of politicians and political parties. This may involve large-scale consultations, focus group research, online discussion forums, or deliberative citizens' juries. There are many different public participation mechanisms, although these often share common features (for a list over 100, and a typology of mechanisms, see Rowe and Frewer, 2005).

Public participation is viewed as a tool, intended to inform planning, organising or funding of activities. Public participation may also be used to measure attainable objectives, evaluate impact, and identify lessons for future practice. In Brazil's housing councils, mandated in 2005, citizen engagement in policy drafting increased effectiveness and responsiveness of government public service delivery. All modern constitutions and fundamental laws contain and declare the concept and principle of popular sovereignty, which essentially means that the people are the ultimate source of public power or government authority. The concept of popular sovereignty holds simply that in a society organized for political action, the will of the people as a whole is the only right standard of political action. It can be regarded as an important element in the system of the checks and balances, and representative democracy. Therefore, the people are implicitly entitled even to directly participate in the process of public policy and law making.

In the United States, public participation in administrative rulemaking refers to the process by which proposed rules are subject to public comment for a specified period of time. Public participation is typically mandatory for rules promulgated by executive agencies of the US government. Statutes or agency policies may mandate public hearings during this period.

=== Science ===
Citizen science is a coined term commonly used to describe the participation of non-scientists in scientific research. Greater inclusion of non-professional scientists in policy research and "democratization of policy research" can be important. Several benefits are claimed: having citizens involved in not just the contribution of data, but also the framing and development of research itself. The key to success in applying citizen science to policy development is data which is "suitable, robust, and of a known quality for evidence-based policy making". Barriers to applying citizen science to policy development include a lack of suitability between the data collected and the policy in question and skepticism regarding the data collected by non-experts.

== See also ==
- Citizens' assembly
- Citizen science
- Deliberative democracy
- Localisation (humanitarian practice)
- Neighborhood planning
- Opinion poll
- Participation (decision making)
- Participatory economics
- Participatory culture
- Participatory justice
- Progress in Community Health Partnerships
- Political egalitarianism
- Radical transparency
- Strategic lawsuit against public participation
- Visual preference survey
