= Public order =

Public order may refer to

- Public security: the prevention of and protection from events that could endanger the safety and security of the public from significant danger or property damage
- Public order policing: police maintenance of order during protests
- Crowd control: maintenance of order during sporting events, concerts or other large events
- Public order crime: crime which involves acts that interfere with the operations of society and the ability of people to function efficiently
