= Governance Center for Public Policies =

Iraq-based think tank

Governance Center for Public Policies مركز حوكمة للسياسات العامة
- مركز حوكمة للسياسات العامة
- Founded at: Iraq
- Type: NGO; Nonprofit organization
- Headquarters: Baghdad, Iraq
- Region served: Global
- Official language: Arabic; English; Urdu
- Website: http://www.iqgcpp.org/

Governance Center for Public Policies (GCPP) (Arabic: مركز حوكمة للسياسات العامة; ) is an Iraqi non-governmental organization founded in 2010. Governance research institution are one of the centers of thinking and quality research work (Think Tank). It seeks to effectively contribute in supporting the sustainable development orientations by assisting the governance efforts through management and office management.

It also contributes in creating social awareness towards the strategic issues in Iraq and works with its stakeholders to achieve a developmental environment based on civil rights, freedom, democracy, and sovereignty by strengthening the role of the private sectors, supporting the issues of women and disadvantaged groups.

Moreover, the NGO realized the requirements of social peace and the rule of law, thereby supporting good institutional management through building bridges between those who have creative ideas and the ones in need for them, i.e fostering the positive development of the two parties involved.

== Projects ==
The Governance Center for Public policies works in partnership with the national fundporting democracy (NED group) to do workshops and national conferences about seven national issues like:

1. National Reconciliation – the center held a number of workshops for this topic in (Baghdad, Babil, Dhi Qar Governorate and Basrah) in addition to a regional conference in Baghdad.

2. The Governance center within its partnership program with (NED) has numerous workshops in Baghdad and in other provinces about several issues like: electoral systems, parties law, economic policies, corruption and educational policies.

a. Governance center held a conference about the reform of the agricultural sector and livestock in Iraq in collaboration with the provincial Council.

b. Governance center participated within its partnership program with Shahrazad Campaign held by the Iraqi women journalists forum about the protection and safety of women journalists and defenders of Human Rights.

c. Governance Center took part in preparing and drafting the strategy of national reconciliation with the Prime Minister's office in collaboration with a Finnish Organization (CMI).

d. Governance Center participated in Iraqi’s Forum for Intellectuals & Academics Conference held in Istanbul about women issues.

e. The Governance center within its partnership program with Konrad-Adenauer-Stiftung (KAS) had many workshops in Baghdad, Anbar, Najaf and Babylon by supporting UN’S SDG16 through improved accountability and governance.

f. The Governance center within its partnership program with Institute on Governance (IG) had workshop in Karbala about monitoring the implementation of the general budget in Iraq.
