= African Charter for Popular Participation in Development and Transformation =

The African Charter for Popular Participation in Development and Transformation was adopted in February 1990 at the "International Conference on Popular Participation in the Recovery and Development Process in Africa", Arusha, Tanzania.

The Charter was officially adopted at the Twenty-fifth session of the Economic Commission for Africa and Sixteenth meeting of the Economic Commission for Africa Conference of Ministers responsible for Economic Planning and Development.

The Charter was adopted in the context of a deterioration of social and economic conditions in African countries in the 1980s and ratifying parties thought that the lack of "full appreciation of the role popular participation (see public participation plays in the process of recovery and development" was partly to blame.

The Charter was initiated by NGOs, grass-roots organisations and African Governments. The Charter emerged NGO suggestions the 1988 mid-term review of the United Nations Programme of Action for African Economic Recovery and Development, 1986-1990 (UN-PAAERD), which established a framework co-operation between Africa and the international community.

The then UN Secretary-General, Javier Pérez de Cuéllar stated, in a message to the "International Conference on Popular Participation in the Recovery and Development Process in Africa" that "The continent needs to enter the 1990s with a clean slate, economically speaking, if it is to grasp the opportunities offered by the profound changes of the 1980s", calling for diversification of African national economies, the creation of larger markets, investment in social and economic infrastructure, "and the page needs to be turned on its external indebtedness". Cuellar underlined that in the long run, the recovery and development must be determined by Africa itself and by "the vibrant cultures of its peoples".

== See also ==
- African Charter on Human and Peoples' Rights
- Right to development
