= Visual preference survey =

A visual preference survey is a technique for obtaining public feedback on physical design alternatives. It is often used when designing zoning codes, planning redevelopment, and conducting urban planning research.

The survey consists of a series of images that participants must score according to their preference. The images may be actual photographs or computer-simulated images depicting potential urban environments. The participants' input is then used to make decisions about the future built environment.

This technique was developed by urban planner Anton "Tony" Nelessen in the late 1970s, and it grew in popularity during the 1990s. The method has been criticized on the basis that lighting, weather, and background activities might influence preferences. In part this is corrected by using simulated imagery, but simulations themselves may be misleading when compared with actual photographs. Recent plans utilizing visual preference surveys include Denver, Topeka, New Castle, and Orlando.

There are also international policy reforms and movements seeking to include visual preference surveys in various planning systems. The United Kingdom has included visual preference surveys as a preferred engagement tool under the National Model Design Code. Street Level Australia, specifically Benjamin Frasco, Sean Perry, and Milly Main, have advocated for their use in the development of Pattern Books in New South Wales, Australia. Frasco was also the lead author of an article in the UDIA's Urban Icon Issue #3 (December 2024), further advocating for visual preference surveys in the NSW Pattern Book.

== Criticisms of Visual Preference Surveys ==
Visual Preference Surveys have been criticized for potentially eliciting inaccurate measurements of a communities preference. As planner Reid Ewing has noted, “when you show citizens stark images of new suburban subdivisions or strip centers versus beautified images from America’s finest small towns, the outcome is predictable and largely meaningless.”

For accurate results, a visual preference survey must adhere to sound research design: It must be specifically tailored to the community and location, generated after multiple discussions and field investigations and photographic reconnaissance, and address eight or more related categories of visual and spatial characteristics.

Effective visual preference surveys are precise in exploring which variables they are attempting to measure, whether it be street trees, bike lanes, crosswalks, or any number of proposed changes. Nelessen and other practitioners have addressed this issue through the use of simulated or manipulated imagery using Adobe Photoshop or any number image manipulation software. In practice, this may involve taking exactly the same picture, yet adding a single element to the second picture to gauge community reaction to a proposed change. For example, visual preference surveys for locations such as Topeka, Princeton, and Journal Square contain several such images - one untouched image contrasted with exactly the same picture except with a single new element added, such as pedestrians, a narrower street, a median with greenery or other design elements. In such instances, higher scores for the second, doctored image provide a more reliable gauge for the aesthetic preferences of a community.

== See also ==
- Environmental psychology
