= Marlin Mine =

Gold mine in Guatemala

The Marlin Mine is a gold mine in Guatemala owned by Montana Exploradora de Guatemala, Montana, which is a subsidiary of Canadian company Goldcorp.

== Location and description ==
The Marlin gold mine site is located at 15.234852°N 91.689418°W and spans the boundary of two municipalities in Guatemala – San Miguel Ixtahuacán (San Miguel) and Sipacapa, both within the San Marcos Department – which is 300 kilometers (186 miles) by paved and gravel road from Guatemala City. The elevation of the site ranges from 1,800 to 2,300 (1.12 to 1.43 mi) meters above sea level.

The ore body and approximately 87% of the mine property are in the municipality of San Miguel.

== Exploration and mining history ==
The Marlin deposit was discovered through regional exploration in 1998 by Montana Exploradora, S.A. and was later purchased by Francisco Gold Corporation in 2000. In 2002, Francisco merged into Glamis Gold and the mine was brought into production in 2005 by Glamis. The following year, Glamis was acquired by Goldcorp.

== Operations and economic impact ==
Marlin has both open-pit and underground mining operations, with identified reserves to support production until 2017 and adjacent discoveries are expected to allow longer term operation. The ore is first crushed and then milled, then cyanide leached in tanks. The gold and silver bearing solution is then processed in a refinery on-site and then smelted to produce doré bars.

Over 50 percent of the 1,900 people working at the mine were local residents at their time of hiring, and 98 percent were Guatemalan residents. In 2008, the Marlin operation spent more than $90 million in Guatemala on supplies and services, and paid over $20 million in taxes. Marlin’s 2011 profits were $607 million. Of that, only one-half of one percent went to the Guatemalan government.

== Environmental management and social impact ==
=== Environmental and monitoring management activities ===
The Marlin environmental monitoring program describes air quality, ambient noise, aquatic biology, surface water quality, and ground water quality. As of the spring of 2010 the company which owns Marlin mine claims that it has not discharged any water to the local rivers or water sources. This is in direct contradiction with reports from local indigenous people. The Maya people report the poisoning of their water sources, livestock dying after drinking well water, and the destruction of their ancestral land. The company reports that water from the operations is treated and contained in a tailings pond designed to international standards and 89% is recycled in the operation. Water quality in local streams and groundwater is regularly monitored by Goldcorp, an independent Community Environmental Monitoring Association (AMAC), and two separate Guatemalan government ministries. As of the spring of 2010, no negative water samples had been found. Of course, this is also in direct contradiction with on-site footage of the waters and the reports of the people who live in the area.

=== Third-party environmental and health impact studies ===
In May 2010, the organization Physicians for Human Rights (PHR) released a study carried out with the University of Michigan on metals levels of blood and urine in a self-selected sample of 18 area residents and 5 Marlin mine workers; as well sampling four river locations and five drinking water sources. The study was carried out independent of the company, under an initiative of the Archbishop of Guatemala, Cardinal Rodolfo Quezada Toruño. The study, characterizing its findings as “qualitative, preliminary and descriptive”, reported that, on average, individuals residing closest to the mine had higher levels of certain metals when compared to those living further away. The study emphasized that,

given that the Marlin mine is a relatively new operation, the negative impacts of the mine on human health and ecosystem quality in the region have the potential to increase in the coming years and last for decades, as commonly occur near other mining facilities worldwide.

The study found levels of some other metals were elevated in comparison to established normal ranges in many individuals, but without any apparent relationship to proximity to the mine or occupation.

The PHR study also found that “none of the levels in the samples exceed those considered acceptable by the U.S. Centers for Disease Control and Prevention and by widely recognized scientific standards”. The study also found no correlation between any metal levels and occupation, no correlations between metal levels and reported health, and no correlation between reported health and proximity to the mine. The PHR study also reported that several metals (aluminum, manganese and cobalt) were found at higher levels in the river water and sediment sites directly below the mine when compared to sites elsewhere – these were not the metals showing higher levels in the residents closer to the mine. In the river water samples, all metals were within "US benchmarks" with the exception of aluminum levels in one sample.

The authors recommended a more comprehensive study of the area human health and ecology. The authors did not refer to the baseline study data which showed river water to have naturally high metals levels prior to the existence of the mining operation. However, data from said baseline study appears to contradict Montana Exploradora's own Environmental and Social Impact Study, that claimed both the Tzalá and Quichivil rivers prior to the mining operations were "proper for aquatic life and apparently free of toxicity".

All drinking water sampled in the PHR study had metals content below limits set in the US EPA’s National Drinking Water Regulations (the highest arsenic level was found in the commercial bottled water sample). Soil sample metals levels were also "within background ranges", and river sediment samples all showed metals contents "lower than US regulatory benchmark values".

=== Social impact and community relations ===
A year prior to the Goldcorp takeover, residents of Sipacapa filed a complaint against Glamis with the Office of the Compliance Advisor/Ombudsman (CAO) of the World Bank Group, alleging that the Marlin mine was "developed without adequate consultation and in violation of the rights of indigenous people". The CAO found that Glamis had "interacted extensively" with local communities. However, it also found that "public disclosures prepared by the company – including the ESIA (environmental and social impact assessment) – were highly technical and did not at the time have sufficient information to allow for an informed view of the likely adverse impacts of the project". The report also stated "As a result of an aggressive and at times factually unfounded campaign focused against the project, some people – predominantly in Sipacapa – believe that these risks have not been adequately monitored, managed or mitigated." The report notes that the campaign against the project raised considerable fear and apprehension amongst local people about the possible negative impacts of mining, has contributed to local tensions, and has not always been a reasonable source of information for local people. The report concluded that environmental risks were adequately managed, and recommended enhanced participation by local people in "forward-looking decisions related to future exploration, royalties, and distribution of benefits", and that a "high level" delegation from the mine and a group of people representing the complainants and people of Sipacapa "should consider engaging in dialogue to establish acceptable next steps towards achieving resolution of this dispute".

Similar to the 2005 CAO's report, the 2010 PHR study noted that “it was clear during our visit that many area residents suffer from psychosocial stress and that much distrust and miscommunication exists amongst and between the various stakeholders – area residents, non-governmental organizations, representatives of the Marlin mine, government officials.” Rather than resulting from miscommunication local residents may be experiencing "stress" as a result of a company hired paramilitary group shooting a local woman in the head because she refused to sell her land to the company. Or the other woman whose brother was burned to death in front of her because she refused to sell her land to the mine. Or it may simply be because day-and-night explosions shake the foundations of their homes, leaving huge cracks in the walls.

One source of controversy and much of the basis for claims of lack of adherence to indigenous rights stems from the results of a 2005 referendum in which approximately 98% of 2,500 participants (out of 14,000 residents, although reported as representing 44.3% of the voting population) in the Sipacapa municipality voted to reject mining in the area (no referendum has been held in San Miguel). The referendum in Sipacapa was preceded by 13 "community consultations", in which 11 communities signed acts stating their position against mining, and one community signed an act in support of mining (one other abstained from taking a position). Although the Sipacapa municipal government initially supported the idea of the consultations, it withdrew its support during the process. The time period leading up to the referendum was characterized in the CAO report as marked by confusing, contradictory and often inaccurate information on the impacts of mining, as well as reports of voter intimidation. The validity of the referendum was challenged in court, and in 2007, the Guatemalan court found that the "consulta" was legal as a "mechanism of expression for the populace", but was not binding in Guatemalan law.

In 2009, the company sponsored an independent Human Rights Impact Assessment of the Marlin Mine. This assessment was carried out by On Common Ground Consultants Inc., under the oversight of a steering committee composed of a representative of a socially responsible shareholders group, a representative from Guatemala, and a company representative. Goldcorp has made the report, released on May 17, 2010, publicly available via the web-site set-up for the assessment www.hria-guatemala.com. The report notes that many locally active NGO's opposed the study.

=== External calls for suspension or closure of the mine ===
In February 2010, the Committee of Experts of the International Labour Organization (ILO) of the United Nations also called for the suspension of the Marlin Mine. "The Committee requests the Government to neither grant nor renew any licence for the exploration and exploitation of natural resources as referred to in Article 15 of the Convention while the participation and consultation provided for by the Convention are not being carried out, and to provide information in this regard". The confusion over the environmental situation, and the use of suppositions of environmental harm being used to bolster the case for closure of the mine are evident in the ILO report. The ILO stated that in part its decision was based the issue of potential environmental hazards raised in the 2005 CAO report but made no mention of the fact that the CAO report found that all hazards were adequately managed. The ILO also cited a statement in the CAO report that cyanide leaching, used by Marlin, had been banned in several jurisdictions – however, this is not actually stated in the CAO report.

On May 20, 2010, the Inter-American Commission on Human Rights, an independent body of the Organization of American States (OAS), granted "precautionary measures" for the members of 18 Maya indigenous communities surrounding the Marlin Mine. The commission has the authority to grant precautionary measures in situations where it is persuaded that urgent action is necessary while it considers a pending case – but,

the granting of such measures and their adoption by the State shall not constitute a prejudgment on the violation.

In its ruling, the commission called on the government of Guatemala to suspend operation of the mine and “other activities related to the concession granted to the company".

The basis of precautionary measures is the petitioners' claim that a number of water wells and springs have dried up in the area of the mine, and that metals present in the water as a result of the mining activity have had harmful effects on the health of members of the community. This is all despite the May 2010 PHR report finding that all drinking water samples were within US EPA standards, and all river samples were within "US Benchmarks" with the exception of elevated aluminum in one sample.

On June 23, 2010, the Guatemalan government announced that it would initiate the administrative process to suspend operations at the Marlin mine. The government is assuring residents that there is no evidence that the community water supplies are contaminated and that they are fit for human consumption. The government also stated that an assessment by the Ministry of Health and Social Welfare did not detect any disease linked to suspected contamination produced by the Marlin Mine. An IACHR delegation was scheduled to visit the site in mid-July 2010.

Nobel Peace Prize winner Rigoberta Menchú called on the government of Guatemala to follow the ruling by IACHR, saying that president Alvaro Colom should not "judge the situation", but should simply act on the IACHR ruling.

In December 2011, IACHR announced that based on information presented by the state and the petitioners, it was revising the precautionary measure to no longer call for the closure of the mine. The revised precautionary measure requests that the State ensure that the 18 communities have access to potable water than can be used for human consumption. This is consistent with evidence that there are some elevated metals levels in local water supplies but that these levels are naturally occurring and existed before the construction of the mine.
