= United Nations Guiding Principles on Business and Human Rights =

Framework for how businesses should respect human rights

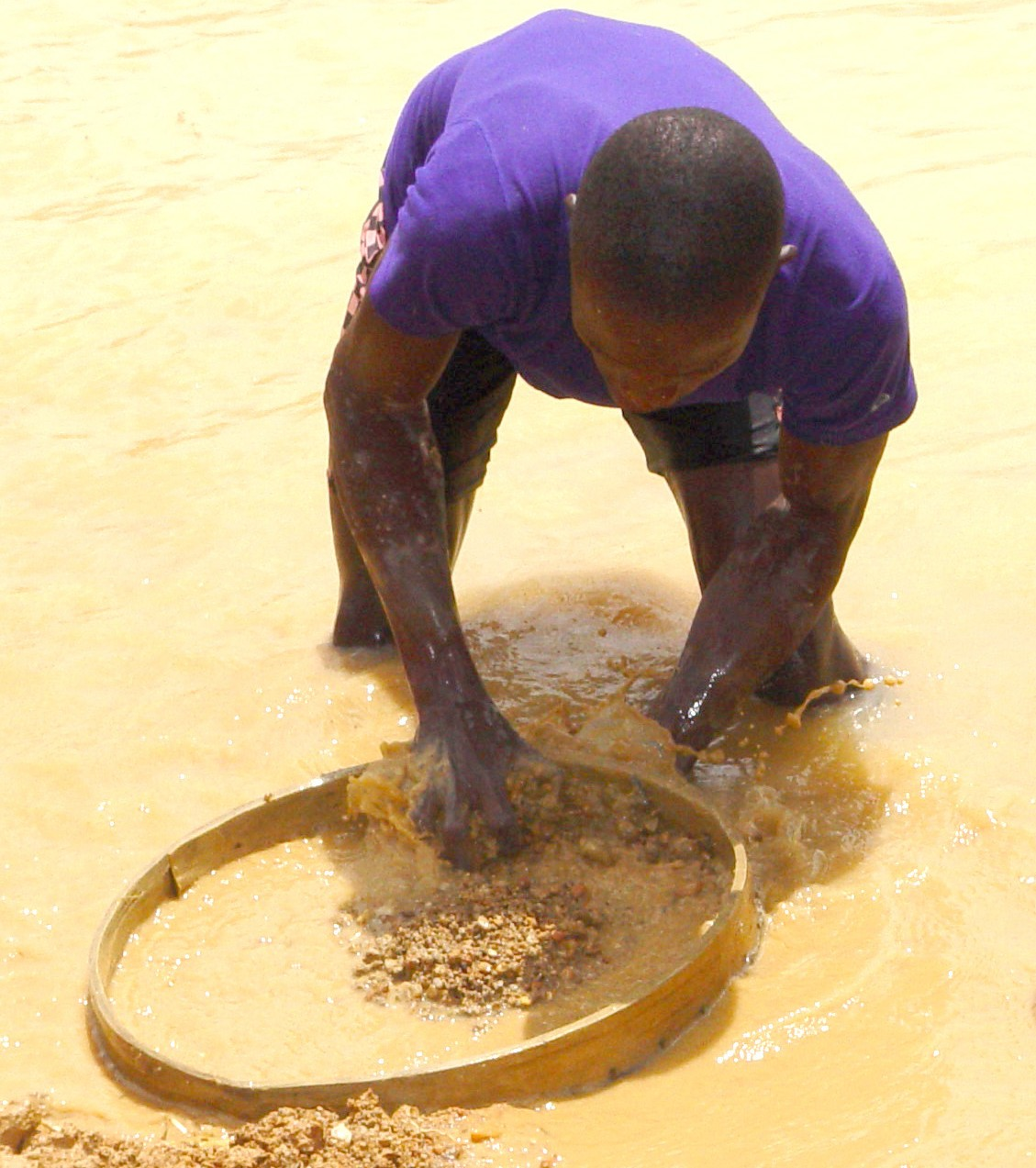
Miner from Sierra Leone's Kono district has benefited from the Office of Conflict Management and Mitigation's (CMM) toolkits, like those from Sierra Leone's Peace Diamond Alliance. The alliance improved distribution of benefits from the diamond mining industry and restricted access to markets for people selling illegal "conflict diamonds" to fuel ongoing instability.

The United Nations Guiding Principles on Business and Human Rights (UNGPs) is an instrument consisting of 31 principles implementing the United Nations (UN) Protect, Respect and Remedy framework on the issue of human rights and transnational corporations and other business enterprises. Developed by the Special Representative of the Secretary-General (SRSG) John Ruggie, the Guiding Principles provided the first global standard for preventing and addressing the risk of adverse impacts on human rights linked to business activity, and they continue to provide the internationally accepted framework for enhancing standards and practices regarding business and human rights. On June 16, 2011, the United Nations Human Rights Council unanimously endorsed the Guiding Principles for Business and Human Rights, making the framework the first corporate human rights responsibility initiative to be endorsed by the UN.

The UNGPs encompass three pillars outlining how states and businesses should implement the framework:

- The state duty to protect human rights
- The corporate responsibility to respect human rights
- Access to remedy for victims of business-related abuses

The UNGPs have received wide support from states, civil society organizations, and even the private sector, this has further solidified their status as the key global foundation for business and human rights. The UNGP are informally known as the "Ruggie Principles" or the "Ruggie Framework" due to their authorship by Ruggie, who conceived them and led the process for their consultation and implementation.

== History ==
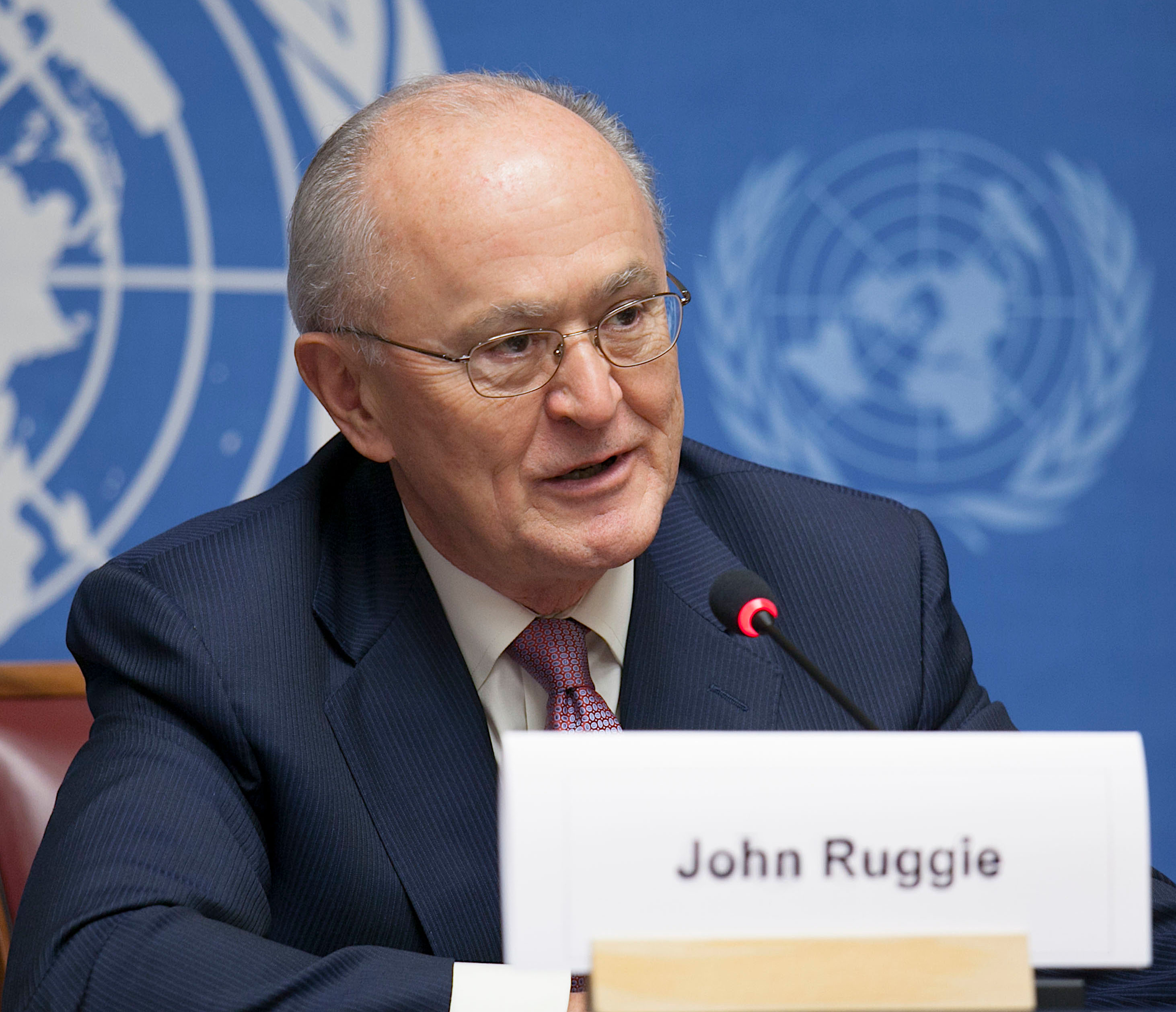
John Ruggie, Special Representative of the UN Secretary General and author of the UN Guiding Principles on Business and Human Rights.

The UNGPs came as a result of several decades of UN efforts to create global human rights standards for businesses. In the early 1970s, the United Nations Economic and Social Council requested that the Secretary General create a commission group to study the impact of transnational corporations (TNCs) on development processes and international relations. The UN created the Commission on Transnational Corporations in 1973, with the goal of formulating a corporate code of conduct for TNCs. The Commission's work continued into the early 1990s, but the group was ultimately unable to ratify an agreeable code due to various disagreements between developed and developing countries. The group was dissolved in 1994. The debate concerning the responsibilities of business in relation to human rights became prominent in the 1990s, as oil, gas, and mining companies expanded into increasingly difficult areas, and as the practice of off-shore production in clothing and footwear drew attention to poor working conditions in global supply chains. Flowing from these concerns two major initiatives were created.

In August 1998, the UN Sub-Commission on the Promotion and Protection of Human Rights established a Working Group on Transnational Corporations. The Working Group similarly attempted to create standards for corporations' human rights obligations. By 2003 they completed the final draft of the "Norms on the Responsibilities of Transnational Corporations and Other Business Enterprises with Regard to Human Rights" (the Norms). While the Norms received support from some NGOs, such as the Europe-Third World Centre (CETIM) or Amnesty International, the document encountered significant opposition from the business sector, and key influential states. The Commission on Human Rights ultimately determined in 2004 that the framework had no legal standing.

In 2005, in an attempt to overcome the divisive debate regarding the human rights responsibilities of businesses, the Human Rights Commission requested the appointment of a special representative of the Secretary-General (SRSG) on the issue of human rights and TNCs. In July 2005, Harvard professor John Ruggie was appointed to this position for an initial two-year period which was then extended for an additional year. In 2008, on completion of his first three-year mandate, Ruggie presented the United Nations Human Rights Council with the "Protect, Respect and Remedy" framework as a conceptual way to anchor the debate. This framework outlined the State duty to protect against business related human rights abuse, the responsibility of companies to respect human rights, and the need to strengthen access to appropriate and effective remedies for victims of business-related human rights abuse. The Human Rights Council welcomed Ruggie's report and extended his mandate until 2011 with the task of "operationalising" and "promoting" the framework. The Human Rights Council asked Ruggie to provide concrete recommendations on how the state could prevent abuses by the private sector, to elaborate on the scope of corporate responsibility, and to explore options for effective remedies available to those whose human rights are impacted by corporate activities.

Over the next three years, Ruggie held extensive consultations with stakeholder groups including governments, businesses, and NGOs. Ruggie intended to create "an authoritative focal point around which actors' expectations could converge—a framework that clarified the relevant actors' responsibilities, and provided the foundation which thinking and action could build over time". Ruggie's work resulted in the UN Guiding Principles on Business and Human Rights, which he presented to the Human Rights Council in June 2011. Ruggie stated,

The Guiding Principles' normative contribution lies not in the creation of new international law obligations but in elaborating the implications of existing standards and practices for states and businesses; integrating them within a single, logically coherent and comprehensive template; and identifying where the current regime falls short and how it could be improved.

The Human Rights Council unanimously endorsed the Guiding Principles, thereby creating the first global standard on this topic.

In June 2011, the Human Rights Council adopted Resolution 17/4, it acknowledged the formal end of the mandate of Ruggie as the SRSG on Human Rights and TNCs and Other Enterprises, and unanimously endorsed the Guiding Principles making them the authoritative global reference point on business and human rights.

Additionally, the Council established a working group to focus on the global dissemination and implementation of the Guiding Principles. OHCHR provides ongoing support and advice to the Working Group, which consists of five independent experts, of balanced regional representation, for a three-year period. Current Working Group Members are: Mr. Surya Deva (Chair from 1 July 2021) (India), since 2016; Ms. Elżbieta Karska (Vice-chair from 1 July 2021) (Poland), since 2018; Mr. Dante Pesce; (Chile), since 2015; Mr. Githu Muigai (Kenya), since 2018; and Ms. Anita Ramasastry (USA), since 2016. The first Forum on Business and Human Rights took place on December 4–5, 2012, in Geneva, Switzerland.

== The three pillars ==
=== State duty to protect human rights ===
The first pillar of the Guiding Principles is the state's duty to protect against human rights abuses through regulation, policymaking, investigation, and enforcement. This pillar reaffirms states' existing obligations under international human rights law, as put forth in the 1948 Universal Declaration of Human Rights.

==== Issues in Conflict-affected areas ====
An area which has been the subject of much scrutiny under the first pillar is in regards to support business respect of human rights in conflict-affected areas under guiding principle 7. The first apparent issue with this principle is the interpretation of the term "conflict-affected areas". This terminology was employed by the SRSG to reflect the intention to expand the principles coverage beyond definitions of armed conflict in international humanitarian law. When defining the application of principle 7, consideration must be given to the flexible definition boundaries that the UNGP, as a soft law instrument, employs and also guidance based nature of the principle. Where the issue with interpretation of principle 7 arises is to what types of conflict are to be left out of the principle.

Another area of uncertainty which exists is in the relation between 'gross abuses' and 'conflict-affected areas' which impact directly on the applicability of principle 7 to serious violations within conflict zones that require home states action to influence companies operating within the area. Gross violations of human rights occurs both in conflict areas, and areas absent of a conflict, such as in repressive States and dictatorships. The question recognised here is whether principle 7 applies to gross abuses in non conflict-affected areas. Additionally, does principle 7 have equal application across democratic, authoritarian, and oppressive States where gross abuses that have arisen in conflicts or is the principles application dependent on the State losing control over its territory.

=== Corporate responsibility to respect ===
Businesses must act with due diligence to avoid infringing on the rights of others and to address any negative impacts. The UNGPs hold that companies have the power to affect virtually all of the internationally recognized rights. Therefore, there is a responsibility of both the state and the private sector to acknowledge their role in upholding and protecting human rights. In conducting due diligence, the UNGP encourage companies to conduct a Human Rights Impact Assessment through which they assess their actual and potential human rights impacts.

=== Access to remedy if these rights are not respected ===
The third pillar addresses both the state's responsibility to provide access to remedy through judicial, administrative, and legislative means, and the corporate responsibility to prevent and remediate any infringement of rights that they contribute to. Having effective grievance mechanisms in place is crucial in upholding the state's duty to protect and the corporate responsibility to respect. The UNGPs dictate that non-judicial mechanisms, whether state-based or independent, should be legitimate, accessible, predictable, rights-compatible, equitable, and transparent. Similarly, Company-level mechanisms are encouraged to operate through dialogue and engagement, rather than with the company acting as the adjudicator of its own actions.

==== Issues with access to home state remedies ====
An issue raised with the third pillar of the Guiding Principles is the challenge of providing effective remedies for victims, particularly with judicial remedy to victims of transnational corporations that operate in more than one state. Ruggie notes that the Guiding Principles are more effective at identifying inadequate access to judicial remedy than fixing it. He conveys that where the guiding principles fall short is that they set out to identify obstacles and encourage States to overcome them, but fail to ensure it occurs in practice. The Guiding Principles failed to recognise the power imbalance in terms of resources and information between victims of corporate abuse and the businesses themselves. Another issue relates to the Commentary to Guiding Principle 2 which provides that home states "are permitted" to take measures ensuring access to remedies. This language has been heavily criticised for being timid and unambiguous where victims of abuse by multinational corporations routinely face insurmountable obstacles to remedy in the host state and have no other place to turn for help. Here the Guiding Principles have failed to specifically provide clear guidance on how to navigate the procedural and substantive barriers to home state remedies and failed to elaborate on 'governance gaps' to assist home states to implement mechanisms ensuring their corporations do not violate human rights abroad. Additionally, commentators have also raised concerns regarding the over-emphasis on non-judicial mechanisms and voluntary mechanisms which do not guarantee victims sufficient protection against business-related human rights abuses. What is suggested is that the Guiding Principles should have established comprehensive remedies that are legally binding and consistent with human rights obligations of states and businesses both in the host state and home state. Effective local capacity is the preferred option to guarantee general access to civil judicial remedies in the long run.

== Response and implementation ==
The UNGPs have enjoyed widespread uptake and support from both the public and private sectors, and several companies have publicly stated their support. For example, the Coca-Cola Company "strongly endorsed" the UNGPs, calling them "a foundation and flexible framework for companies like ours", and General Electric wrote that the UNGPs "helped to clarify the distinct interrelated roles and responsibilities of states and business entities in this area" and that they would "no doubt serve as a lasting beacon for businesses entities seeking (to) grow their service and product offerings while respecting human rights". The UNGPs have also faced criticism, particularly from human rights NGOs such as Human Rights Watch, who argue that the lack of an enforcement mechanism, "they cannot actually require companies to do anything at all. Companies can reject the principles altogether without consequence—or publicly embrace them while doing absolutely nothing to put them into practice."

The UNGPs have generated lessons for international law, particularly concerning the role of non-State actors in international law and also the evolving significance of soft law sources. The success of the UNGPs may be attributed to the role played by non-State actors, especially in this context, the lobbying of the business community. What the influence of the UNGPs stands to illustrate is that the development of international law norms such as those concerning diplomacy and international organisations will continue to draw on contributions of State actors. However, the development in areas such as international economic law and international environmental law which directly impact non-State actors, may require a different approach from the traditional State-centred process and draw on the observations and inputs of non-state actors if effective laws are to be created in these areas.

=== A legally-binding instrument ===
Despite the support from the public and private sectors, some stakeholders questioned whether the UNGPs set a sufficiently high standard for businesses, arguing that the private sector should have an "obligation" to realise rights, rather than simply a "responsibility". Others argued that the UNGPs needed an overarching accountability mechanism that could make the framework legally enforceable. Supporters, however, defend the UNGPs for creating far more consensus than any previous attempt at creating a global business-human rights standard.

The debate about the sufficiency of a voluntary soft-law approach that underlie the Guiding Principles, however, reopened in September 2013 when Ecuador, backed by 84 governments proposed a binding legal instrument for TNC operations in order "to provide appropriate protection, justice and remedy to the victims of human rights abuses directly resulting from or related to the activities of some transnational corporations and other business enterprises." The call was backed by more than 530 civil society organisations (CSOs) and in June 2014 was backed by a majority of the UN Human Rights Council which agreed to establish an open-ended intergovernmental working group mandated to draft a binding instrument.

==== Scope ====
An issue raised by Ruggie with regards to the introduction of a legally binding international business and human rights treaty is determining the scope and scale of such an instrument. One view is that a treaty would be more effective than the UNGPs in specific areas of business and human rights. For example, a treaty could explicitly refer to the rights of Indigenous peoples or recognise labour rights beyond those established in the UNGPs. Conversely, Ruggie has long illustrated his strong objection to any attempt to shoehorning the entire complex of business and human rights issues into a single, overarching international legal instrument. His explanation is that business and human rights involves a wide range of diverse problems, legal and institutional variations, as well as conflicting interest between and within States. Furthermore, a general business and human rights treaty would have to be constructed at such a high level of abstraction that any practical applicability would be diminished. In this sense, the UNGPs are more favourable because being a "soft law" instrument has allow them be comprehensive and more appealing to Governments.

==== Relationship with Guiding Principles ====
The prospect of a legally-binding treaty raises questions as to the potential for tension between the proposed binding instrument and the UNGPs and ensuring the treaty-making process does not undermine the progress made under UNGPs. Sceptics of a comprehensive binding treaty stressed the need to recognise the risk associated with a bad treaty that would create issues from a civil society perspective such as having principles that may be widely agreed upon by states, but lack clarity in what they require in practice. Others have suggested that the text itself has serious deficiencies as legal text even for those who embrace its objectives and raises serious and fundamental policy issues which carry over from the initial "Zero Draft." Conversely, others have conveyed that a binding instrument in conjunction with other initiatives, such as the UNGPs, would further developing international law in this area as it would complement existing instruments. This perspective depicts a proposed treaty to be just one aspect within a developing comprehensive system aimed at regulating business and human rights.

==== Enforcement ====
Another fundamental issue which has been raised is how such a treaty would be enforced, seeing as inadequate enforcement is highlighted as the main shortcoming of the UNGPs. Ruggie, in his contemplation questions whether a realistic prospect would be to establish an international court for corporations or whether such a treaty could be enforced by states. In his analysis, Ruggie sided with the former highlighting that where a State ratifies a treaty, it already has obligations to protect individuals against human rights breaches by third parties within their territories. So to add any new value, treaty enforcement provisions would have to involve extraterritorial jurisdiction which, despite being supported by some UN human rights treaty bodies, is conveyed by the conduct of states to be an unacceptable means to address violations of human rights. States that have not ratified a core UN or ILO human rights instrument are very unlikely to support or enforce a treaty imposing obligations on the overseas operations of their MNCs.

== See also ==
- Corporate social responsibility
- Office of the United Nations High Commissioner for Human Rights
