= Mary Ruggie =

American sociologist

Mary C. Ruggie (née Zacharuk; born 1945) is an American sociologist and professor at Harvard Kennedy School.

Ruggie completed a B.A. in sociology (1970), M.A. in education (1971) and Ph.D. in sociology (1980) at University of California, Berkeley. Her doctoral advisor was Philip Selznick.

Ruggie worked at Barnard College, University of California, San Diego, Columbia University, and the Harvard Kennedy School. She teaches courses on social theory, gender, comparative welfare states, health care, and health policy.

Ruggie met her husband, John Ruggie, in high school. They have a son.

== Selected works ==
- Ruggie, Mary (1984). The State and Working Women: A Comparative Study of Britain and Sweden. Princeton University Press. ISBN 978-0-691-09407-6.
- Ruggie, Mary (1996). Realignments in the Welfare State: Health Policy in the United States, Britain, and Canada. Columbia University Press. ISBN 978-0-231-10485-2.
- Ruggie, Mary (2004). Marginal to Mainstream: Alternative Medicine in America. Cambridge University Press. ISBN 0-521-54222-7. OCLC 300284830.
- Cohen, Michael H.; Ruggie, Mary; Micozzi, Marc S. (2006). The Practice of Integrative Medicine: A Legal and Operational Guide. Springer Publishing Company. ISBN 978-0-8261-0307-9.
