= Donatella della Porta =

Italian sociologist and political scientist

Donatella della Porta (born in 1956 in Catania) is an Italian sociologist and political scientist. She is a professor of political science and political sociology at the Scuola Normale Superiore. She has studied and worked in major social science institutions all over the world. She is known for her research in the areas of social movements, corruption, political violence, police, and policies of public order. In 2022, she was named a member of the American Academy of Arts and Sciences.

== Academic career ==
Since 2015 Della Porta is Full Professor of Sociology and the founding Dean of the Faculty of Political and Social Sciences at the Scuola Normale Superiore. Between 2003 and 2014, she served as Full Professor of Political Sociology at the European University Institute. Previously, she had been Full Professor of Political Science, president of the corso di laurea in Administrative Sciences, and Director of the Department of Political Science and Sociology at the University of Florence.

In 1981 Della Porta received a Diplôme d'Etudes Approfondies at the École des Hautes Études en Sciences Sociales of Paris under the supervision of Alain Touraine, and she earned her Ph.D. in political and social sciences at the European University Institute in Florence in 1987 under the supervision of Philippe C. Schmitter. She worked with Alessandro Pizzorno during her postdoctoral studies at the European University Institute until she moved to the Wissenschaftszentum Berlin für Sozialforschung (WZB Berlin Social Science Center) to participate in the establishment of the "Social Movements and the Public Sphere" department between 1988 and 1993. She obtained her undergraduate degree in Political Science at the University of Catania.

Della Porta directs COSMOS - Center on Social Movement Studies actually at the Scuola Normale Superiore, the DEMOS project (Democracy in Europe and the Mobilisation of the Society) founded by the European Commission. She also coordinated the Gruppo di Ricerca sull'azione collettiva in Europa (GRACE).

Della Porta has conducted research also at Cornell University, Ithaca College, and at the Wissenschaftszentrum Berlin für Sozialforschung.

Her main research interests concern social movements, political violence, terrorism, corruption, police and policies of public order. On these issues she has conducted investigations in democratization processes in Europe (particularly, Italy, France, Germany and Spain), the Middle East, Asia and Latin America.

She has supervised hundreds PhD students in total at PhD programs of the University of Florence, the European University Institute, and the Scuola Normale Superiore, coming from different countries and working, among others, on topics such as but not limited to democratization, social movements, civil society, migration, peace, from fields such as but not limited to political sociology, political science, international relations, and political theory.

Throughout her life, Donatella Della Porta has engaged in institution building. Since 2015 and until 2021, she has been the Founding Dean of the Faculty of Political and Social Sciences at the Scuola Normale Superiore. Located in Florence, the Faculty now hosts two PhD programs, one on Political Science and Sociology (that she directs since 2015) and one in Transnational Governance, with a faculty of 15 members, about 60 PhD students and about 12 post-docs. At the SNS, she is also the Director of the Centre on Social Movement Studies (Cosmos), which she founded in 2012 at the European University Institute and, since November 2015, moved to the Scuola normale superiore in Florence. She has also been the founding co-editor of the major journal European Political Science Review.

== Awards ==
She has received prestigious international awards, prizes and recognitions for her studies in field. She took an Advanced Scholars Grant on "Mobilizing for democracy" of the European Research Council between 2011 and 2016. She has been the Director of the Research Project on “Democracy in Europe and the mobilization of the society, financed by the European Commission in 2003-2006 and participated as principal investigator in other four major international research consortia financed by the European Commission. In 2021, she has been awarded a major grant for a research on solidarity initiatives from the Volkswagen Stiftung.

=== Honoris causa and major prizes ===
John D. McCarthy Award for Lifetime Achievement in the Scholarship of Social Movements and Collective Behavior, in 2024.

Nominated member of the Accademia dei Lincei in 2023.

Nominated International Honorary Member of the American Academy of Arts and Sciences (in April 2022)

Forschungspreise of the Alexander von Humboldt Stiftung awarded in November 2021 for life achievements

Mattei Dogan Prize, awarded in 2011, for distinguished achievements in the field of political sociology

Research grant of the Alexander von Humboldt Stiftung

Harry Frank Guggenheim Career Development Award in 1990

Nomination to the European Academy in 2012

Member of the General Prize Committee of the Balzan Foundation

== Publications ==
Highly read and cited Ex Citations Google Scholar (February 2025): 57995 citations.; h-index 101), she has influenced the international academic debates, among others on democracy and democratization, social movements, political violence, local governments, corruption, the police and protest policing. The author, co-author or editor of about 100 books, she has published with main international academic presses. A selection of her books in English includes Social Movements: An introduction, 3rd edition (Blackwell, 2020); Discoursive Turns and Critical Junctures (Oxford University Press, 2020), Can Social Movements Save Democracy? (Polity, 2020), Legacies and Memories in Movements (Oxford University Press, 2018); Movement Parties in Times of Austerity (Polity 2017), Where did the Revolution go? (Cambridge University Press, 2016); Social Movements in Times of Austerity (Polity 2015), Mobilizing for democracy. Comparing 1989 and 2011 (Oxford University Press 2014); Methodological practices in social movement research (Oxford University Press, 2014); Can Democracy be Saved? (Polity Press, 2013), Clandestine Political Violence (Cambridge University Press, 2013), Blackwell Encyclopedia on Social and Political Movement ( Blackwell. 2013 and 2022); Mobilizing on the Extreme Right (Oxford University Press, 2012); Meeting Democracy (Cambridge University Press, 2012);; Europeanization and Social Movements (Oxford University Press 2008, Social Movements, Political Violence and the state (Cambridge University Press 1995). In Italy, she has mainly published with Il Mulino, Laterza and Feltrinelli.

Books (Most recent):

- Della Porta, D. Regressive movements in pandemic times, Oxford: Oxford University Press, 2023
- Della Porta, D., R. Chesta, L. Cini, 2022, Labour conflicts in the digital age, Bristol: Bristol University Press
- Della Porta, Donatella N Bertuzzi, D Chironi, C Milan, M Portos, L Zamponi 2022, Resisting the Backlash: Street Protest in Italy, London, Routledge.
- Della Porta, D. 2022 Contentious Politics in Emergency Critical Juncture: Progressive social movements during the pandemic, Cambridge: Cambridge University Press,
- Della Porta, Donatella and Mario Diani, Social Movements: An introduction, 3rd edition, Blackwell, 2020
- (With M. Keating, eds.), Approaches and Methodologies in the Social Sciences. A Pluralist Perspective, Cambridge, Cambridge University Press, 2008.

Articles in refereed journals (Most recent):

- G. Bonu Rosenkranz, D della Porta 2024 Disentangling intersectionality in action: the new cycle of contention of feminist movements in Italy, European Journal of Politics and Gender, 1–23
- D. Della Porta (2024) Moral panic and repression: The contentious politics of anti-Semitism in Germany Partecipazione e Conflitto 17 (2), 276–349
- S. Christou, D Della Porta 2024 Contesting patents on COVID-19 vaccines in the EU: the no profit on pandemic campaignJournal of European Public Policy, 1-26
- D. della Porta, S Hunger, S Hutter, A Lavizzari (2024) Expanding protest event analysis through videos, Mobilization: An International Quarterly 29 (2), 245–26
- D. della Porta, G Del Panta (2024), Mobilising in a (former)-red subculture industrial district: the case of the No-Keu permanent assembly, Territory, Politics, Governance, 1–17
- D. Della Porta, M Antonelli, 2024 Risorse di potere e nuovi conflitti: il caso di Mondo Convenienza, QUADERNI DI RASSEGNA SINDACALE. LAVORI, 71–81
- D. Della Porta L Westerheuser (2024) Quanto conta la classe, Parolechiave 34(1), 53–72.
- D. della Porta (2024) Still the resurgence of class conflict? New identies, new interest, new worker mobilization in the work of Alessandro Pizzorno (Stato e Mercato 44 (1): 135–148
- J Earl, JJ Grimm, S Malthaner, D della Porta, S Hunger, S Hutter MOBILIZATION FORUM ON “VIDEO PROTEST EVENT ANALYSIS” Mobilization: An International Quarterly 29 (2), 263–278
- D. Della Porta, LR Parks, M Portos (2024) Social movements and Europeanisation: framing ‘responsibility’and ‘responsiveness’ in times of multiple crises, Journal of European Public Policy 31 (4), 1100–1125

F Bloise, D Chironi, D della Porta, M Pianta (2024) Inequality and Elections in Italy, 1994–2018, Italian Economic Journal 10 (1), 1–23

- D. Della Porta, M Antonelli 2024 Risorse di potere e nuovi conflitti: il caso di Mondo Convenienza QUADERNI DI RASSEGNA SINDACALE. LAVORI, 71–81
- D. della Porta, A Lavizzari, H Reiter, M Sommer, E Steinhilper, F Ajayi (2023), Patterns of adaptation and recontextualisation: The transnational diffusion of Black Lives Matter to Italy and Germany, European Journal of Cultural and Political Sociology 10 (4), 653–677
- D. della Porta (2023) Notes on Sidney Tarrow's Movements and Parties PARTECIPAZIONE E CONFLITTO 15 (3), 967–969
