= Protest policing =

Police response to political dissent

Seattle Police Department officers at the George Floyd protests, 2020

Protest policing or public order policing is part of a state’s response to political dissent and social movements. Police maintenance of public order during protest is an essential component of liberal democracy, with military response to protest being more common under authoritarian regimes.

Australasian, European, and North American democratic states have all experienced increased surveillance of protest movements and more militarized protest policing since 1995 and through the first decades of the 21st century.

Criminalization of dissent is legislation or law enforcement that penalizes political dissent. It may also be accomplished through media that controls public discourse to delegitimize critics of the state. Study of protest criminalization places protest policing in a broader framework of criminology and sociology of law.

== Description ==
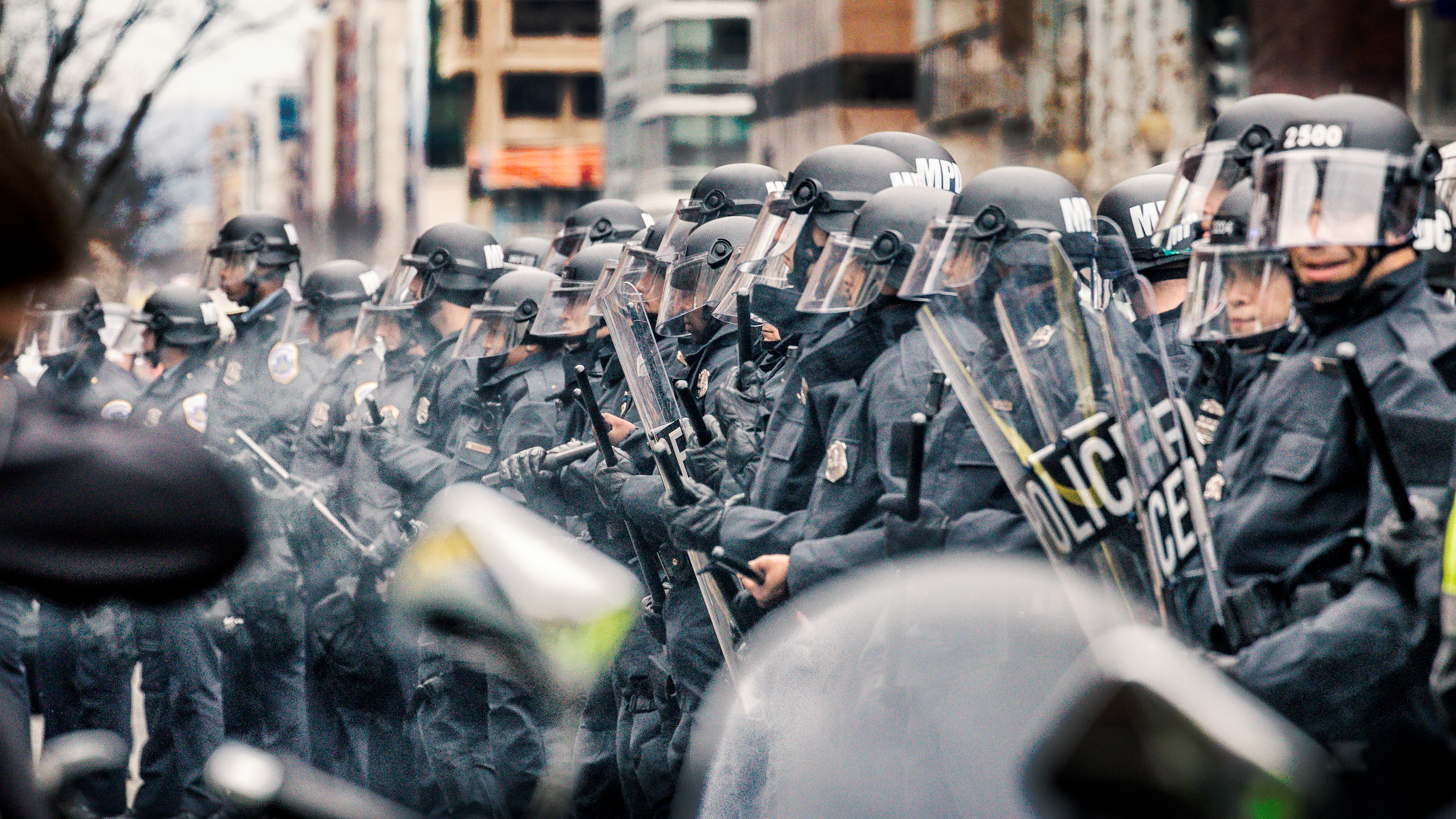
Riot police at a protest in Washington, D.C.

Under authoritarian regimes, protest policing tends to be violent and has resulted in massacres. Police in more democratic societies must undertake a delicate balance between public order and protection of citizens’ rights to public participation, right to protest, and freedom of assembly, which are central democratic values.

There are varying styles of protest policing, expressed by varying degree of tolerance toward protestors.

Institutional variables that affect policing style include:

- Legislation on individual freedom
- Organizational structure of the police, including the degree of centralization, accountability, and militarization
- Police culture, which shapes discretionary actions of individual officers

Protest policing style is also shaped by social movements, public opinion, and police knowledge of protestors.

== Strategies ==
Academic study of protest policing has identified several protest policing strategies.

Escalating force is a legalistic and repressive approach toward protest.

Negotiated management is a communication-based approach emphasizing negotiation with protestors.

Strategic incapacitation is a policing strategy that emphasizes less lethal weapons like tasers or tear gas; kettling; no-protest zones; and surveillance or information campaigns to manage protests.

Militarized protest policing sees protest as a threat, negotiates incoherently, and uses indiscriminate surveillance and coercive strategies to suppress protest. It is associated with the “strategic incapacitation” approach to protest policing.

== History ==
Protest policing began to attract attention of social scientists as a field of study beginning in the 1980s when several researchers launched quantitative, ethnographic, and case studies of protest policing. The book Policing Protest (1998), edited by Donatella della Porta and Herbert Reiter, was a notable early work in the field. When it was written, empirical studies of protest policing in western democracies were uncommon. Most of the literature in protest policing has studied policing strategies in Western countries between about 1940 and the 2020s.

Since about the 19th century, in Western democratic states, the military has had a smaller role in maintaining public order during protests, and this has been seen as the role of the police. Since World War II, modern states have consistently decoupled police forces from the political regime they function under, leading to greater independence of police agencies in making protest management decisions.

The escalating force strategy of protest policing was common in Western countries during the 1950s – 1970s.

The wave of protests in 1968 had a profound impact on protest policing, with many countries moving away from the escalating force model and adopting negotiated management of protests. In 1998, studies found that protest policing in liberal democracies emphasized peacekeeping over law enforcement and was characterized by negotiation, tolerance of civil disobedience, and broad surveillance.

Beginning approximately with the 1999 protests against the World Trade Organization (WTO) in Seattle, a global justice protest movement arose that targeted international organizations like the World Bank, the World Economic Forum, and the WTO. Policing of the global justice movement became increasingly militarized in Western countries between 1999 and 2006. Throughout the first decades of the 21st century, liberal democracies have increasingly policed dissent through strategic incapacitation, especially in conflicts related to the environmental justice or global justice movements, and when protests are seen as “transgressive”.

Police increasingly viewed protests as a security threat after the September, 11, 2001 attack on the World Trade Center.

During the COVID-19 pandemic, states imposed additional restrictions on political demonstrations, enabling police to sanction protestors for violation of these additional rules.

=== Criminalization of protest ===
Police response to the global justice movement in liberal democracies during the early decades of the 21st century as well as various environmental movements around the world have prompted several studies about criminalization of protest that place protest policing in a broader framework of criminology and sociology.

Dissent is criminalized through a variety of processes. These include the making of new laws or increasing penalties for existing laws; control of discourse about protest to delegitimize dissent and frame it as a security problem or “terrorism”; and impunity for officials that violate human rights or refuse to investigate abuses against political dissidents.

Criminalization of dissent is often most severe in authoritarian countries, resulting in cruel punishments or even killings of protestors. However, both authoritarian and democratic states have restricted the right to protest; and criminalization of dissent has been “firmly entrenched” in liberal democracies since their origin.

Criminalization of dissent may also take the form of intimidation, disappearances, or violence against human rights defenders or political dissidents. It may also occur as a discursive battle that frames defense of human rights or the environment as a threat to national security. “Thus, a main component of criminalization is legitimizing the repression of the peaceful and democratic conduct of community members, transforming them into public enemies and accusing them of illegitimate violence, delinquency, terrorism, etc.”
