= Good citizenship =

When one is considered to properly fulfill their role as a citizen

A good citizen is an individual who takes the initiative to improve their country.

There are many opinions as to what constitutes a good citizen. Aristotle makes a distinction between the good citizen and the good man, writing, "...there cannot be a single absolute excellence of the good citizen. But the good man is so called in virtue of a single absolute excellence. It is thus clear that it is possible to be a good citizen without possessing the excellence which is the quality of a good man." Specifically, in his view, the good citizen is measured in relation to ruling and being ruled, the good man only in ruling. Some of the ambiguity is likely due to more than one Greek word being translated "good."

Theodore Roosevelt said, "The first requisite of a good citizen in this Republic of ours is that he shall be able and willing to pull his own weight; that he shall not be a mere passenger, but shall do his share in the work that each generation of us finds ready to hand; and, furthermore, that in doing his work he shall show, not only the capacity for sturdy self-help, but also self-respecting regard for the rights of others."

High school seniors define good citizens primarily in political terms. Some students define good citizenship in terms of standing up for what one believes in. Joel Westheimer identifies the personally responsible citizen (who acts responsibly in his community, e.g. by donating blood), the participatory citizen (who is an active member of community organizations and/or improvement efforts) and the justice-oriented citizen (who critically assesses social, political, and economic structures to see beyond surface causes) as three different types of "good citizen."

== Education ==
Education is sometimes viewed as a prerequisite to good citizenship, in that it helps citizens make good decisions and deal with demagogues who would delude them. Roger Soder writes that in a democracy, where the demands of good citizenship are placed upon all, "only the common schools can provide to all the education that all need."

Science literacy is also frequently touted as a key to good citizenship. Good citizenship is sometimes viewed as requiring both intellectual skills (such as critical thinking) and participatory skills (such as deliberating civilly, monitoring the government, building coalitions, managing conflict peacefully and fairly, and petitioning, speaking or testifying before public bodies).

== Women and children ==
Henry David Thoreau wrote that woman who serve the state making "no free exercise whatever of the judgment or of the moral sense...are commonly esteemed good citizens."

Orit Ichilov notes that children "tend to perceive the government in the image of an ideal father that is benevolent and protective. At this stage, the good citizen is characterized as one who, through his behavior, proves himself one worthy of the love and protection of the government rather than one possessing certain political obligations and rights." Through their early school years, children usually continue to think in apolitical terms of their citizenship, expressing loyalty by their attachment to its beauty, wildlife, and good people. By age twelve or thirteen, they begin referring more to political qualities, such as the nature and values of the regime.

== Incentives ==
Sometimes incentives prevail over desires to be a good citizen. For example, many people will avoid coming forth as witnesses in court cases because they do not want to deal with the inconvenience and red tape.

Many organizations attempt to promote "good citizenship." For example, the Boy Scouts of America published Scouting for Boys: A Handbook for Instruction in Good Citizenship, and the Ontario Medal for Good Citizenship is given to those who are deemed to have made outstanding contributions to the well being of their communities without expectation of remuneration or reward. Another non-profit organization, Good Citizen, has a mission to teach Americans how to be effective citizens and focuses on 100 citizen actions.

== See also ==
- Civic virtue
