= John Ruggie =

American political scientist (1944–2021)

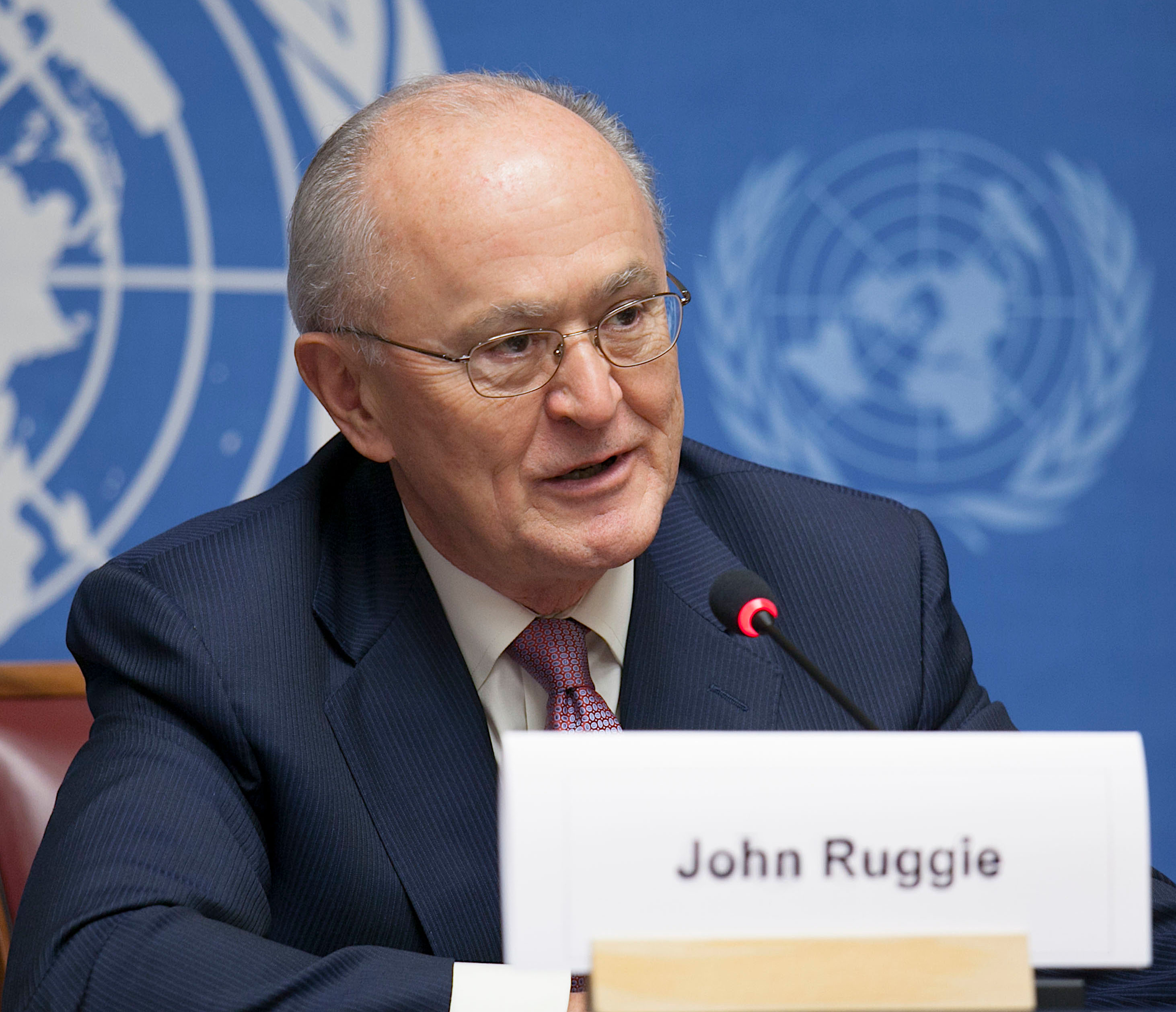
- Ruggie in 2012
- Born: John Gerard Ruggie; 18 October 1944; Graz, Austria
- Died: 16 September 2021 (aged 76)
- Spouse: Mary Ruggie
- Children: 1

Academic background
- Education: McMaster University (BA); University of California, Berkeley (PhD)
- Influences: Ernst B. Haas

Academic work
- Discipline: International relations
- Institutions: Columbia University; Harvard University

John Gerard Ruggie (18 October 1944 – 16 September 2021) was the Berthold Beitz Research Professor in Human Rights and International Affairs at Harvard Kennedy School at Harvard University and an affiliated professor in international legal studies at Harvard Law School.

He was an influential scholar in the field of international relations, as well as an influential policy-maker in the United Nations. In the field of international relations, Ruggie made contributions to international regimes, constructivism, epistemes, multilateralism, and embedded liberalism. His 1982 article on embedded liberalism is the most widely cited article in international political economy.

== Early life and education ==
Ruggie was born in Graz, Austria in 1944 and raised in Toronto, Canada.

He had a BA in politics and history from McMaster University in Canada.

Ruggie moved to the United States to attend graduate school, earning a PhD in political science from the University of California, Berkeley. At Berkeley, Ruggie was influenced by Ernst B. Haas.

== Career ==
=== Academic appointments ===
Ruggie taught at Columbia University, becoming Dean of the School of International and Public Affairs. He also taught at the University of California's Berkeley and San Diego campuses and directed the UC system-wide Institute on Global Conflict and Cooperation. He joined Harvard Kennedy School's faculty in 2001.

=== United Nations work ===
From 1997 to 2001, Ruggie served as United Nations Assistant Secretary-General for Strategic Planning, a post created specifically for him by then Secretary-General Kofi Annan. He was one of the architects of the United Nations Global Compact as well as of the Millennium Development Goals, the precursor of the Sustainable Development Goals. In 2001 Annan and the UN as a whole were awarded the Nobel Peace Prize for, among other achievements, "bringing new life to the organization." In 2005, Annan appointed Ruggie as the UN Secretary-General's Special Representative for Business and Human Rights. In that capacity, he developed a set of principles, the UN Guiding Principles on Business and Human Rights, which the UN Human Rights Council endorsed unanimously in 2011. They are also known as the "Ruggie principles" or the "Ruggie framework". The Guiding Principles have since served as the global soft law standard in this space, and a number of jurisdictions continue to incorporate their elements into hard law.

=== Scholarly work ===
Ruggie introduced the concepts of international regimes and epistemic communities into the international relations field; he adapted from Karl Polanyi the term "embedded liberalism" to explain the post-World War II international economic order; and he was a major contributor to the emergence of the constructivist approach to international relations theorizing, which takes seriously the roles of norms, ideas and identities, alongside other factors, in determining international outcomes. A survey in Foreign Policy magazine named him as one of the 25 most influential international relations scholars in the United States and Canada. His book Just Business: Multinational Corporations and Human Rights has been translated into Chinese, Japanese, Korean, Portuguese, and Spanish.

Ruggie's 1982 article on embedded liberalism is the most highly cited study in IPE scholarship.

== Awards and recognition ==
Ruggie had a Doctor of Laws (honoris causa) from McMaster; and a Doctor of Letters (honoris causa) from the University of Waterloo.

A fellow of the American Academy of Arts and Sciences, Ruggie received a Guggenheim Fellowship. He also received the International Studies Association's Distinguished Scholar Award and the American Political Science Association's Hubert Humphrey Award for outstanding public service by a political scientist; the AS.K. social science prize from the WZB Berlin Social Science Center; as well as awards from the American Bar Association and the Washington Foreign Law Society, the latter honoring "an individual who has made an outstanding contribution to the development and application of international law."

== Board memberships ==
Ruggie chaired the Board of the nonprofit organization Shift, the leading center of expertise in business and human rights, working with businesses, governments, workers organization, financial institutions and civil society to implement the UN Guiding Principles.

He was on the Board of the Arabesque Group, an ESG data provider and asset manager, as well as on Unilever's Sustainability Advisory Council.

He was previously the Chair of the Institute for Human Rights and Business (IHRB) from 2012 to 2016, and served as its Patron until his death in 2021.

== Death ==
John Ruggie died on 16 September 2021. Ruggie was married to his wife Mary Ruggie. They had one son, Andreas.

== See also ==
- International relations theory
- Constructivism in international relations
