= Rio Declaration on Environment and Development =

1992 short document

The Rio Declaration on Environment and Development, often shortened to Rio Declaration, was a short document produced at the 1992 United Nations Conference on Environment and Development (UNCED), informally known as the Earth Summit. The Rio Declaration consisted of 27 principles intended to guide countries in future sustainable development. It was signed by over 175 countries.

== History ==
The Rio Conference, which adopted the Declaration, took place from 3 to 14 June 1992. Subsequently, the international community has met twice to assess the progress made in implementing the principles of the document; first in New York City in 1997 during a General Assembly Session of the UN, and then in Johannesburg in 2002. While the document helped to raise environmental awareness, evidence from 2007 suggested that little of the document's environmental goals had at that time been achieved.

== Content ==
Referring to the "integral and interdependent nature of the Earth, "our home", the Rio Declaration proclaims 27 principles. The first principle states that sustainable development primarily concerns human beings, who are entitled to live healthy and productive lives in harmony with nature. Article 11 creates an expectation that states will enact environmental legislation. Further articles include formulations of the precautionary principle, which should be "widely applied by states according to their capabilities" (principle 15), and of the polluter pays principle, which states are encouraged to adopt where it is in the public interest to do so and it will not distort international trade and investment (principle 16). The final principle invites fulfillment of the other principles in a spirit of good faith.

The Rio Declaration expresses a positive view of traditional ecological knowledge.

== See also ==
- Three generations of human rights
