= Civic virtue =

Set of moral qualities that promote the common good

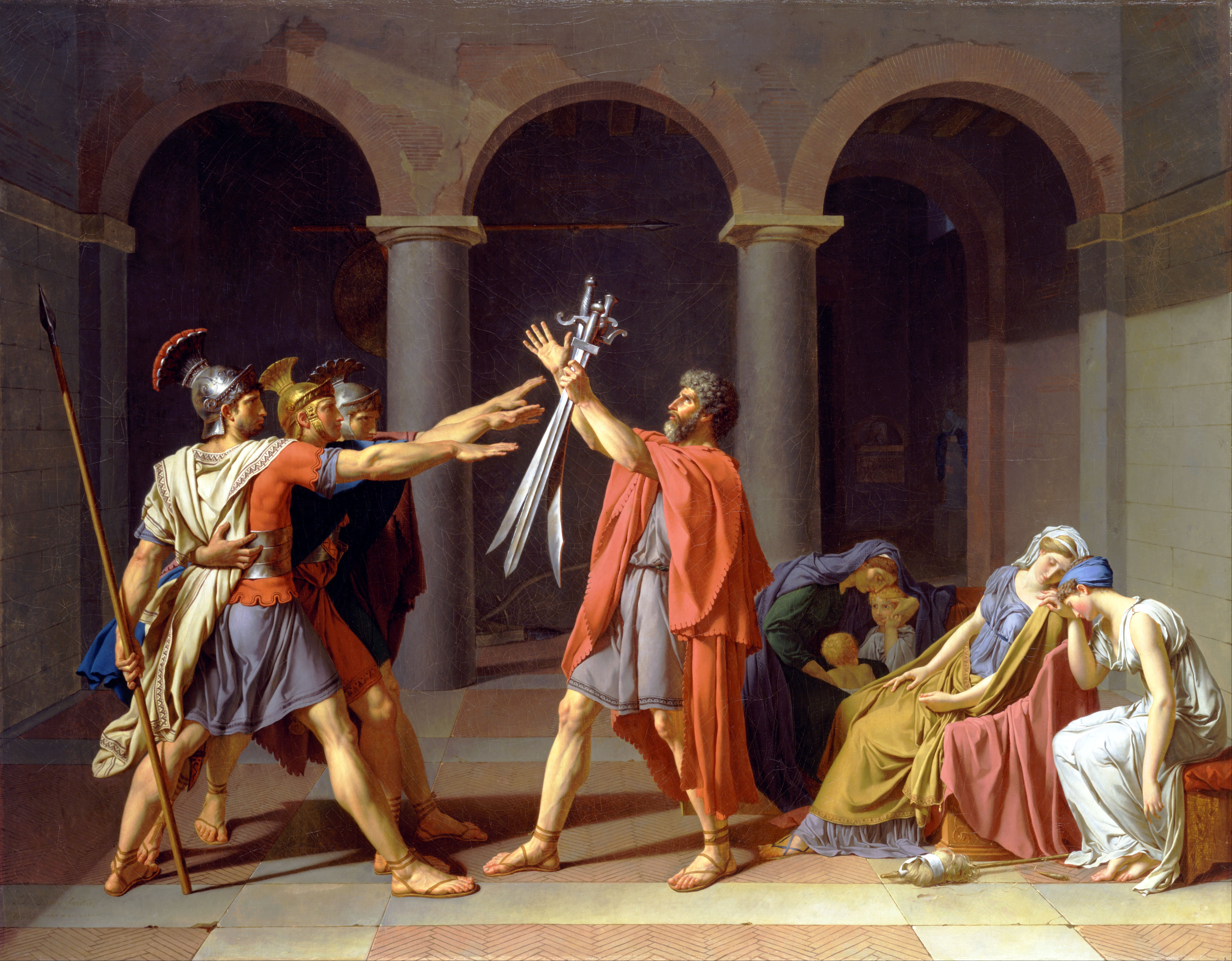
Jacques-Louis David's 1786 painting The Oath of the Horatii, illustrating a dramatic moment from Livy's history of Rome, embodies 18th-century ideas about civic virtue.

Civic virtue is a concept that refers to the set of habits, values, and attitudes that promote the general welfare and the effective functioning of a society. Closely linked to the concept of citizenship, civic virtue (virtus) represents, therefore, the disposition of citizens to put the common good (bonum commune) before special interests. The identification of the character traits that constitute civic virtue has been a major concern of political philosophy. The term civility refers to behavior between persons and groups that conforms to a social mode (that is, in accordance with the civil society), as itself being a foundation of society and law.

== In republics ==
Civic virtues are historically taught as a matter of chief concern in nations under republican forms of government, and societies with cities. When final decisions on public matters are made by a monarch, it is the monarch's virtues which influence those decisions. When a broader class of people become the decision-makers, it is then their virtues which characterize the types of decisions made. This form of decision-making is considered superior in determining what best protects the interests of the majority. Aristocratic oligarchies may also develop traditions of public lists of virtues they believe appropriate in the governing class, but these virtues differ from the general civic virtues; for example, ruling class virtues stress martial courage over commercial honesty. Constitutions became important in defining the public virtue of republics and constitutional monarchies. The earliest forms of constitutional development can be seen in late medieval Germany (see Communalism before 1800) and in the Dutch and English revolts of the 16th and 17th centuries.

=== In ancient Greece and Rome ===
In the classical culture of Europe and those places that follow its political tradition, concern for civic virtue starts with the oldest republics of which we have extensive records, Athens and Rome. Attempting to define the virtues needed to successfully govern the Athenian polis was a matter of significant concern for Socrates and Plato; a difference in civic vision ultimately was one of the factors that led to the trial of Socrates and his conflict with the Athenian democracy. The Politics of Aristotle viewed citizenship as consisting, not of political rights, but rather of political duties. Citizens were expected to put their private lives and interests aside and serve the state in accordance with duties defined by law.

Rome, even more than Greece, produced a number of moralistic philosophers such as Cicero, and moralistic historians such as Tacitus, Sallust, Plutarch and Livy. Many of these figures were either personally involved in power struggles that took place in the late Roman Republic, or wrote elegies to liberty which was lost during their transition to the Roman Empire. They tended to blame this loss of liberty on the perceived lack of civic virtue in their contemporaries, contrasting them with idealistic examples of virtue drawn from Roman history, and even non-Roman "barbarians".

=== During the Medieval age and the Renaissance ===
Texts of antiquity became very popular by the Renaissance. Scholars tried to gather as many of them as they could find, especially in monasteries, from Constantinople, and from the Muslim world. Aided by the rediscovery of the virtue ethics and metaphysics of Aristotle by Avicenna and Averroes, Thomas Aquinas fused Aristotle's cardinal virtues with Christianity in his Summa Theologica (1273).

Humanists wanted to reinstate the ancient ideal of civic virtue through education. Instead of punishing sinners, it was believed that sin could be prevented by raising virtuous children. Living in the city became important for the elite, because people in the city are forced to behave themselves when communicating with others. A problem was that the proletarianization of peasants created an environment in cities where such workers were hard to control. Cities tried to keep the proletarians out or tried to civilize them by forcing them to work in poor houses. Important aspects of civic virtue were: civic conversation (listening to others, trying to reach an agreement, keeping yourself informed so you can have a relevant contribution), civilized behavior (decent clothing, accent, containing feelings and needs), work (people had to make a useful contribution to the society). Religion changed. It became more focused on individual behavior instead of a communion of people. The people who believed in civic virtue belonged to a small majority surrounded by "barbarity". Parental authority was popular, especially the authority of the monarch and the state.

=== During the Enlightenment ===
Civic virtue was very popular during the Enlightenment but it had changed dramatically. Parental authority began to wane. Freedom became popular. But people can only be free by containing their emotions in order to keep some space for others. Trying to keep proletarians out or putting them in a poor house was not done anymore. The focus was now on educating. Work was an important virtue during the Middle Ages and the Renaissance, but the people who worked were treated with contempt by the non-working elite. The 18th century brought an end to this. The advancing rich merchants class emphasized the importance of work and contributing to society for all people including the elite. Science was popular. The government and the elites tried to change the world and humanity positively by expanding the bureaucracy. Leading thinkers thought that education and the breach of barriers would liberate everybody from stupidity and oppression. Civic conversations were held in societies and scientific journals.

=== In the republican revolutions of the 18th century ===
Civic virtue also became a matter of public interest and discussion during the 18th century, in part because of the American Revolutionary War. An anecdote first published in 1906 has Benjamin Franklin answer a woman who asked him, "Well, Doctor, what have we got – a Republic or a Monarchy?" He responded: "A Republic, if you can keep it." The current use for this quotation is to bolster with Franklin's authority the opinion that republics require the cultivation of specific political beliefs, interests, and habits among their citizens, and that if those habits are not cultivated, they are in danger of falling back into some sort of authoritarian rule, such as a monarchy.

American historian Gordon S. Wood called it a universal 18th-century assumption that, while no form of government was more beautiful than a republic, monarchies had various advantages: the pomp and circumstances surrounding them cultivated a sense that the rulers were in fact superior to the ruled and entitled to their obedience, and maintained order by their presence. By contrast, in a republic, the rulers were the servants of the public, and there could therefore be no sustained coercion from them. Laws had to be obeyed for the sake of conscience, rather than fear of the ruler's wrath. In a monarchy, people might be restrained by force to submit their own interest to their government's. In a republic, by contrast, people must be persuaded to submit their own interests to the government, and this voluntary submission constituted the 18th century's notion of civic virtue. In the absence of such persuasion, the authority of the government would collapse, and tyranny or anarchy were imminent.

Authority for this ideal was found once more among the classical, and especially the Roman, political authors and historians. But since the Roman writers wrote during a time when the Roman republican ideal was fading away, its forms but not its spirit or substance being preserved in the Roman Empire, the 18th-century American and French revolutionaries read them with a spirit to determine how the Roman republic failed, and how to avoid repeating that failure. In his Reflections on the Rise and Fall of the Antient Republicks, the English Whig historian Edward Wortley Montagu sought to describe "the principal causes of that degeneracy of manners, which reduc'd those once brave and free people into the most abject slavery." Following this reading of Roman ideals, the American revolutionary Charles Lee envisioned a Spartan, egalitarian society where every man was a soldier and master of his own land, and where people were "instructed from early infancy to deem themselves property of the State.…(and) were ever ready to sacrifice their concerns to her interests." The agrarianism of Thomas Jefferson represents a similar belief system; Jefferson believed that the ideal republic was composed of independent, rural agriculturalists rather than urban tradesmen.

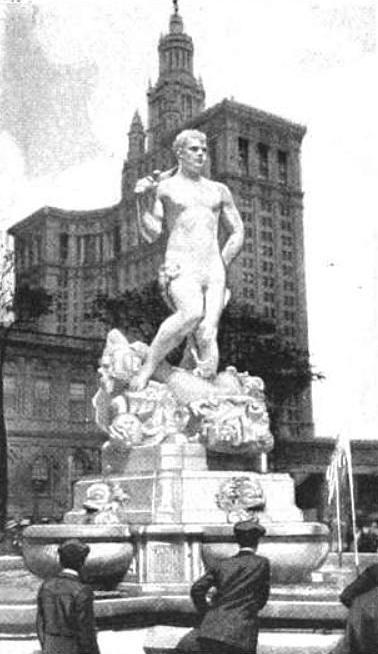
Civic Virtue, 1919

These widely held ideals led American revolutionaries to found institutions such as the Society of the Cincinnati, named after the Roman farmer and dictator Lucius Quinctius Cincinnatus, who according to Livy left his farm to lead the army of the Roman republic during a crisis, and voluntarily returned to his plow once the crisis had passed. About Cincinnatus, Livy writes:

Operae pretium est audire qui omnia prae diuitiis humana spernunt neque honori magno locum neque uirtuti putant esse, nisi ubi effuse afluant opes ....
(It is worthwhile for those who disdain all human things for money, and who suppose that there is no room either for great honor or virtue, except where wealth is found, to listen to his story.)

— Livy, Ab Urbe Condita, book III.

=== 19th to mid-20th century ===
Civic virtues were especially important during the 19th and 20th century. Class and profession greatly affected the virtues of the individual, and there was a general division about what the best civic virtues were. Additionally several major ideologies came into being, each with their own ideas about civic virtues.

Conservatism emphasized family values and obedience to the father and the state. Nationalism carried by masses of people made patriotism an important civic virtue. Liberalism combined republicanism with a belief in progress and liberalization based on capitalism. Civic virtues focused on individual behavior and responsibility were very important. Many liberals turned into socialists or conservatives in the end of the 19th century and early 20th century. Others became social liberals, valuing capitalism with a strong government to protect the poor. A focus on agriculture and landed nobility was supplanted by a focus on industry and civil society.

=== In later times ===
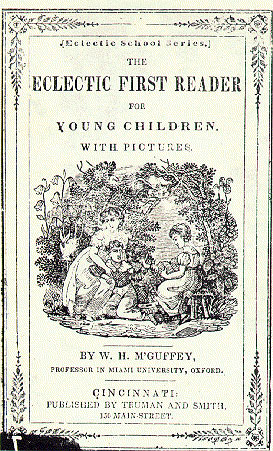
The cover of an Eclectic First Reader book.

A number of institutions and organizations promote the idea of civic virtue in the older democracies. Among such organizations are the Boy Scouts of America, and Civil Air Patrol whose U.S. oath, Cadet Oath and Cadet Honor Code reflect a goal to foster habits aimed at serving a larger community:

Boy Scouts of America Scout Oath:

On my honor I will do my best
To do my duty to God and my country
and to obey the Scout Law;
To help other people at all times;
To keep myself physically strong,
mentally awake, and morally straight.

Boy Scouts of America Scout Law:

A Scout is Trustworthy, Loyal, Helpful, Friendly, Courteous, Kind, Obedient, Cheerful, Thrifty, Brave, Clean, and Reverent.

Cadet Oath:

I pledge that I will serve faithfully in the Civil Air Patrol Cadet Program, and that I will attend meetings regularly, participate actively in unit activities, obey my officers, wear my uniform properly, and advance my education and training rapidly to prepare myself to be of service to my community, state and nation.

Air Force Academy Cadet Honor Code:

We will not lie, steal, or cheat, nor tolerate among us anyone who does. Furthermore, I resolve to do my duty and live honorably (so help me God).

Institutions that might be said to encourage civic virtue include the school, particularly with social studies courses, and the prison, namely in its rehabilitative function.

Other, later phenomena associated with the concept of civic virtue include McGuffey's Eclectic Readers, a series of primary school textbooks whose compiler, William Holmes McGuffey, deliberately sought out patriotic and religious sentiments to instill these values in the children who read them. William Bennett, a Reagan administration cabinet member turned conservative commentator, produced The Book of Virtues: A Treasury of Great Moral Stories in 1993, another anthology of literary materials that might be considered an attempt to update McGuffey's concept.

== Comparable ideas in non-Western societies ==
Confucianism, which specifies cultural virtues and traditions which all members of society are to observe, in particular the heads of households and those who govern, was the basis of Chinese society for more than 2000 years and is still influential in modern China. Its related concepts can be compared to the Western idea of civic virtue.

== Related concepts ==
Friendliness
Friendliness is a pro-social set of behaviors seen in people who are pleasant, agreeable, interested in others, genial, empathetic, considerate, and helpful. Not all civil behaviors are friendly. For example, duelling in response to an intolerable insult has been considered a civil behavior in many cultures, but it is not a friendly action.
Politeness
Politeness focuses on the application of good manners or etiquette. Because politeness is informed by cultural values, there is substantial overlap between what is polite and what is civil. However, if the action in question is not related to civic virtues, then it may be polite or rude, without strictly being considered civil or incivil.
Social graces
The social graces include deportment, poise, and fashion, which are unrelated to civility.
Incivility
Incivility is a general term for social behavior lacking in civic virtue or good manners, on a scale from rudeness or lack of respect for elders, to vandalism and hooliganism, through public drunkenness and threatening behavior. The word incivility is derived from the Latin incivilis, meaning "not of a citizen."
The distinction between plain rudeness, and perceived incivility as threat, will depend on some notion of "civility" as structural to society; incivility as anything more ominous than bad manners is therefore dependent on appeal to notions like its antagonism to the complex concepts of civic virtue or civil society. It has become a contemporary political issue in a number of countries.

== See also ==
- Arete
- Civic engagement
- Civic nationalism
- Civic virtue (organizational citizenship behavior dimension), specific to organizational behavior theory
- Civil disobedience
- Civil religion
- Classical republicanism
- Commonwealth men
- Courtesy
- "England expects that every man will do his duty"
- Good citizenship
- Public good
- Republicanism
- Theological virtues
- Virtus

== Bibliography ==
- Hale, John (1993). The Civilization of Europe in the Renaissance. London. ISBN 0002153394.
- Daniel Roche. La France des Lumières (Paris 1993).
- Parker, Harold T. The Cult of Antiquity and the French Revolutionaries (Univ. Chicago, 1937).
- Wood, Gordon S. The Creation of the American Republic, 1776–1787 (Univ. North Carolina Press 1969, repr. Horton 1975). ISBN 0-393-00644-1.
- Peggy Noonan (2008). Patriotic Grace.d
- Stephen L. Carter. Integrity.
