= Sakharov Prize =

European award for human rights

Sakharov Prize for Freedom and Thought
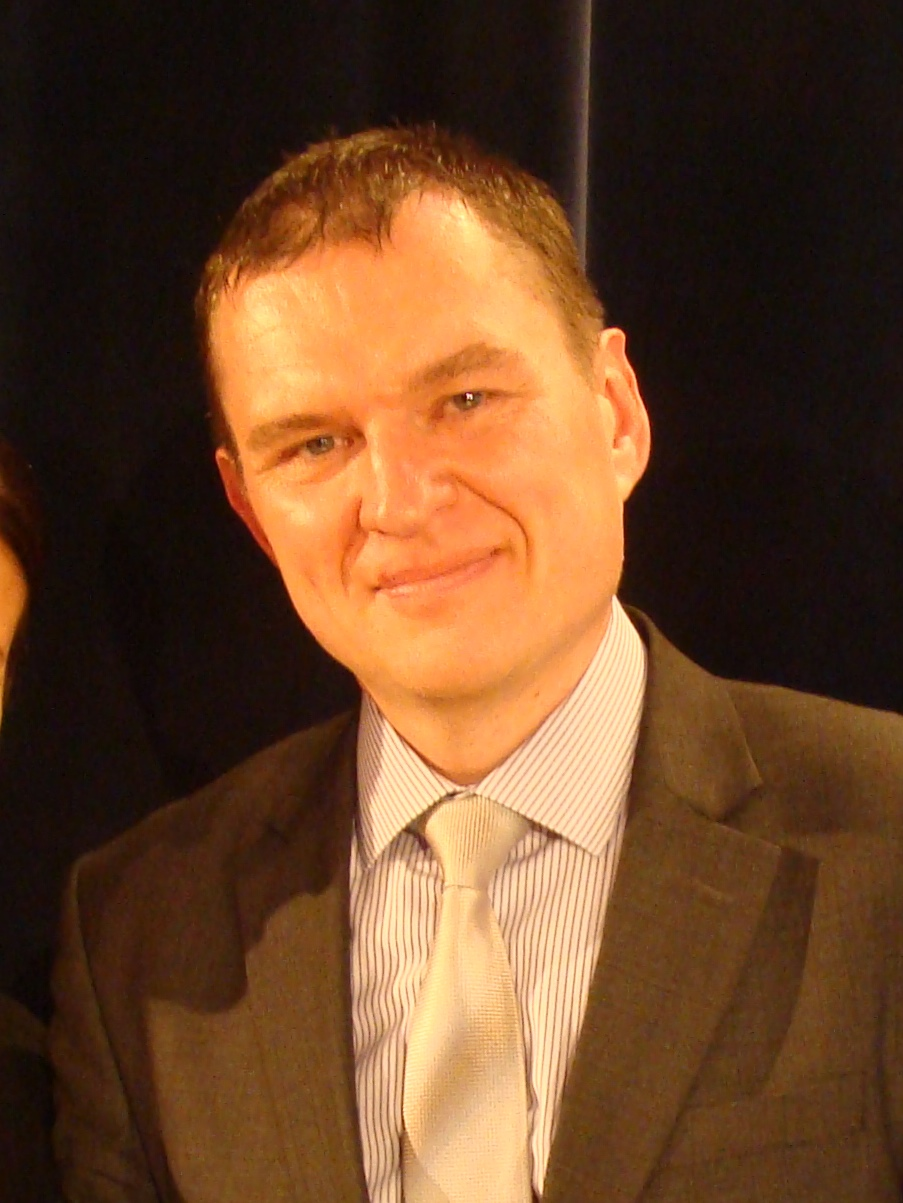
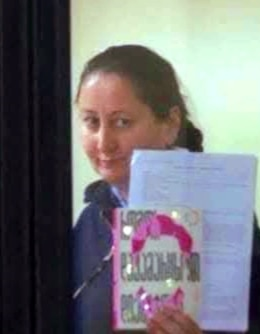
- The 2025 Sakharov Prize diploma was awarded to Andrzej Poczobut from Belarus and Mzia Amaglobeli representing the Georgian pro-democracy protest movement.
- Awarded for: Recognising individuals, groups and organisations that have made an outstanding contribution to protecting freedom of thought.
- Presented by: European Parliament
- Rewards: A diploma and a monetary award of €50,000
- First award: December 1988; 37 years ago
- Website: Official website

The Sakharov Prize for Freedom of Thought, commonly known as the Sakharov Prize, is an honorary award for individuals or groups who have dedicated their lives to the defence of human rights and freedom of thought. Named after Russian scientist and dissident Andrei Sakharov, the prize was established in December 1988 by the European Parliament.

A shortlist of nominees is drawn up annually by the European Parliament's Committee on Foreign Affairs and Committee on Development. The MEPs who make up those committees then select a shortlist in September. Thereafter, the final choice is given to The European Parliament's Conference of Presidents (President and political group's leaders) and the laureate's name is announced late in October. The prize is awarded in a ceremony at the Parliament's Strasbourg hemicycle (round chamber) in December. The prize includes a monetary award of €50,000.

The first prize was awarded jointly to South African Nelson Mandela and Russian Anatoly Marchenko. The 1990 award was given to Aung San Suu Kyi, but she could not receive it until 2013 as a result of her political imprisonment in Burma. The prize has also been awarded to organisations, the first being the Argentine Mothers of the Plaza de Mayo in 1992. Seven Sakharov laureates were subsequently awarded the Nobel Peace Prize: Aung San Suu Kyi (1991), Nelson Mandela (1993), Malala Yousafzai (2014), Denis Mukwege (2018), Nadia Murad (2018), Memorial (2022) and María Corina Machado (2025).

Razan Zaitouneh (2011) was kidnapped in 2013 and is still missing. Nasrin Sotoudeh (2012) was released from prison in September 2013, but is still barred from leaving Iran, along with fellow 2012 laureate Jafar Panahi. The 2017 prize was awarded to the Democratic Opposition in Venezuela, under boycott of the European United Left–Nordic Green Left.

As of 2024, the prize has been awarded to 51 recipients: 39 individuals (with 3 posthumously given) and 12 organisations.

== Laureates and nominees ==
Year	Award	Nominees	Country/ Headquarters	Nominators
1988	Laureate	Nelson Mandela (1918–2013); Anatoly Marchenko (1938–1986)	South Africa; Soviet Union	
1988	Finalists			
1988	Finalists	Roald Zelichenok (1936–2024)	Soviet Union	
1988	Longlists			
1988	Longlists	Larisa Bogoraz (1929–2004)	Soviet Union	
1988	Longlists	International Human Rights Association (founded in ?)	Switzerland	
1988	Longlists	Natan Sharansky (born 1948)	Israel	
1988	Longlists	Mordechai Vanunu (born 1954)	Israel	
1989	Laureate	Alexander Dubček (1921–1992)	Czechoslovakia	European Liberal Democrat and Reform Party and Luigi Alberto Colajanni and other MEPs
1989	Finalists			
1989	Finalists	Doina Cornea (1929–2018)	Romania	Greens–European Free Alliance and Christopher Prout and other MEPs
1989	Finalists	Gyula Horn (1932–2013)	Hungary	Progressive Alliance of Socialists and Democrats and European People's Party
1989	Longlists			
1989	Longlists	Tadeusz Mazowiecki (1927–2013)	Poland	Anne McIntosh and other MEPs
1989	Longlists	Chico Mendes (1944–1988)	Brazil	The Left in the European Parliament
1990	Laureate	Aung San Suu Kyi (born 1945) (Note: At the time she received the award, Suu Kyi was an opposition politician and a former General Secretary of the National League for Democracy, known for her peaceful struggle against military rule in Myanmar. She personally accepted the award in 2013, after she was released from 15 years of house arrest. In 2020, the Conference of Presidents of the European Parliament formally suspended Suu Kyi from the Sakharov Prize Community due to her role in the atrocities against the Rohingya people, but did not revoke the prize itself.)	Myanmar	European Liberal Democrat and Reform Party
1990	Finalists			
1990	Finalists	László Tőkés (born 1952)	Hungary	European People's Party
1990	Finalists	Fang Lizhi (1936–2012)	China	The Left in the European Parliament
1990	Longlists			
1990	Longlists	Universidad Católica de El Salvador (founded in 1982)	El Salvador	Rosy Bindi and other MEPs
1990	Longlists	Ibrahim Rugova (1944–2006)	Yugoslavia	Greens–European Free Alliance
1990	Longlists	Adem Demaçi (1936–2018) (Note: The nominations of Adem Demaçi, Chico Mendes and Aziz Nesin in 1990 were eventually removed because it were received after the deadline.)	Yugoslavia	Jaak Vandemeulebroucke and other MEPs
1990	Longlists	Chico Mendes (1944–1988)	Brazil	Left Unity Group
1990	Longlists	Aziz Nesin (1915–1995)	Turkey	Left Unity Group
1991	Laureate	Adem Demaçi (1936–2016)	Yugoslavia	European Liberal Democrat and Reform Party, Greens–European Free Alliance, European People's Party, and Alexander Langer and other MEPs
1991	Finalists			
1991	Finalists	László Tőkés (born 1952)	Hungary	European People's Party
1991	Finalists	Terry Waite (born 1939)	United Kingdom	Progressive Alliance of Socialists and Democrats
1991	Longlists			
1991	Longlists	Mikhail Gorbachev (1931–2022); Boris Yeltsin (1931–2006)	Soviet Union	The Left in the European Parliament
1991	Longlists	Nancy Gracey (?-2025)	United Kingdom	CG Group
1991	Longlists	Eduard Shevardnadze (1928–2014)	Georgia	European Liberal Democrat and Reform Party
1991	Longlists	Wei Jingsheng (born 1950)	China	European Democratic Party
1992	Laureate	Mothers of the Plaza de Mayo (founded in 1977)	Argentina	
1992	Finalists			
1992	Finalists	Alija Izetbegović (1925–2003)	Bosnia-Herzegovina	
1992	Finalists	María Elena Cruz Varela (born 1953)	Cuba	
1992	Longlists			
1992	Longlists	Cuban Commission for Human Rights and National Reconciliation (founded in 1987)	Cuba	
1992	Longlists	Giovanni Falcone (1939–1992); Paolo Borsellino (1940–1992)	Italy	
1992	Longlists	Rigoberta Menchú (born 1959)	Guatemala	
1993	Laureate	Oslobođenje (founded in 1943)	Bosnia-Herzegovina	
1993	Finalists			
1993	Finalists	Xanana Gusmão (born 1946)	East Timor	
1993	Finalists	Gendün Rinchen (1926–1997)	Bhutan	
1993	Longlists			
1993	Longlists	Cedric Mayson (1927–2015)	South Africa	
1993	Longlists	Volmer do Nascimento (?–1991)	Brazil	
1993	Longlists	Salman Rushdie (born 1947)	United Kingdom	
1994	Laureate	Taslima Nasrin (born 1962)	Bangladesh	
1994	Finalists			
1994	Finalists	Sebastian Arcos Bergnes (1931–1997)	Cuba	
1994	Finalists	Leyla Zana (born 1961) (Note: On 12 October 1994, the Committee on Foreign Affairs had decided to only submit nominations of individuals to the Conference of Presidents. Hence, rather than submitting a joint nomination of Mr. and Mrs. Zana, only the nomination of Leyla Zana would be submitted.)	Turkey	
1994	Longlists			
1994	Longlists	Xanana Gusmão (born 1946)	East Timor	
1994	Longlists	Samuel Ruiz (1924–2011)	Mexico	
1994	Longlists	Wei Jingsheng (born 1950)	China	
1994	Longlists	Mehdi Zana (born 1940)	Turkey	
1995	Laureate	Leyla Zana (born 1961)	Turkey	
1995	Finalists			
1995	Finalists	Sergei Kovalev (1930–2021)	Russia	
1995	Finalists	Naguib Mahfouz (1911–2006)	Egypt	
1995	Longlists			
1995	Longlists	Comunità San Patrignano (founded in 1978)	Italy	
1995	Longlists	Community of Sant'Egidio (founded in 1968)	Italy	
1995	Longlists	Palden Gyatso (1933–2018)	China	
1995	Longlists	Ken Saro-Wiwa (1941–1995)	Nigeria	
1996	Laureate	Wei Jingsheng (born 1950)	China	
1996	Finalists			
1996	Finalists	Samuel Ruiz (1924–2011)	Mexico	
1996	Finalists	Leonel Morejón Almagro (born ?)	Cuba	
1996	Longlists			
1996	Longlists	Silvia Baraldini (born 1947)	Italy	
1996	Longlists	Aleksandr Nikitin (born 1952)	Russia	
1997	Laureate	Salima Ghezali (born 1958)	Algeria	
1997	Finalists			
1997	Finalists	Franjo Komarica (born 1946)	Bosnia-Herzegovina	
1997	Finalists	Eleni Foka (born 1950)	Cyprus	
1997	Longlists			
1997	Longlists	Elizardo Sánchez (born 1944)	Cuba	
1998	Laureate	Ibrahim Rugova (1944–2006)	Yugoslavia	
1998	Finalists			
1998	Finalists	Akın Birdal (born 1948)	Turkey	
1998	Finalists	Ukshin Hoti (1942–1999)	Kosovo	
1998	Longlists			
1998	Longlists	ACCEPT (founded in 1996)	Romania	
1998	Longlists	14th Dalai Lama (born 1935)	China	
1998	Longlists	José Rainha Júnior (born 1960)	Brazil	
1998	Longlists	Marta Beatriz Roque (born 1945)	Cuba	
1998	Longlists	Mordechai Vanunu (born 1954)	Israel	
1999	Laureate	Xanana Gusmão (born 1946)	East Timor	
1999	Finalists			
1999	Finalists	Angelina Atyam (born 1946)	Uganda	
1999	Finalists	Radio B 2-92 (founded in 1989)	Serbia	
1999	Longlists			
1999	Longlists	Akın Birdal (born 1948)	Turkey	
1999	Longlists	Khemaïs Ksila (born 1956)	Tunisia	
1999	Longlists	Martin Lee (born 1938)	Hong Kong	
2000	Laureate	¡Basta Ya! (founded in 1994)	Spain	Gerardo Galeote Quecedo and other MEPs
2000	Finalists			
2000	Finalists	Angelina Atyam (born 1946)	Uganda	
2000	Finalists	Andrei Babitsky (1964–2022)	Russia	
2000	Finalists	Ngawang Sangdrol (born 1977)	China	
2000	Longlists			
2000	Longlists	Mumia Abu-Jamal (born 1954)	United States	Mario Segni and other MEPs
2000	Longlists	Immaculée Birhaheka (born 1960)	DR Congo	
2000	Longlists	Radhia Nasraoui (born 1953)	Tunisia	
2000	Longlists	Aleksandr Nikitin (born 1952)	Russia	
2001	Laureate	Nurit Peled-Elhanan (born 1949); Izzat Ghazzawi (1951–2003)	Israel; Palestine	Francis Wurtz and other MEPs
2001	Laureate	Zacarias Kamwenho (1934–2026)	Angola	José Ribeiro e Castro and other MEPs
2001	Finalists			
2001	Finalists	Sihem Bensedrine (born 1950)	Tunisia	Harlem Désir and other MEPs
2001	Longlists			
2001	Longlists	Angelina Atyam (born 1946)	Uganda	Emma Nicholson and other MEPs
2001	Longlists	Francisco de Roux (born 1943)	Colombia	Antonio Di Pietro and other MEPs
2001	Longlists	Patrick Leahy (born 1940)	United States	Mario Segni and other MEPs
2001	Longlists	Li Hongzhi (born 1951)	China	Nelly Maes and other MEPs
2001	Longlists	Ngawang Sangdrol (born 1977)	China	Thomas Mann and other MEPs
2001	Longlists	Morgan Tsvangirai (1952–2018)	Zimbabwe	Johan Van Hecke and other MEPs
2002	Laureate	Oswaldo Payá (1952–2012)	Cuba	Graham Watson and 3 other MEPs
2002	Finalists			
2002	Finalists	Sihem Bensedrine (born 1950); Saad Eddin Ibrahim (1938–2023)	Tunisia; Egypt	Emma Bonino and 5 other MEPs
2002	Finalists	Morgan Tsvangirai (1952–2018)	Zimbabwe	Geoffrey Van Orden and 3 other MEPs
2002	Longlists			
2002	Longlists	Ahmad Shah Massoud (1953–2001)	Afghanistan	Union for Europe of the Nations
2002	Longlists	Grigory Pasko (born 1962)	Russia	Matti Wuori and 3 other MEPs
2002	Longlists	Kailash Satyarthi (born 1954)	India	Luigi Vinci and other MEPs
2003	Laureate	Kofi Annan (1938–2018); United Nations (founded in 1945)	Ghana; United Nations	European People's Party and Party of European Socialists
2003	Finalists			
2003	Finalists	Akbar Ganji (born 1960)	Iran	Greens–European Free Alliance
2003	Finalists	Sérgio Vieira de Mello (1948–2003)	Brazil	European Liberal Democrat and Reform Party, The Left in the European Parliament, Union for Europe of the Nations and José Ribeiro e Castro and other MEPs
2003	Finalists	Hans Blix (born 1928); Mohamed ElBaradei (born 1942)	Sweden; Egypt	The Left in the European Parliament
2003	Longlists			
2003	Longlists	Saim Balmukhanov (1922–?)	Kazakhstan	Struan Stevenson and other MEPs
2003	Longlists	Yury Bandazhevsky (born 1957)	Belarus	Marie Anne Isler Béguin and other MEPs
2003	Longlists	Central Asian opposition leaders and campaigners of democracy: Felix Kulov (born 1948); Muhammed Bekzhon (born ?); Batyr Berdiýew (born 1960); Galymzhan Zhakiyanov (born 1963)	Kyrgyzstan; Uzbekistan; Turkmenistan; Kazakhstan	Matti Wuori and other MEPs
2004	Laureate	Belarusian Association of Journalists (founded in 1995)	Belarus	Michael Gahler and other MEPs
2004	Finalists			
2004	Finalists	Natalya Estemirova (1958–2009)	Russia	Greens–European Free Alliance
2004	Finalists	Sergei Kovalev (1930–2021)	Russia	Vytautas Landsbergis and other MEPs
2004	Finalists	Íngrid Betancourt (born 1961)	Colombia	Party of European Socialists
2004	Longlists			
2004	Longlists	Reporters Without Borders (born 1985)	France	Alliance of Liberals and Democrats for Europe
2004	Longlists	Enzo Baldoni (1948–2004); Rachel Corrie (1979–2003); Leonid Roshal (born 1933)	Italy; United States; Russia	The Left in the European Parliament
2004	Longlists	Alexander Esenin-Volpin (1924–2016)	Russia	Independence/Democracy
2004	Longlists	Angelica Edna Calo Livne (born 1955)	Italy	Mario Mauro and other MEPs
2004	Longlists	Václav Havel (1936–2011)	Czechoslovakia	Jana Bobošíková and other MEPs
2004	Longlists	Ibrahim Hussain Zaki (born 1947)	Maldives	Nirj Deva and other MEPs
2004	Longlists	Zubr (founded in 2001)	Belarus	Rolandas Pavilionis and other MEPs
2005	Laureate	Ladies in White (founded in 2003)	Cuba	Gerardo Galeote Quecedo and other MEPs
2005	Laureate	Reporters Without Borders (founded in 1989)	France	Alliance of Liberals and Democrats for Europe
2005	Laureate	Hauwa Ibrahim (born 1989)	Nigeria	Party of European Socialists
2005	Longlists			
2005	Longlists	Yang Zili (born 1971); Mojtaba Saminejad (born 1980); Zouhair Yahyaoui (1967–2005)	China; Iran; Tunisia	Greens–European Free Alliance
2005	Longlists	Mukhtar Mai (born 1972)	Pakistan	The Left in the European Parliament
2005	Longlists	Gunārs Astra (1931–1988)	Latvia	Union for Europe of the Nations
2005	Longlists	Alexander Esenin-Volpin (1924–2016); Sergei Kovalev (1930–2021)	Russia	Independence/Democracy
2005	Longlists	Mudawi Ibrahim Adam (born 1956)	Sudan	Simon Coveney and other MEPs
2005	Longlists	Daniel Barenboim (born 1942); West–Eastern Divan Orchestra (founded in 1999)	Germany; Spain	Erna Hennicot-Schoepges and other MEPs
2005	Longlists	Aminatou Haidar (born 1966)	Western Sahara	Karin Scheele and other MEPs
2006	Laureate	Alaksandar Milinkievič (1947–2026)	Belarus	Union for Europe of the Nations and European People's Party
2006	Finalists			
2006	Finalists	The Colombians fighting for kidnapped hostages	Colombia	Greens–European Free Alliance
2006	Finalists	Ghassan Tueni (1926–2012) (Note: Tueni was nominated in memory of five prominent Lebanese people who were assassinated in 2005: Gebran Tueni (1957–2005), Rafic Hariri (1944–2005), Bassel Fleihan (1963–2005), Samir Kassir (1960–2005) and George Hawi (1938–2005).)	Lebanon	The Left in the European Parliament and Party of European Socialists
2006	Longlists			
2006	Longlists	Íngrid Betancourt (born 1961)	Colombia	Marie-Arlette Carlotti and other MEPs
2006	Longlists	Fulda-Moscho-Project (founded in 2002); Muthgard Hinkelmann-Toewe (1940–2026)	Germany; Kenya	Alexander Nuno Alvaro and other MEPs
2006	Longlists	Vladimir Kozlov (born 1960)	Kazakhstan	Toomas Hendrik Ilves and other MEPs
2006	Longlists	Erwin Kräutler (born 1939)	Austria	Herbert Bösch (born 1954) and other MEPs
2006	Longlists	Somaly Mam (born 1970)	Cambodia	Alliance of Liberals and Democrats for Europe
2006	Longlists	Mesfin Woldemariam (1930–2020)	Ethiopia	Ana Maria Gomes and other MEPs
2006	Longlists	Women in Black (founded in 1991)	Serbia	Jelko Kacin and other MEPs
2007	Laureate	Salih Mahmoud Osman (born 1957)	Sudan	Alliance of Liberals and Democrats for Europe and Josep Borrell and 181 other MEPs
2007	Finalists			
2007	Finalists	Anna Politkovskaya (1958–2006)	Russia	European People's Party
2007	Finalists	Hu Jia (born 1973); Zeng Jinyan (born 1983)	China	Greens–European Free Alliance
2007	Longlists			
2007	Longlists	Patriarch Bartholomew I (born 1940) (Note: Bartholomew I's nomination was subsequently removed from the list after the Patriarch told the Parliament he would not accept it.)	Turkey	Identity, Tradition, Sovereignty
2007	Longlists	Malalai Joya (born 1978)	Afghanistan	The Left in the European Parliament
2008	Laureate	Hu Jia (born 1973)	China	Alliance of Liberals and Democrats for Europe, and Greens–European Free Alliance
2008	Finalists			
2008	Finalists	Alyaksandr Kazulin (born 1955)	Belarus	Jacek Protasiewicz and 45 other MEPs
2008	Finalists	Apollinaire Malu Malu (1961–2016)	DR Congo	Luisa Morgantini and 47 other MEPs
2008	Longlists			
2008	Longlists	Íngrid Betancourt (born 1961)	Colombia	Party of European Socialists
2008	Longlists	14th Dalai Lama (born 1935)	China	Union for Europe of the Nations and Piia-Noora Kauppi and 40 other MEPs
2008	Longlists	Morgan Tsvangirai (1958–2018)	Zimbabwe	Luís Queiró and 96 other MEPs
2008	Longlists	European Roma Rights Centre (founded in 1996)	Hungary	The Left in the European Parliament
2008	Longlists	Mikhail Trepashkin (born 1957)	Russia	Independence/Democracy
2009	Laureate	Memorial (founded in 1989) and human rights defenders in Russia: Lyudmila Alexeyeva (1927–2018); Oleg Orlov (born 1953); Sergei Kovalev (1930–2021)	Russia	Greens–European Free Alliance and Jacek Saryusz-Wolski and 59 other MEPs
2009	Finalists			
2009	Finalists	Izzeldin Abuelaish (born 1955)	Palestine	Véronique De Keyser and 54 other MEPs
2009	Finalists	Dawit Isaak (born 1964)	Eritrea; Sweden	The Left in the European Parliament and Olle Schmidt and 31 other MEPs
2009	Longlists			
2009	Longlists	Fundación Vicente Ferrer (founded in 1996)	Spain	Juan Andrés Perelló and 39 other MEPs
2009	Longlists	Mariam Lamizana (born 1951)	Burkina Faso	Europe of Freedom and Democracy
2009	Longlists	Denis Mukwege (born 1955)	DR Congo	Alliance of Liberals and Democrats for Europe
2009	Longlists	Thadeus Nguyễn Văn Lý (born 1946)	Vietnam	Michael Gahler and 44 other MEPs
2009	Longlists	Shadi Sadr (born 1974); Neda Agha-Soltan (1983–2009); Iranian citizens and activists	Iran	Marietje Schaake and 39 other MEPs
2009	Longlists	Roberto Saviano (born 1979)	Italy	Sonia Alfano and 39 other MEPs
2010	Laureate	Guillermo Fariñas (born 1962) (Note: On 15 December 2010, the prize was awarded to Guillermo Fariñas. However, the Cuban authorities did not allow the laureate to come to Strasbourg, despite the requests of Jerzy Buzek, President of the European Parliament. The latter therefore placed the diploma on an empty chair, covered with a Cuban flag at the dissident's request.)	Cuba	European Conservatives and Reformists Group, European People's Party, and Edvard Kožušník and 91 other MEPs
2010	Finalists			
2010	Finalists	Breaking the Silence (founded in 2004)	Israel	The Left in the European Parliament and Greens–European Free Alliance
2010	Finalists	Birtukan Mideksa (born 1974)	Ethiopia	Progressive Alliance of Socialists and Democrats
2010	Longlists			
2010	Longlists	"Access" (founded in ?)		Alliance of Liberals and Democrats for Europe
2010	Longlists	Haitham al-Maleh (born 1931)	Syria	Heidi Hautala and 44 other MEPs
2010	Longlists	Aminatou Haidar (born 1966)	Western Sahara	Norbert Neuser and 42 other MEPs
2010	Longlists	Dawit Isaak (born 1964)	Eritrea; Sweden	Olle Schmidt and 40 other MEPs
2010	Longlists	Thadeus Nguyễn Văn Lý (born 1946)	Vietnam	European Conservatives and Reformists Group
2010	Longlists	Open Doors (founded in 1955)	Netherlands	European Conservatives and Reformists Group
2011	Laureate	Five Arab spring activists: Asmaa Mahfouz (born 1985); Ahmed al-Senussi (born 1933); Razan Zaitouneh (born 1977); Ali Farzat (born 1951); Mohamed Bouazizi (1984–2011)	Egypt; Libya; Syria; Tunisia	Alliance of Liberals and Democrats for Europe, Progressive Alliance of Socialists and Democrats, Greens–European Free Alliance and European People's Party
2011	Finalists			
2011	Finalists	Dzmitry Bandarenka (born 1963)	Belarus	European Conservatives and Reformists Group
2011	Finalists	San José de Apartadó Peace Community (founded in 1997)	Colombia	The Left in the European Parliament
2011	Longlists	Izzeldin Abuelaish (born 1955)	Palestine	European Conservatives and Reformists Group
2011	Longlists	Boris Pahor (1913–2022)	Slovenia	Milan Zver and 51 other MEPs
2012	Laureate	Nasrin Sotoudeh (born 1963); Jafar Panahi (born 1960)	Iran	Progressive Alliance of Socialists and Democrats, Alliance of Liberals and Democrats for Europe, Greens–European Free Alliance and Elmar Brok and 38 other MEPs
2012	Finalists			
2012	Finalists	Ales Bialatski (born 1962)	Belarus	Jacek Saryusz-Wolski and 82 other MEPs
2012	Finalists	Pussy Riot (founded in 2011)	Russia	Werner Schulz and 45 other MEPs
2012	Longlists			
2012	Longlists	Rwanda political prisoners represented by: Victoire Ingabire Umuhoza (born 1968); Déogratias Mushayid (born 1961); Bernard Ntaganda(born 1967)	Rwanda	Willy Meyer Pleite and 41 other MEPs
2012	Longlists	Joseph Francis (born ?)	Pakistan	European Conservatives and Reformists Group
2013	Laureate	Malala Yousafzai (born 1997)	Pakistan	Progressive Alliance of Socialists and Democrats, Alliance of Liberals and Democrats for Europe, European Conservatives and Reformists Group, and European People's Party
2013	Finalists			
2013	Finalists	Belarusian political prisoners represented by: Ales Bialatski (born 1962); Eduard Lobau (1988–2023); Mikola Statkevich (born 1956)	Belarus	Marek Migalski and 41 other MEPs
2013	Finalists	Edward Snowden (born 1983)	United States; Russia	The Left in the European Parliament and Greens–European Free Alliance
2013	Longlists			
2013	Longlists	Reeyot Alemu (born 1980); Eskinder Nega (born 1969)	Ethiopia	Ana Maria Gomes and 40 other MEPs
2013	Longlists	Mikhail Khodorkovsky (born 1963)	Russia	Werner Schulz and 40 other MEPs
2013	Longlists	"Standing Man" protesters	Turkey	Marietje Schaake and 40 other MEPs
2013	Longlists	CNN Freedom Project (founded in 2011)	United States	Boris Zala and 40 other MEPs
2014	Laureate	Denis Mukwege (born 1955)	DR Congo	Progressive Alliance of Socialists and Democrats and Alliance of Liberals and Democrats for Europe
2014	Finalists			
2014	Finalists	Leyla Yunus (born 1955)	Azerbaijan	Greens–European Free Alliance
2014	Finalists	EuroMaidan represented by: Mustafa Nayyem (born 1981); Ruslana Lyzhychko (born 1973); Yelyzaveta Schepetylnykova (born ?); Tetiana Chornovol (born 1979)	Ukraine	Jacek Saryusz-Wolski and 52 other MEPs
2014	Longlists			
2014	Longlists	Mahmoud Al 'Asali (?–2014); Louis Raphaël I Sako (born 1948)	Iraq	European Conservatives and Reformists Group; Anna Záborská and 66 other MEPs
2014	Longlists	Organisations for the protection of Christian minorities: Coordination of the Christians of East in Danger (CHREDO) (founded in 2013); Open Doors (founded in 1955); Oeuvre d'Orient (founded in 1856); Aid to the Church in Need (born 1947)	Netherlands; Belgium; Germany	Philippe Juvin and 60 other MEPs
2014	Longlists	Ayaan Hirsi Ali (born 1969)	Somalia; United States	Europe of Freedom and Direct Democracy
2015	Laureate	Raif Badawi (born 1984)	Saudi Arabia	Progressive Alliance of Socialists and Democrats, European Conservatives and Reformists Group, and Greens–European Free Alliance
2015	Finalists			
2015	Finalists	Boris Nemtsov (1959–2015)	Russia	Alliance of Liberals and Democrats for Europe
2015	Finalists	Venezuelan opposition and political prisoners	Venezuela	European People's Party
2015	Longlist			
2015	Longlist	Edna Adan Ismail (born 1937)	Somalia	Europe of Freedom and Direct Democracy
2015	Longlist	Nadiya Savchenko (born 1981)	Ukraine	European Conservatives and Reformists Group
2015	Longlist	Edward Snowden (born 1983); Antoine Deltour (born 1985); Stéphanie Gibaud (born 1965)	United States; Russia; France	The Left in the European Parliament
2016	Laureate	Nadia Murad (born 1993); Lamiya Haji Bashar (born 1998)	Iraq	Alliance of Liberals and Democrats for Europe and Progressive Alliance of Socialists and Democrats
2016	Finalists			
2016	Finalists	Can Dündar (born 1961)	Turkey	Europe of Freedom and Direct Democracy, The Left in the European Parliament, and Greens–European Free Alliance
2016	Finalists	Mustafa Dzhemilev (born 1943)	Ukraine	European Conservatives and Reformists Group and European People's Party Group
2016	Longlists			
2016	Longlists	Ilham Tohti (born 1969)	China	Ilhan Kyuchyuk and 42 other MEPs
2017	Laureate	Democratic opposition in Venezuela represented by National Assembly and all political prisoners: Julio Borges (born 1969); Leopoldo López (born 1971); Antonio Ledezma (born 1955); Daniel Ceballos (born 1984); Yon Goicoechea (born 1984); Lorent Saleh (born 1988); Alfredo Ramos (born 1955); Andrea González (born ?)	Venezuela	Alliance of Liberals and Democrats for Europe and European People's Party
2017	Finalists			
2017	Finalists	Aura Lolita Chavez Ixcaquic (born 1972)	Guatemala	Greens–European Free Alliance
2017	Finalists	Dawit Isaak (born 1964)	Eritrea; Sweden	Progressive Alliance of Socialists and Democrats; Cecilia Wikström and 46 other MEPs
2017	Longlists			
2017	Longlists	Asia Bibi (born 1971)	Pakistan	European Conservatives and Reformists Group
2017	Longlists	Selahattin Demirtaş (born 1973); Figen Yüksekdağ (born 1971)	Turkey	The Left in the European Parliament
2017	Longlists	Pierre Claver Mbonimpa (born 1950)	Burundi	Europe of Freedom and Direct Democracy
2018	Laureate	Oleg Sentsov (born 1976)	Ukraine	European People's Party
2018	Finalists			
2018	Finalists	Nasser Zefzafi (born 1979)	Morocco	The Left in the European Parliament
2018	Finalists	NGOs protecting human rights and saving migrant lives across the Mediterranean Sea: Boat Refugee Foundation (founded in 2015); Jugend Rettet (founded in 2015); Lifeline Rescue Boat (founded in 2016); Médecins Sans Frontières (founded in 1971); Migrant Offshore Aid Station (founded in 2013); Proactiva Open Arms (founded in 2015); Proem-Aid (founded in 2015); Save the Children (founded in 1919); Sea-Eye (founded in 2015); Sea-Watch (founded in 2015); SOS Méditerranée (founded in 2015)	Germany; France; Malta; Netherlands; Spain; United Kingdom	Progressive Alliance of Socialists and Democrats and Greens–European Free Alliance
2018	Longlists			
2018	Longlists	Seyran Ateş (born 1963)	Germany	European Conservatives and Reformists Group
2018	Longlists	"Caesar", Syrian military photographer (born ?)	Syria	Alliance of Liberals and Democrats for Europe
2018	Longlists	Dewayne "Lee" Johnson (born 1972)	United States	Europe of Freedom and Direct Democracy
2018	Longlists	AfriForum (founded in 2006)	South Africa	Europe of Nations and Freedom
2018	Longlists	Mary Wagner (born 1974)	Canada	Marek Jurek and 41 other MEPs
2019	Laureate	Ilham Tohti (born 1969)	China	Renew Europe
2019	Finalists			
2019	Finalists	Marielle Franco (1979–2018); Claudelice Silva dos Santos (born 1982); Raoni Metuktire (born 1932)	Brazil	Progressive Alliance of Socialists and Democrats and The Left in the European Parliament
2019	Finalists	The Restorers (founded in 2017)	Kenya	European Conservatives and Reformists Group
2019	Longlist			
2019	Longlist	Jean Wyllys (born 1974) (nominated jointly with M. Franco)	Brazil	Greens–European Free Alliance
2019	Longlist	Alexei Navalny (1976–2024)	Russia	European People's Party
2020 (Note: Due to infection control measures taken because of the COVID-19 pandemic, a number of events related to the Sakharov Community were postponed in 2020, including the Sakharov Fellowship, One World in Brussels and the European Youth Event.)	Laureate	Democratic opposition in Belarus represented by Coordination Council members: Sviatlana Tsikhanouskaya (born 1982); Sergei Tikhanovsky (born 1978); Svetlana Alexievich (born 1948); Maria Kalesnikava (born 1982); Olga Kovalkova (born 1984); Veranika Tsapkala (born 1976); Ales Bialiatski (born 1962); Sergei Dylevsky (born 1989); Stsiapan Putsila (born 1998); Mikola Statkevich (born 1956)	Belarus	European Conservatives and Reformists Group, Renew Europe, European People's Party and Progressive Alliance of Socialists and Democrats
2020	Finalists			
2020	Finalists	Berta Cáceres (1971–2016); Guapinol environmental activists: Porfirio Sorto Cedillo (born 1974); José Avelino Cedillo (born ?); Orbin Naún Hernández (born ?); Kevin Alejandro Romero (born ?); Arnold Javier Aleman (born ?); Ever Alexander Cedillo (born 1991); Daniel Marquez (born ?); Jeremías Martínez Díaz (born ?)	Honduras	Greens–European Free Alliance and The Left in the European Parliament
2020	Finalists	Najib Mikhael Moussa (born 1955)	Iraq	Identity and Democracy
2020	Longlists			
2020	Longlists	Polish LGBTI activists: Jakub Gawron (born ?); Paulina Pająk (born 1992); Paweł Preneta (born 1980); Kamil Maczuga (born 1993)	Poland	Malin Björk and 42 other MEPs
2021	Laureate	Alexei Navalny (1976–2024)	Russia	European People's Party and Renew Europe
2021	Finalists			
2021	Finalists	Jeanine Áñez (born 1967)	Bolivia	European Conservatives and Reformists Group
2021	Finalists	Afghan women and human rights activists: Shaharzad Akbar (born 1987); Mary Akrami (born 1975); Zarifa Ghafari (born 1994); Palwasha Hassan (born 1969); Freshta Karim (born 1992); Sahraa Karimi (born 1985); Metra Mehran (born ?); Horia Mosadiq (born 1973); Sima Samar (born 1957); Habiba Sarābi (born 1956); Anisa Shaheed (born 1986)	Afghanistan	Progressive Alliance of Socialists and Democrats and Greens–European Free Alliance
2021	Longlist			
2021	Longlist	Sultana Khaya (born 1980)	Western Sahara	The Left in the European Parliament
2021	Longlist	Global Witness (founded in 1993)	United Kingdom	Marie Toussaint and other 42 MEPs
2022	Laureate	The Ukrainian people represented by: President Volodymyr Zelenskyy (born 1978); elected leaders, and civil society	Ukraine	Progressive Alliance of Socialists and Democrats, European Conservatives and Reformists Group; European People's Party Group, and Renew Europe
2022	Finalists			
2022	Finalists	Julian Assange (born 1971)	Australia	Sabrina Pignedoli and 40 other MEPs
2022	Finalists	Colombia Truth Commission (founded in 2016)	Colombia	The Left in the European Parliament
2022	Longlists			
2022	Longlists	Sônia Guajajara (born 1974)	Brazil	Greens–European Free Alliance
2022	Longlists	Shireen Abu Akleh (1971–2022)	Palestine	Grace O'Sullivan and 42 other MEPs
2023	Laureate	Mahsa Jina Amini (1999–2022) and Woman, Life, Freedom movement (founded in 2022); Women in Iran	Iran	European People's Party, Renew Europe, and Progressive Alliance of Socialists and Democrats
2023	Finalists			
2023	Finalists	Vilma Núñez (born 1938); Rolando José Álvarez (born 1966)	Nicaragua	Tilly Metz and 42 other MEPs
2023	Finalists	Women fighting for free, safe and legal abortion: Justyna Wydrzyńska (born 1970); Morena Herrera (born 1960); Colleen McNicholas (born ?)	Poland; El Salvador; United States	The Left in the European Parliament
2023	Longlist			
2023	Longlist	Vanessa Nakate (born 1996)	Uganda	Greens–European Free Alliance
2023	Longlist	Elon Musk (born 1971)	United States	Identity and Democracy
2023	Longlist	Afghan education activists: Marzia Amiri (born ?); Parasto Hakim (born ?); Matiullah Wesa (born 1992–3)	Afghanistan	Petras Auštrevičius and 58 other MEPs
2023	Longlist	Pro-European people of Georgia; Nino Lomjaria (born 1984)	Georgia	European Conservatives and Reformists Group
2024	Laureate	María Corina Machado (born 1967); Edmundo González (born 1949)	Venezuela	European Conservatives and Reformists Group and European People's Party Group
2024	Finalists			
2024	Finalists	Gubad Ibadoghlu (born 1971)	Azerbaijan	Greens–European Free Alliance
2024	Finalists	Women Wage Peace (founded in 2014); Women of the Sun (founded in 2021)	Israel; Palestine	Renew Europe; Progressive Alliance of Socialists and Democrats
2024	Longlist			
2024	Longlist	Elon Musk (born 1971)	United States	Europe of Sovereign Nations Group and Patriots for Europe
2024	Longlist	Palestinian journalists in the Gaza Strip: Hamza Al-Dahdouh (1996–2024); Wael Al-Dahdouh (born 1970); Plestia Alaqad (born 2001); Shireen Abu Akleh (1971–2022); Ain Media in honour of Yaser Murtaja (1987–2018) and Roshdi Sarraj (1992–2023)	Palestine	The Left in the European Parliament
2025	Laureates	Andrzej Poczobut (1973–)	Belarus	European Conservatives and Reformists Group and European People's Party Group
2025	Laureates	Mzia Amaglobeli (1975–); Georgia's pro-democracy protest movement (founded in 2024)	Georgia	Rasa Juknevičienė and 60 other MEPs
2025	Finalists	Serbian Students	Serbia	Renew Europe
2025	Finalists	Journalists and humanitarian aid workers in conflict zones: Palestinian Press Association (founded in 1924); Palestine Red Crescent Society (founded in 1968); United Nations Relief and Works Agency (founded in 1949)	Palestine	Progressive Alliance of Socialists and Democrats
2025	Longlist	Boualem Sansal (Note: Boualem Sansal, through his representatives, stated that, while he holds the prize in high regard, he would not accept it if he was the laureate, as he considered the nomination by PfE an "insidious partisan move" that goes against his values.) (1949–)	Algeria	Patriots for Europe
2025	Longlist	Journalists in Palestine: Hamza Al-Dahdouh (1996–2024); Wael Al-Dahdouh (born 1970); Plestia Alaqad (born 2001); Shireen Abu Akleh (1971–2022); Ain Media in honour of Yaser Murtaja (1987–2018) and Roshdi Sarraj (1992–2023)	Palestine	The Left in the European Parliament
2025	Longlist	Budapest Pride (founded in 1997)	Hungary	Greens-European Free Alliance, Marc Angel, Kim van Sparrentak and 43 other MEPs
2025	Longlist	Charlie Kirk (1993–2025)	United States	Europe of Sovereign Nations
2026	Laureate	International Criminal Court (founded in 2002)	Netherlands	Progressive Alliance of Socialists and Democrats
2026	Finalists			
2026	Finalists	Tundu Lissu (born 1968)	Tanzania	European People’s Party and European Conservatives and Reformists
2026	Finalists	Taraneh Rahimi (born ?); Romina Rahimi (born ?)	Iran	Patriots for Europe
2026	Longlist			
2026	Longlist	Hussam Abu Safiya (born 1973)	Palestine	Greens–European Free Alliance and The Left in the European Parliament
2026	Longlist	Nayib Bukele (born 1981)	El Salvador	Europe of Sovereign Nations Group
2026	Longlist	Standing Together (founded in 2015)	Israel	Renew Europe

== See also ==
- Nobel Peace Prize
- Gandhi Peace Prize
