= Muthgard Hinkelmann-Toewe =

German social worker (1940–2026)

- Born: 12 February 1940; German Reich
- Died: 20 July 2026 (aged 86); Germany
- Occupations: Social worker Professor
- Years active: 1985–2026
- Employer: Fulda University of Applied Sciences
- Known for: Reducing rates of female genital mutilation in Kisii County, Kenya

Muthgard Hinkelmann-Toewe (12 February 1940 – 20 July 2026) was a German human rights activist and social worker. She was known for founding the Fulda-Mosocho-Projekt, a non-governmental organisation that helped reduce rates of female genital mutilation in Kisii County, Kenya.

== Activism ==
Hinkelmann-Toewe worked as a social work professor and researcher at the Fulda University of Applied Sciences in Fulda, Hesse, for 25 years. In 1990, she founded the Centre for Practice-Oriented Feminist Studies (more commonly known as the Centre for Profs), which researched strategies and models aimed at promoting gender equality and addressing issues of gender-related violence, sexuality, and reproduction. The Centre for Profs was later accredited as a consultative service for the United Nations Economic and Social Council.

Hinkelmann-Toewe first visited Africa in 1985, when she attended the World Conference on Women in Nairobi, Kenya. While there, she met a Luo woman, and they began working together to provide education and support about family planning for Luo women. As a result, Hinkelmann-Toewe began regularly visiting Kenya to facilitate sessions while still lecturing in Fulda.

In 1997, a Gusii woman approached Hinkelmann-Toewe asking if she would provide similar support to the Gusii community living in Mosocho in Kimii County. Hinkelmann-Toewe learned that around 98% of Gusii women had undergone female genital mutilation. In 2001, Hinkelmann-Toewe founded the Fulda-Mosocho-Projekt (lit. 'Fulda-Mosocho Project'), which aimed to help reduce female genital mutilation rates in Mosocho by utilising a value-centred approach. Devised and formulated by Hinkelmann-Toewe, the approach included supporting parents and carers of girls to understand that their value was not dependent upon their gender, in addition to providing them with information about sex and the reproductive system, with the hope that this would decrease the number of parents feeling their children needed to undergo the procedure. Hinkelmann-Toewe was able to get funding from Stiftung für Menschen in Not and Lebendige Kommunikation. Funding was subsequently received from the Federal Ministry for Economic Cooperation and Development.

In 2004, a ceremony was held in Kisii County where 2000 Gusii girls were welcomed as full members into the community without having undergone female genital mutilation. By 2010, it was estimated that the Fulda-Mosocho-Projekt had prevented 16, 000 women and girls from undergoing the procedure, with Deutscher Akademikerinnenbund finding that the rates of female genital mutilation had reduced from 98% to 30%. That same year, UNICEF published The Dynamics of Social Change, which called the Fulda-Mosocho-Projekt one of the five most successful prevention campaigns in the world; in 2019, UNICEF concluded that the organisation had saved 30, 000 lives in the region.

In 2018, the Commissioner of Kisii County asked for the Fulda-Mosocho-Projekt to expand its work to cover all of the county; by the following year, it was operating in Kisii South and Marani.

Hinkelmann-Toewe died in 2026 in Göttingen.

== Recognition ==
In 2006, Hinkelmann-Toewe was longlisted for the Sakharov Prize by Alexander Nuno Alvaro and other members of the European Parliament for her work reducing rates of female genital mutilation in Kenya.

On 10 November 2010, she received the Golden Peace Dove from the Deutscher Akademikerinnenbund.
