= Rafiullah =

Rafiullah may refer to:

- Rafiullah (cricketer) (born 1996), Omani cricketer
- Syed Rafiullah, Pakistani politician first elected in 2018
- Rafiullah Bidar, Afghan human rights activist
