= Berhane Ras-Work =

Berhane Ras-Work (born c.1940) is an Ethiopian anti-FGM activist. She was the founding President of the Inter-African Committee on Traditional Practices Affecting the Health of Women and Children (IAC).

== Life ==
Born Berhane Asfaw, into a Christian Ethiopian family, she attended a European-run primary school and at the age of fifteen went to boarding school in Addis Ababa. She gained a BA in education at the Jesuit University. After marrying a US-trained engineer, Terrefe Ras-Work, she accompanied her husband to Geneva in 1970. She gained a MA in International Relations from the Graduate Institute of Development Studies in Geneva.

A television program "started her thinking" about female genital mutilation, and what could be done to raise consciousness and confront the issue. In 1977 diplomats and activists living in Geneva founded the NGO Working Group on Traditional Practices Affecting the Heath of Women and Children. This was a precursor to the IAC, which was founded in 1984. Ras-Work was elected the first IAC President at the inaugural meeting in Dakar.

In 1995 Berhane Ras-Work received the United Nations Population Award. In 2010 she was awarded the Grand Decoration of Honour for Services to the Republic of Austria.

== Works ==
- (ed.) Traditional practices affecting the health of women and children in Africa: report on a seminar. Dakar: Ministry of Public Health, 1978
- 'Female genital mutilations', Voices from Africa, No. 4, pp. 89–96
- 'Violence against women as a traditional practice', in Yvonne Preiswerk and Mary-Josée Burnier, eds., Tant qu’on a la santé: Les déterminants socio-économiques et culturels de la santé dansles relations sociales entre les femmes et les hommes, Genevalie: Graduate institute publications, 1998
- the unbidden pain. Janus publishing co, 2014. ISBN 978-1857568097
