= Mariam Lamizana =

Burkinabé sociologist, social worker, (born 1951)

Mariam Lamizana (born 1951) is a Burkinabé sociologist, social worker, feminist activist and politician.

== Life ==
Mariam Lamizana was born 1951 in Bobo-Dioulasso, Burkina Faso (then Upper Volta). She is the daughter of Sangoulé Lamizana, the military officer who was President of Upper Volta from 1966 to 1980.

A campaigner against female genital mutilation, Lamizana was the first president of the National Committee to Combat the Practice of Excision (CNLPE) and is President of the Inter-African Committee on Traditional Practices Affecting the Health of Women and Children (IAC). She served in the government of Burkina Faso as Minister of Social Action and National Solidarity from 2001 to 2002. She is also President of Voix des Femmes, created in 2000.

Lamizana was nominated for the 2009 Sakharov Prize.
