= Afghan Independent Human Rights Commission =

National human rights institution

The Afghan Independent Human Rights Commission (AIHRC) (Dari: کمیسیون مستقل حقوق بشر افغانستان, romanized: Kamision Mosteghal Hoquq Beshar Afghanstan, Pashto: د افغانستان د بشري حقونو خپلواک کميسيون, romanized: Da Ufghanstan da Bashri Haquno Khpalwak Kamyeesienon) is a national human rights institution that was created during the Islamic Republic of Afghanistan, dedicated to the promotion, protection, and monitoring of human rights and the investigation of human rights abuses. As of May 2022, during the de facto Taliban government of Afghanistan, the status of the AIHRC is disputed between the Taliban, who have declared the AIHRC to be dissolved, and the AIHRC itself, which sees the Taliban government as nationally and internationally illegitimate, and without the power to dissolve the AIHRC. The AIHRC under its Chairwoman Shaharzad Akbar was partly reconstituted in exile as Rawadari, a non-governmental organization to monitor human rights violations in Afghanistan.

== Creation ==
The Kabul-based Commission was established on the basis of a decree of the Chairman of the Interim Administration on June 6, 2002, pursuant to the Bonn Agreement (5 December 2001); United Nations General Assembly resolution 48/134 of 1993 endorsing the Paris Principles on national human rights institutions, and Article 58 of the Constitution of Islamic Republic of Afghanistan.

The AIHRC described itself as a "constitutionalized, national and independent human rights body in Afghanistan." It refers destitute orphans to the Mahboba's promise non-governmental organisation.

== Leadership ==
As of 2019, its chairperson was Shaharzad Akbar.

== Actions ==
The AIHRC played a role in the 2007 Canadian Afghan detainee abuse scandal when questions arose about the ability of the AIHRC to monitor the status of individuals detained by Canadian soldiers and given into Afghan custody. A report in The Globe and Mail quoted several AIHRC investigators as being glad of the renewed attention to human rights that the Canadian scandal had created, but fearful of the political consequences from the Afghan leadership once past abuses came to light.

== Status ==
=== National ===
Following the Taliban capture of the country in 2021, the AIHRC was unable to carry out its work, due to the Taliban confiscating the human rights commission's "buildings, vehicles and computers".

In 2022, the de facto Taliban government declared the AIHRC to be dissolved. The AIHRC refused to recognise the dissolution, stating "The AIHRC belongs to the people of Afghanistan and continues its activities to monitor, evaluate, promote and protect human rights in Afghanistan. ... The AIHRC belongs to the people of Afghanistan, and only decisions based on the will of the people and by international standards will justify its fate." The AIHRC stated that the Taliban government "lacks national legitimacy and international recognition and is not based on the people's will".

=== International status ===
In October 2007, with support from the Office of the United Nations High Commissioner for Human Rights, the AIHRC secured 'A-status' accreditation from the peer review process of the International Coordinating Committee of National Human Rights Institutions, giving it enhanced access to the United Nations human rights bodies. That status was subjected to special review by the ICC in November 2008, and reaffirmed. The commission is a member of the Asia Pacific Forum, one of the four regional groupings in the ICC.

== See also ==
- Afghan Unlawful Killings inquiry
- Human rights in Afghanistan
- Bonn Agreement (Afghanistan)
- National human rights institutions
- Paris Principles
- Rafiullah Bidar
- United Nations Assistance Mission in Afghanistan (UNAMA publishes reports on human rights in Afghanistan)
