= Ghazni University =

Public university in Ghazni, Afghanistan

- د غزني پوهنتون / دانشگاه غزنی
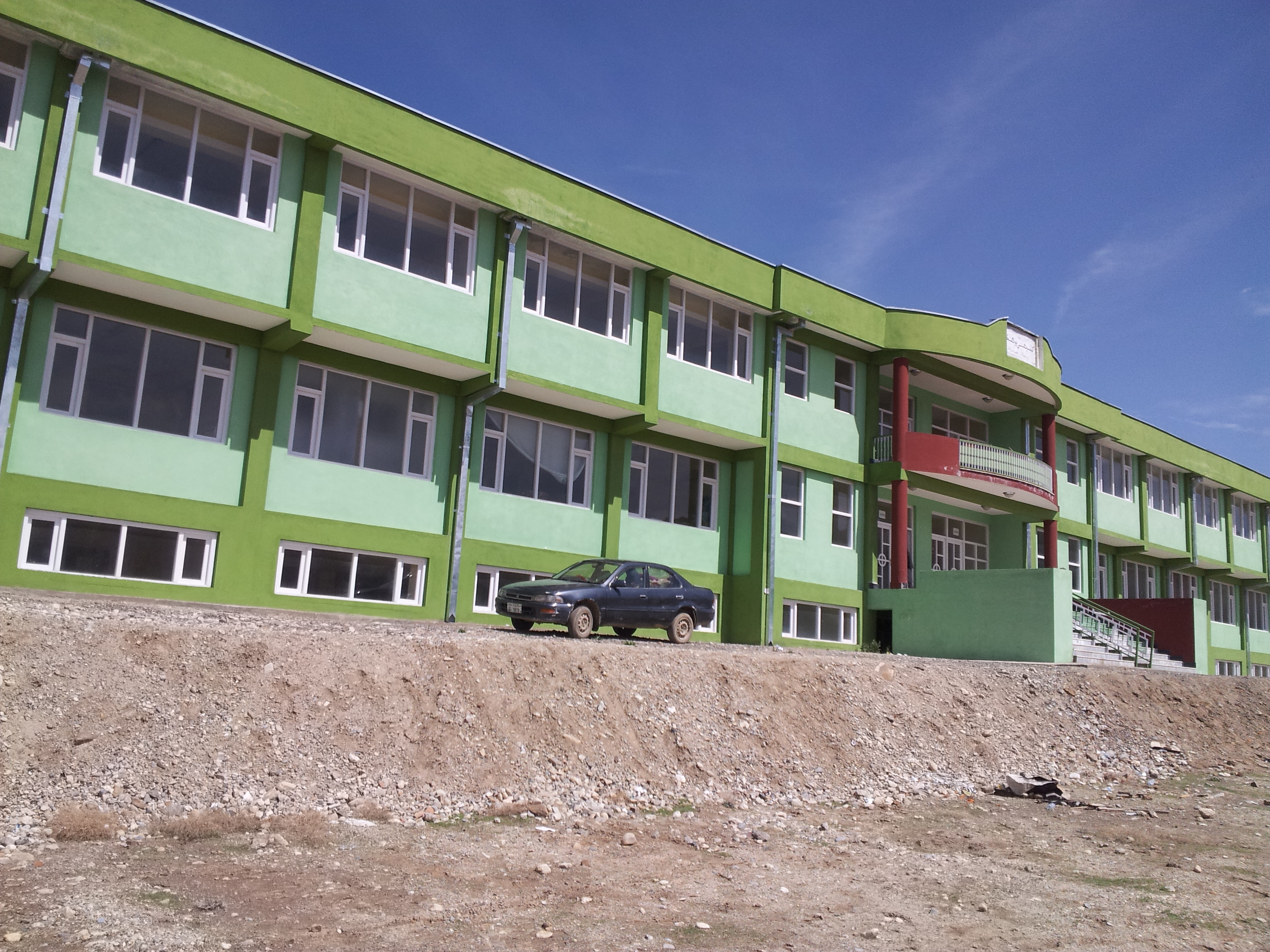
- Type: Public
- Established: 2008
- Rector: Mohammad Bayer Darmal
- Students: 4,000
- Location: Qala-e-Jawaz, Ghazni, Ghazni Province, Afghanistan; 33.530303°N 68.474180°E
- Website: gu.edu.af/en

Ghazni University (Note: Pashto: د غزني پوهنتون Dari: دانشگاه غزنی) is a public university in Ghazni, a city in central Afghanistan. It was established in 2008 and began with two faculties, the Faculty of Agriculture and the Faculty of Education. The university's first rector was Ahmad Shah Rafiqi. During its inaugural semester, the university had around 110 students (97 male and 14 female). As of 2019, the university has five faculties and enrolls around 4,000 students, 540 (13.5 percent) of which are women.

== History ==
The construction of the university was originally supported by the Polish Provincial Reconstruction Team (PRT) and after some time} it was fully supported by the Afghan government. The university gradually expanded and enrolled more students, creating a need for more faculties. Ahmad Shah Rafiqi was replaced by Abdul Qadeer Khamosh around the time of the expansion, and after two years he himself was replaced by Mohammad Bayer Darmal who is the current rector.

A new campus for the university was constructed in the city's eastern quarter. Two more faculties were added, the Faculty of Economics and the Faculty of Sharia (Islamic law). The Faculty of Literature & Languages was also later added.

On 16 September 2019, a bomb attached to a university minibus exploded, killing one and injuring five. A little over three weeks later on 8 October 2019, a bomb exploded in one of the university's classrooms, injuring at least 19 students.
