= Shaharzad Akbar =

Afghan human rights activist

Shaharzad Akbar (born 1987) is an Afghan human rights activist who served as the chairperson of the Afghanistan Independent Human Rights Commission until the beginning of 2022.

== Early life and education ==
Akbar was born in Jawzjan Province in 1987, the daughter of the leftist politician and writer Ismail Akbar, who had been a member of the armed resistance against the Soviet occupation of Afghanistan. She is of Hazara and Uzbek heritage. Following the rise of the Taliban and the establishment of the Islamic Emirate of Afghanistan in 1996, Akbar and her family sought refuge in Pakistan, eventually returning and settling in Mazar-i-Sharif after the collapse of the Taliban regime in 2001.

Akbar graduated with a BA in Anthropology from Smith College, before going on to become the first Afghan woman to complete postgraduate studies at the University of Oxford, where she was awarded a Weidenfeld-Hoffmann Trust scholarship and obtained an MPhil in 2011.

== Career ==
Akbar has previously acted as an analyst for the Free and Fair Elections Foundation. She has also contributed articles for the BBC, The Washington Post, Newsweek, Al Jazeera, and CNN. She previously served as a delegate during some of the intra-Afghan negotiations between the Afghan government and the Taliban in Doha.

In 2010, Akbar founded QARA consulting, a firm owned and run by young Afghans, based in Kabul. In 2012, she was a founding member and first chairperson of Afghanistan 1400, a youth-led political movement focused on promoting democratic values and the notion of Afghanistan as a united country among its young people.

Between 2014 and 2017, Akbar was the country director for Open Society Afghanistan, focusing on women's rights issues and promoting good governance in Afghanistan. Between 2017 and 2018, she served as a senior advisor to Ashraf Ghani, the then-President of Afghanistan, on high development councils.

Since 2019, Akbar has served as the chairperson of the Afghanistan Independent Human Rights Commission. Prior to the US withdrawal from Afghanistan, Akbar had called on the American government to consider the importance of civic space and the safety of civilians prior to US soldiers leaving the country, urging them to demand the Taliban to commit to a ceasefire, including the targeted killings of Afghan citizens, as a condition of American withdrawal. She also requested the US properly investigate allegations of abuse levied at American soldiers during the War in Afghanistan following concerns that some soldiers were being granted impunity for their actions.

Following the collapse of the Islamic Republic of Afghanistan and the Taliban recapturing Afghanistan in August 2021, Akbar became a vocal critic of the new regime, and particularly their treatment of women. She has called on international bodies including the United Nations to pressure the Taliban to lift their ban on girls attending school, as well as to cease their targeted killings of Afghans linked to the previous government. She has also criticised international agencies for sending male-only delegations to meet with Taliban officials, accusing them of normalising gender discrimination and validating the Taliban's attempted "erasure of women" in Afghanistan.

Shahrzad established a human rights organisation in exile called Rawadari. Rawadari is an Afghan human rights organisation that aims to deepen and grow the human rights culture of Afghanistan, ultimately reducing the suffering of all Afghans, especially women and girls. Rawadari helps build an Afghan human rights movement, monitors human rights violations, and pursues justice and accountability for violations. Rawadari works with individuals and collectives inside and outside Afghanistan.

== Recognition ==
In 2017, the World Economic Forum named Akbar as a Young Global Leader.

In 2021, Akbar was named as a laureate of the Franco-German Prize for Human Rights and the Rule of Law in recognition of her work defending human rights in Afghanistan. That same year, she was a finalist for the Sakharov Prize.

== Personal life ==
Akbar is married to Timor Sharan, a Hazara from Bayman Province, who serves as the deputy director of the Independent Directorate of Local Governance.

Akbar speaks Uzbek, Dari, Pashto, and English.
