= Aura Lolita Chavez Ixcaquic =

Guatemalan human rights activist

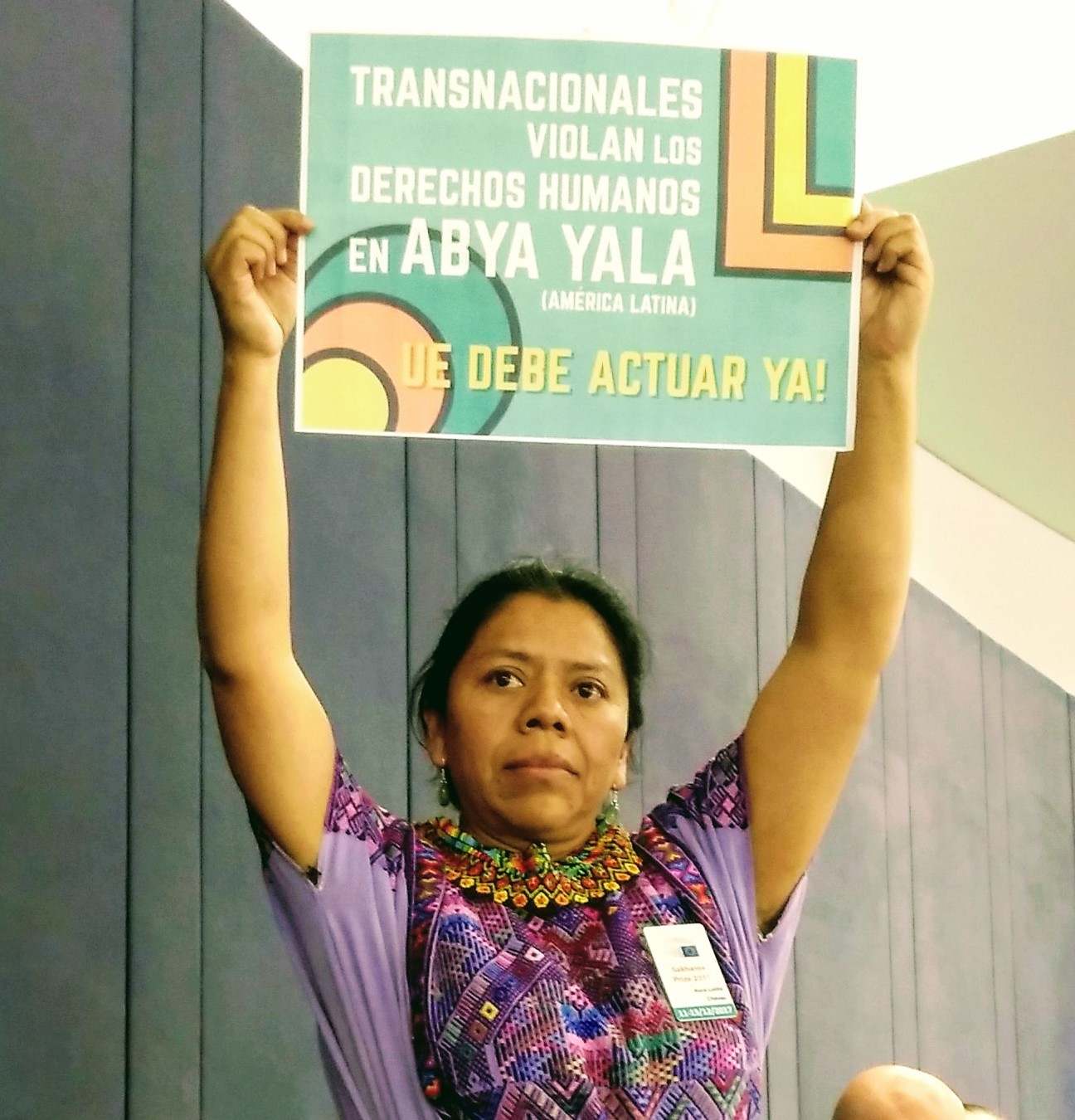
- Lolita at the European Parliament
- Born: 1972 (age 53–54)

Aura Lolita Chávez Ixcaquic (born 1972), known as Lolita, is a women's rights activist, Guatemalan K'iche' leader, and international leader in the struggle to preserve natural resources. She was a finalist of the Sakharov Human Rights Prize in 2017 when she was living in the Basque Country in Spain because of death threats in her own country.

== Life ==
She is originally from in the El Quiché region, the western territories of Guatemala. She is a member of the Council of K'iche Peoples for the Defense of Life, Mother Nature, Land and Territory (CPK) of the Quiché people, founded in 2007 to face the effects of the Dominican Republic–Central America Free Trade Agreement. The organization is defined as "a set of communities that have organized themselves to defend their territories, their right to self-determination and also the rights to life as the indigenous peoples desire it". Milita also campaigns against violence directed to women.

On July 4, 2012, she attended a peaceful demonstration against the mayor of Santa Cruz del Quiché, a member of the Patriot Party. On the way back, her bus was ambushed by a group of men armed with machetes, knives, and canes. Four women were injured. On 7 June 2017, a group of gunmen attacked her and some other members of CPK and made them to flee. She received a death threat. Between 1960 and 1996, during the civil war in Guatemala, the Quiché people experienced genocidal attacks.

She is threatened with death in her country, which is why she has been living in the Basque Country in Spain since 2017.

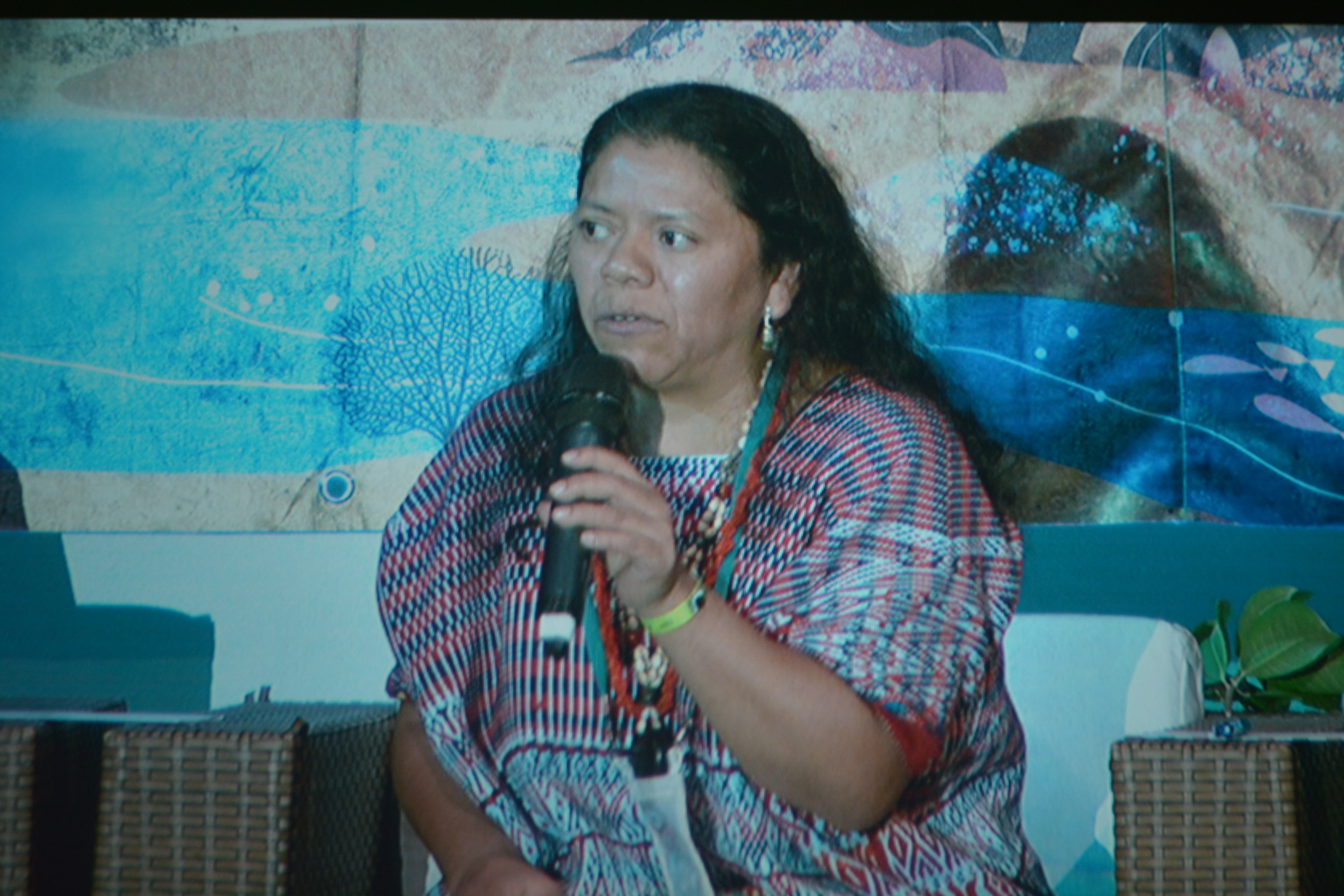
Aura Lolita Chavez Ixcaquic, finalist for the Sakharov Prize 2017

In October 2017, the European Parliament included Chávez among the three finalists of the Sakharov Human Rights Prize.

She received the Ignacio Ellacuría Award from the Lehendakari of the Basque government Iñigo Urkullu in January 2018 for her work in defending the land of the K'iche people against exploitation.
