= Stéphanie Gibaud =

European bank tax fraud whistleblower

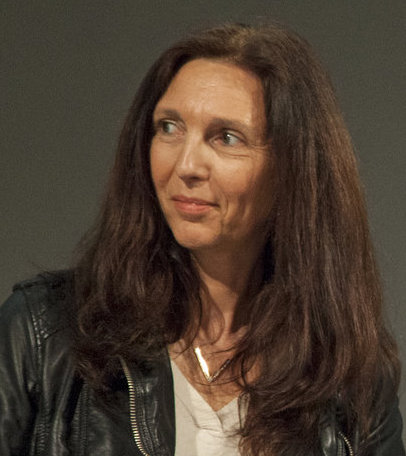
- Stéphanie Gibaud speaking in 2019
- Born: June 6, 1965 (age 61); Lille (France)
- Occupations: Marketing & communications manager
- Known for: whistleblower
- Website: www.stephaniegibaud.com

Stéphanie Balique-Gibaud is a public relations and an event marketing specialist. Working for UBS France in Paris, she has in particular played a decisive role in blowing the whistle on the practices of tax evasion and laundering of tax fraud in organized group of UBS AG (Switzerland) with the complicity of UBS France.

== Biography ==
After studying languages in Lille, France, she worked for TransManche Link (TML, the Channel Tunnel), the embassy of the United States of America, the RC Lens football club and UBS wealth management in Paris.

She joined UBS in 1999 where her mission was to develop partnerships with luxury brands and organise client events in France. She has played a key role in blowing the whistle and making public the fact that UBS AG has encouraged tax evasion and money laundering practices with the complicity of UBS France.

She has been acting as a whistleblower since 2008 working with French authorities and namely with the French customs. She has also been listened by the Belgian authorities (UBS Belgium being under investigation).

She published a book where she explained the practices of UBS (translation into English available in Sept. 2015).

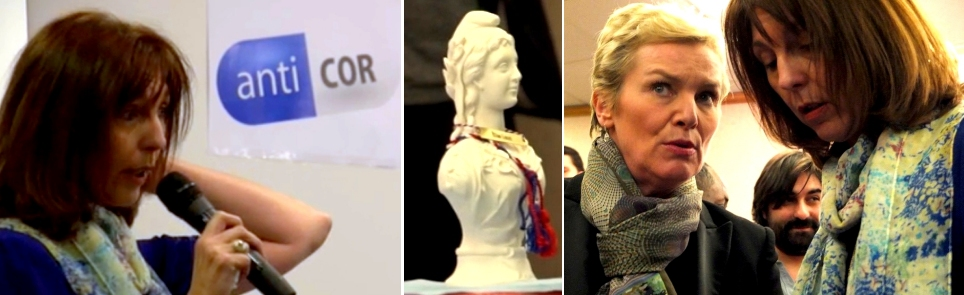
Anticor ethics prize 2015

She received the Anticor ethics prize in January 2015 before being invited to testify by the "Tax Ruling" commission of the European Parliament in Brussels.

In June 2015, she was officially invited to an audition at the embassy of Argentina in Paris by Ricardo Echegaray, minister of finance of Argentina and the members of the Argentinian "commission bicamerale" who are working on the mechanism of tax evasion.

Stephanie Gibaud has publicly asked Argentina to bring to the G20 the question of the protection of citizens who put themselves at risk for standing up in the public interest.

On the 10th of September, 2015, Stéphanie Gibaud was nominated for the Sakharov Prize 2015, together with two other whistleblowers, Edward Snowden and Antoine Deltour.

== The UBS case ==
During her eight years with UBS France, her job was to develop partnerships with luxury houses and organize events for wealth clients of the bank on French territory.

In 2007, American banker Bradley Birkenfeld’s story got out. His disclosures to the U.S. government led to a massive fraud investigation into UBS and other banks that had enabled tax evasion by American taxpayers.

All the internal procedures of the bank were subsequently modified everywhere in the world where UBS had offices.

In June 2008, Gibaud was asked by her manager to delete the content of her hard drive because the office of the Paris general director was searched.

These files contained the names and coordinates of clients and prospects of the bank as well as the names of their respective client advisers in France, Switzerland, Luxembourg, Belgium and Monaco.

Gibaud refused to comply with the instruction, and her manager repeated her request and asked her to toss the content of her paper archives. A tug-of-war then started and Gibaud complained of harassment, exclusion and discrimination.

Several UBS executives confirmed to her that sales service proposed by Swiss client advisers was illegal in France. They further explained that UBS France had a parallel accounting named a "milk notebook," which gathered on a monthly basis the tax evasion transactions of French clients to offshore locations.

UBS France tried to fire her in 2009 but failed. In 2010, it unsuccessfully filed a complaint against her for defamation. She was finally laid off in 2012.

As a whistleblower by the French labor inspection as of 2008 and the public prosecutor when filing a complaint against her employer at the end of 2009, Gibaud caught the ear of BRPD, the brigade of repression of the crime against the people (part of the French financial brigade) in February 2011 and March 2015 and several times by customs and judicial investigators in 2011 and 2012.

She also spoke to Belgian investigators as part of the indictment of UBS Belgium in July 2014 and several times in 2015.

In 2012, Gibaud spoke to by Eric Bocquet, senator and reporter of the tax evasion commission and then by Yann Galut, deputy, in July 2013. Her name appears in the reports of the Senate commission of inquiry dated July 17, 2012. and October 17, 2013

In February 2014, she published "La Femme Qui en Savait Vraiment Trop" (The Woman Who Knew Too Much) at the Cherche Midi publisher. She explained the dysfunctions of the bank, namely the illegal sales service of Swiss client advisers on French territory and tax evasion.

Antoine Peillon, an investigative journalist who signed the preface of her book said Gibaud was one of the sources for her book "Ces 600 Milliards Qui Manquent à la France" (600 Billion Missing in France) published in March 2013.

On March 5, 2015, a labor court ruled in favor of Gibaud and fined UBS €30,000 for harassment. The bank did not appeal the case.

In May 2015, Gibaud and her publisher was hit with a complaint from UBS France for defamation.

On May 11, 2015 she spoke to the tax ruling committee in the European Parliament in Brussels, invited by Alain Lamassoure. Eva Joly, European deputy, who was seating in the commission, gave her support to Gibaud in an interview with France Inter (radio) on January 24, 2015.

In June 2015, Gibaud co-wrote a tribune in L'Express magazine with Nicolas Dupont-Aignan to defend the cause of whistleblowers.

On June 17, 2015, Gibaud was officially received by Ricardo Etchegaray (AFIP) at the Argentine embassy in Paris. She was spoke to members of the bicameral commission of the Argentinian congress. who investigate tax evasion. She then asked Argentina to mention the protection of those who put themselves in danger for the common good to the G20

== Publication ==
- La femme qui en savait vraiment trop, Paris, publisher Le Cherche Midi, published in 2014.
