= Inter-African Committee on Traditional Practices Affecting the Health of Women and Children =

Non-governmental organization

The Inter-African Committee on Traditional Practices Affecting the Health of Women and Children (IAC) (French: Comité interafricain sur les pratiques traditionnelles affectant la santé des femmes et des enfants) is a non-governmental organization (NGO) which seeks to change social values and raise consciousness towards eliminating female genital mutilation (FGM) and other traditional practices which affect the health of women and children in Africa.

== History ==
The IAC began at a seminar in Dakar in 1984 with a focus on fighting harmful practices relating to female genital mutilation (FGM), childbirth, nutrition and food, early marriage; and promoting traditional practices considered beneficial, such as breastfeeding and baby massage. Fighting FGM is the main focus of their work. Now based in Addis Ababa, the IAC also has 32 national branches (known as National Committees) in 28 countries in Africa. It has a liaison office in Geneva and 15 affiliates in Europe, Canada, Japan, New Zealand and the US. In 1990, the IAC adopted the term "female genital mutilation" to describe the procedure previously referred to as "female circumcision". According to a 1995 publication, the main focus of their strategy for eliminating FGM is through education. The founding President of the IAC was the Ethiopian feminist Berhane Ras Work. From 2009 to 2014 Isatou Touray served as Secretary-General of the IAC.

The IAC's current President is Mariam Lamizana from Burkina Faso. Safia Elmi Djibril is vice-president, representing Kadra Mahamoud Haid, the First Lady of Djibouti. The current Secretary General is Assibi Napoe from Togo, Chief Coordinator of Education International's African regional office.

== Contributions ==
The IAC considers that legislative change related to FGM in Burkina Faso, Côte d'Ivoire, Djibouti, Egypt, Ghana, Guinea, Senegal, Tanzania and Togo is a result of the lobbying work carried out by the IAC as well as by other NGOs.

== See also ==
- Maputo Protocol
