= Salih Mahmoud Osman =

Sudanese human rights lawyer

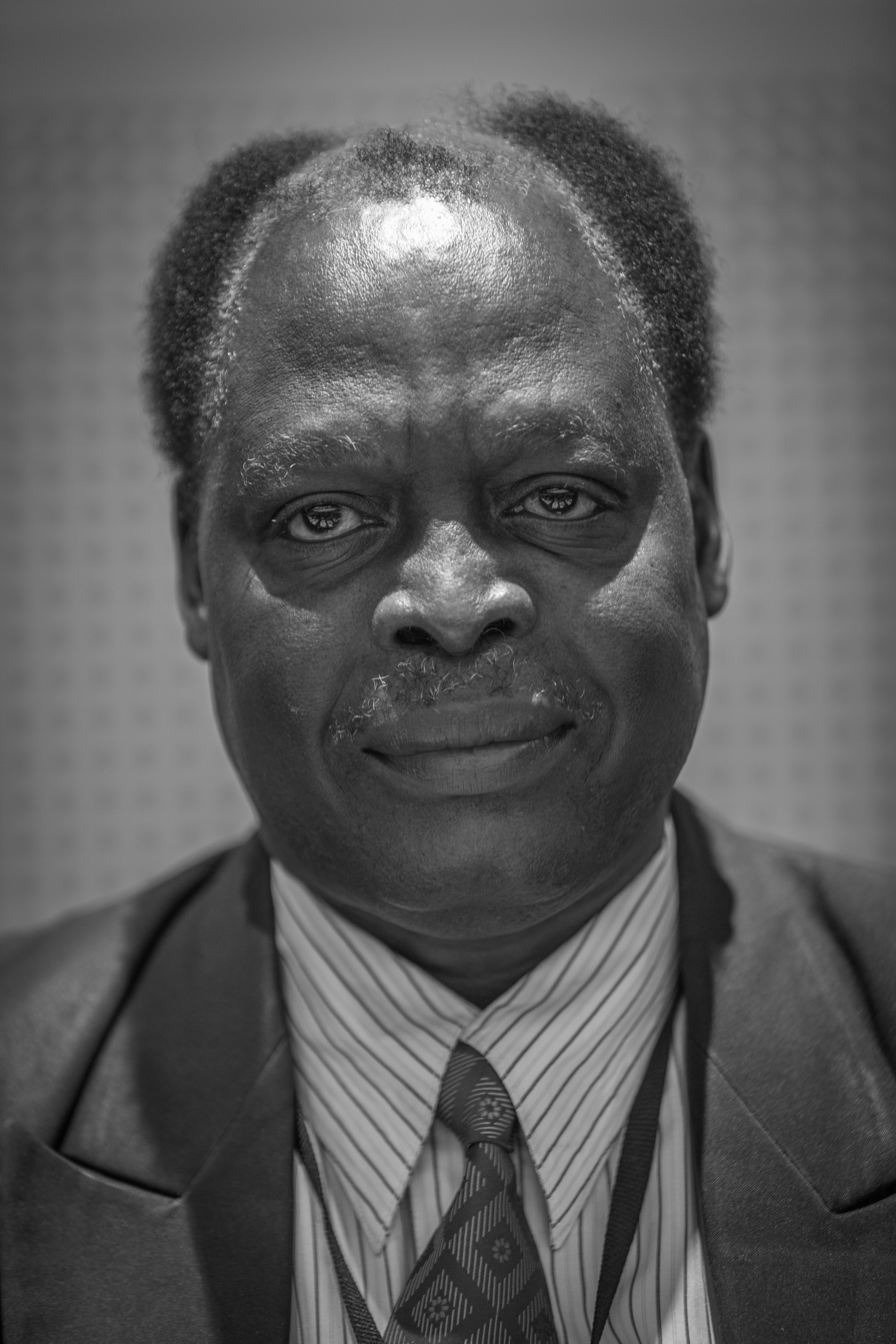
Salih Mahmoud Osman in 2013

Salih Mahmoud Osman (Arabic: صالح محمود عثمان, romanized: Ṣāliḥ Maḥmūd ʻUthmān; born 1957 in Darfur) is a Sudanese human rights lawyer.

Osman is well known for having provided free legal representation to hundreds of victims of ethnic violence (human rights activist) in Sudan over more than two decades. He is from the Jebel Mara area in central Darfur, western Sudan. He has been widely honored for his work on human rights issues in Sudan, receiving the Human Rights Watch award in 2005, the International Human Rights Award from the American Bar Association in 2006, and was included in European Voices 50 most influential persons in Europe in 2007. Also in 2007 the European Parliament voted unanimously to award him the Sakharov Prize for Freedom of Thought.

He was detained three times for his courageous advocacy in defense of human rights, but was never charged with any offense.

In 2005, he was appointed to the National Assembly of Sudan where he works to promote legal reform and establishment of the rule of law in Sudan.
