= Detention of Barbie and Peter Reynolds =

2025 arrest of British-Afghan citizens

On 1 February 2025, British-Afghan married couple Barbie Reynolds (then 75) and Peter Reynolds (then 79) were arrested by the Taliban in Bamyan Province, Afghanistan, while returning to their home. The couple had run training projects through their organisation Rebuild starting in 2009, including one project in Bamiyan in which they trained mothers and children. Despite receiving a "certificate of appreciation" from the Taliban after they regained control of Afghanistan in August 2021, they were detained alongside their Chinese-American friend Faye Hall and a local Afghan translator. Their home was searched and their employees were interrogated.

The couple were separated from each other in Pul-e-Charkhi prison by 16 March. They were subject to deteriorating health conditions and multiple court appearances, with no charges having been brought against them and no officially stated reason for their arrest. Hall was released on 29 March, and Peter and Barbie Reynolds were released almost 6 months later, on 19 September.

== Background ==
After meeting at the University of Bath and forming a romantic relationship in the 1960s, Peter and Barbie Reynolds married in Kabul in 1970. In 2009 they began to run training projects in five schools in Kabul, and set up the organization Rebuild to do so, offering their services to businesses, government agencies, educational organizations and nongovernmental groups. Rebuild's newsletter describes itself as "dedicated to fostering healthy relationships in homes, workplaces and communities across Afghanistan". They taught participatory learning and learning through play, as well as programmes in communication skills. They additionally ran one project in Bamiyan in which they trained mothers and children. This continued for 18 years. They have five children; three sons and two daughters. Sarah Entwistle, their eldest child, lives in Daventry, Northamptonshire in the United Kingdom. Their other children include Susie Romer and Jonathan Reynolds. They additionally have 17 grandchildren and 3 great grandchildren.

Upon the return to power of the Taliban in August 2021, most of the staff employed by the couple left. Despite this, the Reynolds insisted on staying in the country. Their daughter Entwistle has stated that the couple said "they could not leave when Afghans were in their hour of need", and that they later persuaded a group of 65 senior Taliban leaders to listen to their presentation on training teachers in schools through active participatory learning. She has said the leaders were impressed by this and said they would like their training projects set up in every province of Afghanistan, awarding Barbie "a certificate of appreciation" from the Taliban, the first woman to have received this award. Their Bamiyan project for mothers and children was initially approved by the local authorities under the Taliban system, despite their policies against women such as a ban on women working and on female education beyond primary school. In 2022, the Taliban announced that women would be banned from working for non-governmental organisations (NGOs), and in December 2024 it said it would close any NGOs that employed women. In 2024, Peter Reynolds has a mini-stroke, meaning that he required crucial heart medicine.

At the time of their arrest they had a house in Nayak, Bamyan Province and lived with two dogs. Peter Reynolds was 79 years old and Barbie Reynolds was 75. They were planning to visit the United States in April to celebrate Peter Reynolds' 80th birthday. The couple had dual citizenship in the United Kingdom and Afghanistan. At the time the United Kingdom did not recognise the Taliban and thus had no embassy in Kabul, limiting any assistance from the UK Foreign Office. Faye Hall, an American citizen and friend of the Reynolds from California, traveled to Afghanistan to help them with their humanitarian work the day before the arrest.

== Arrest and detention ==
=== February: Arrest and detention ===
On 1 February 2025, Peter and Barbie Reynolds and their Chinese-American friend Faye Hall, as well as a local translator for their business, were returning from Kabul to their home in Bamiyan, intending to return on a private plane rented by Hall. They were arrested by the Taliban; when Peter Reynolds was detained, he was told that their plane did not have proper landing permission, and that they would be released, with the airline stating that they had the correct paperwork. Their house was later raided, and they were later told that 59 books that were "against Islam" had been confiscated from their home. Over 30 of their employees who worked in Yakawlang and Kabul being interrogated including their accountant and tax people; questions included whether the couple were engaging in religious proselytising. The couple were also interrogated about the legitimacy of their Afghan passports which they had received from the Taliban passport office, as well as their business license. They put their thumbprints on a nine-page Criminal Investigation Department report. They were then told that no crime could be found. The Taliban did not publicly disclose the reason for their arrest, though speculation links it to their work involving women’s education, which conflicts with Taliban bans on girls’ schooling beyond age 12. Peter Reynolds was denied access to his heart medication, with his condition described as "not good" by an employee.

Initially, they were able to keep in touch with their children via text message; they said they were being held by the interior ministry of Afghanistan and that they were "fine". After three days, these texts stopped, due to the confiscation of the couple's phones.

On 24 February, Taliban official Abdul Mateen Qani said in a statement that "a series of considerations is being taken into account, and after evaluation, we will endeavour to release them as soon as possible." The next day, the Taliban stated that the couple were detained due to a "misunderstanding" that they had fake Afghan passports.

=== March: Delegate visits, separation, release of Faye Hall and phone calls ===
On 1 March, a delegate of the European Union, which had re-established its presence in Kabul, visited Barbie and Peter Reynolds and confirmed that they were still alive. Though the delegate was not allowed to see the couple nor Hall, they passed on a message from the Reynolds' children which read, "your kids say you are world news". The delegate was given their signatures as proof of receipt. Peter Reynolds was allowed to sign for his heart medication, which the delegate had taken to him.

By 16 March, the couple had been separated; Peter Reynolds had been moved to an undisclosed location in Pul-e-Charkhi prison, whereas Barbie Reynolds was moved to a separate wing of the same prison. Peter Reynolds' health, according to Entwistle, had "significantly deteriorated" with a chest infection, an infection in both eyes and serious digestive issues due to poor nutrition. She said a "reliable source" had informed her that he was "beaten and shackled" and was in "immense pain".

They were taken to court proceedings on 22 March, spending four hours sitting on the floor chained to other prisoners, and were informed that they would not be seen by the judge, with a different judge taking over the case. Peter Reynolds later recounted over a phone call that this judge was recused from the case after two appearances due to the death of his son. Their Afghan interpreter who was arrested with them was not allowed to translate for them, but was produced in court alongside them. The next day, Entwistle said that Barbie Reynolds was "collapsing due to malnutrition" as she was only receiving one meal per day as was mandated for women in the prison, with men receiving three per day. Peter Reynolds was experiencing tremors in his head and left arm. A European Union lawyer was able to give Peter Reynolds his heart pills and beta blockers again during the week of 24–30 March.

On 27 March, Hall and Barbie Reynolds were summoned to the gate of their prison compound by Taliban authorities; the two women both insisted that all four of the detainees arrested on 1 February should be released, and were then forcibly separated from each other. Hall asked again for the release of the other three detainees but was told that "we are only dealing with you", despite previous Taliban assurances that the four's case would be resolved together. On 29 March, Hall was released by the Taliban administration after US special presidential envoy for hostage affairs Adam Boehler as well as Qatari officials and others negotiated her release. This negotiation included the lifting of bounties worth $10 million from the heads of senior Taliban figures which included interior minister Sirajuddin Haqqani. She was received at the Qatari embassy in Kabul and confirmed to be in good health. Upon learning of Hall's release over a phone call, Peter Reynolds became concerned for Barbie Reynolds as this meant she was on her own. Barbie Reynolds later told Entwistle in a phone call that she was "in her element", and had started an English class for the other women in her prison as well as created a course for these women to use to teach others after her release.

=== April: Deterioration of health, Taliban comments and court appearances ===
Peter Reynolds was allowed to call from the prison yard of Pul-e-Charkhi prison using a payphone on 5 April; he described the prison as "the nearest thing to hell I can imagine", stating that he had "been joined up with rapists and murderers by handcuffs and ankle cuffs, including a man who killed his wife and three children, shouting away, a demon-possessed man." He said that the prison guards "shout[ed] all the time and beat people with a piece of piping," though had befriended guards who "shout[ed] at everyone but us". He was being given one meal a day of nan bread and chickpeas with green tea for breakfast. Despite this, he said this was far better than the conditions in which Barbie Reynolds was living, "a cage rather than a cell". Peter had been to court four times, whereas Barbie had been three times. Peter told his family not to pay "hush money or hostage money". Both were requesting to meet each other daily, though this request at the time had not been granted; it was the longest the couple had not spoken to each other since they entered their relationship. Peter said he would not leave the prison without his interpreter.

On 9 April, the Taliban authorities publicly commented on the Reynolds' case for the first time in over a month. Qani stated that "their problem (crime) is not that big. God willing, their problem will soon be resolved and a shariah (Islamic law) decision will be made. It is a small matter and should not be a cause for concern." On 10 April, Romer told 5 News that the couple had faced 29 "interrogations" as well as "three or four" court appearances, despite no charges being brought against them. During these appearances, despite being taken separately, they were able to see each other behind the mesh to mouth the words "I love you". Romer said the conditions in which her parents were being held were "absolutely horrific", with their meals limited to one per day and with mice and cockroaches "running around".

=== September: Release from prison ===
On Friday, 19 September, the couple was released after spending almost 8 months in captivity. The release was following Qatari mediation, after months of talks with Taliban authorities alongside the British government and the couple's family.

== Responses and reactions ==
As of 25 February 2025, the UK Foreign Office had confirmed awareness of the detention but had declined further comment.

=== Children's campaign for release ===
The Reynolds' four children contacted the UK Foreign Office, but assistance was limited due to the UK’s non-recognition of the Taliban and lack of an embassy in Kabul. On 24 February they issued an open letter to the Taliban, stating, "They have always been transparent about their presence and endeavors, diligently adhering to the shifting laws". They emphasized their parents’ dual citizenship and commitment to Afghanistan, rejecting any involvement in ransom negotiations, and wrote that they did "not understand the reasons behind their arrest". Entwistle additionally called for a boycott of England's ICC Champions Trophy cricket match versus Afghanistan, which was held on 25 February, to pressure the release of her parents.

In April 2025, their son Jonathan Reynolds called on US President Donald Trump to aid in their release, appearing in a video taken outside the White House. He said to Sky News that the couple had "never heard one accusation or one charge". In July 2025 Jonathan spoke to the BBC of his concerns over their rapidly deteriorating health in custody, Peter suffering convulsions and possible Parkinson’s symptoms, and Barbie affected by anaemia and malnutrition. The couple allegedly endured harsh prison conditions, including solitary confinement and detention alongside criminal offenders. The Taliban stated that medical care was provided and efforts were underway to secure their release. The United Nations and human rights groups called their detention “inhumane” and urged immediate transfer to a hospital, warning that the couple’s lives were at serious risk. Officials eventually confirmed the couple's wellbeing through a “proof of life” visit.
