= Ismail Mashal =

Afghan educator

- اسماعیل مشعل
- Born: c. 1986; Afghanistan
- Education: University of Mysore
- Occupations: Educator; Former journalist
- Known for: Public criticism of the Taliban's ban on education for women and girls; tearing up his academic credentials during a live TOLOnews interview in December 2022; distributing free books in Kabul in protest, leading to his arrest in February 2023
- Children: 1 daughter

Ismail Mashal (Pashto and Persian: اسماعیل مشعل; born c. 1986) is an Afghan educator and former journalist who received international press attention in 2022 due to his public criticisms of the Taliban's decision to ban education for women and girls, which led to him being imprisoned in February 2023.

== Career and personal life ==
Mashal had worked as a professor for ten years at the time of his arrest in 2023, including at three different academic institutions, including the University of Mysore in India, where he also studied; and most recently at his own private co-educational university in Kabul. By the time the Taliban announced that women would be prohibited from attending university in December 2022, Mashal's university had 450 female students studying subjects including computer science, economics, engineering, and journalism.

Mashal lives in Kabul with his mother, wife, and daughter. Mashal's wife was a teacher prior to the 2021 Taliban offensive.

== Activism ==
Following the suspension of higher education for women by the Taliban, Mashal chose to shut down his university completely rather than prevent female students from attending, saying that "education is either offered to all, or no one". Mashal has criticised the theological basis used by the Taliban to justify their actions with regards to women studying, stating his belief that God and Muhammad both advocated for female education, and that the Quran specifically referenced education as being compulsory for all genders. Mashal believed that forbidding education for women would lead to an increase in crime, as well as poverty, among Afghan citizens.

Mashal received national and international press attention in December 2022 during a live interview on TOLOnews when he ripped up his academic records in protest against the ban on university and secondary education for Afghan women. Mashal stated during the interview that he did not consider his qualifications to be necessary due to Afghanistan no longer being a country that valued education. Videos of the interview went viral on social media, and Mashal was subsequently interviewed by international journalists including the BBC's Yalda Hakim; he told her that he would not stay silent even if he was threatened with death, and called on all men to stand up for the rights of Afghan women and girls.

In February 2023, Mashal announced that he would distribute 21, 000 books from his university, for free, from a specially made cart, by walking around the neighbourhoods of Kabul and handing them out. He stated he was doing so to protest the banning of female education.

== Arrest and response ==
On 2 February 2023, Mashal was arrested while distributing books in the Deh Bori settlement in District 3 of Kabul.

Eyewitnesses, including Mashal's assistant Farid Fazli, reported that Mashal was physically assaulted by Taliban security forces during his arrest. Abdul Haq Hammad, from the Ministry of Information and Culture, confirmed that Mashal had been arrested due to his "provocative actions" by inviting journalists to watch him handing out books on a main road, causing "chaos" and "creating propaganda against the government"; he dismissed claims that Mashal had been assaulted, stating that Mashal had been treated well during his detainment. It was reported that Mashal's family and friends had not been informed of his location after his arrest.

Mashal's arrest was covered locally by TOLOnews, and internationally by sources like BBC News, Al Jazeera, and Radio France Internationale. Richard Bennett, the United Nations' Special Rapporteur on Afghanistan, called for Mashal's immediate release, calling the repression and targeting of peaceful civil activities as contrary to Afghanistan's international obligations. A spokesperson for the UN Secretary General António Guterres called for Mashal's immediate release and criticised the Taliban for "backsliding" on the issue of women and their education. On 14 February 2023, Mashal's family reported that they had still been given no information from the Taliban about his whereabouts.

== Release ==
Mashal was released from custody on 5 March 2023, according to a statement given by an aide Farid Fazli to Agence France-Presse. Fazli said that Mashal was "fine and in good health" but was not "in a condition to talk at the moment".
