= Freshta Karim =

Children's rights activist

Founder and director of Charmaghz

Personal details
- Born: 5 April 1992 (age 34) Kabul, Afghanistan
- Education: Somerville College (University of Oxford); Panjab University
- Occupation: Children's rights activist, television presenter
- Awards: Max-Herrmann-Preis (2019), Forbes 30 Under 30 (2019), BBC 100 Women (2021)

Freshta Karim (born 5 April 1992) is an Afghan children's rights activist and television presenter. She is the founder and director of Charmaghz, a Kabul-based NGO dedicated to promoting children's education in Afghanistan.

== Early life and career ==
Karim was born in Kabul, in 1992, about three weeks before the beginning of the Civil War. She spent her early life in Pakistan as a refugee before returning to Kabul. At the age of 12, she contacted a local television channel and was hired as a presenter for a program dedicated to children. During her teens, she worked for various local radio and television channels.

Karim studied Political Science at Panjab University, after which she completed a Master's degree in Public Policy at the University of Oxford (Somerville College).

After completing her studies in 2017, Karim returned to Afghanistan. In 2018, she founded an NGO, Charmaghz, to promote education, literacy, and critical thinking among children, in a country traumatised by decades of war. The organisation transforms disused public buses into mobile libraries, where children learn how to read and write, take part in artistic activities, and listen to stories.

After the Fall of Kabul in August 2021, Karim sought asylum in the United Kingdom, where she currently resides. On November 17, 2021, Karim made an address at the UN Security Council where she declared: “We need to make the effort to see the human in others, hear their suffering and their stories…Today I start this journey by declaring that no one is an enemy.”

Until 2023, Karim served as a senior advisor for the Malala Fund. In 2023, she was elected as a board member for BBC Media Action.

== Recognitions and awards ==
In 2019, Karim was awarded the Max-Herrmann-Preis, and was featured in the Forbes 30 Under 30 selection. In 2021, she was featured in the BBC 100 Women and was one of the finalists for the European Parliament's Sakharov Prize (granted that year to Alexei Navalny), along with ten other Afghan women.
