= The Restorers (Kenyan group) =

The Restorers is a group of six Kenyan activists, Dorcas Owinoh, Stacy Owino, Cynthia Otieno, Purity Achieng, Macrine Atieno and Ivy Akinyi. They are using technology to fight female genital mutilation (FGM). These activists from Kisumu were brought together by their mentor Dorcas Owinoh to develop an application called i-Cut which helps FGM victims. They are known to have been the only Africans that participated in the 2017 Technovation Challenge in Silicon Valley.

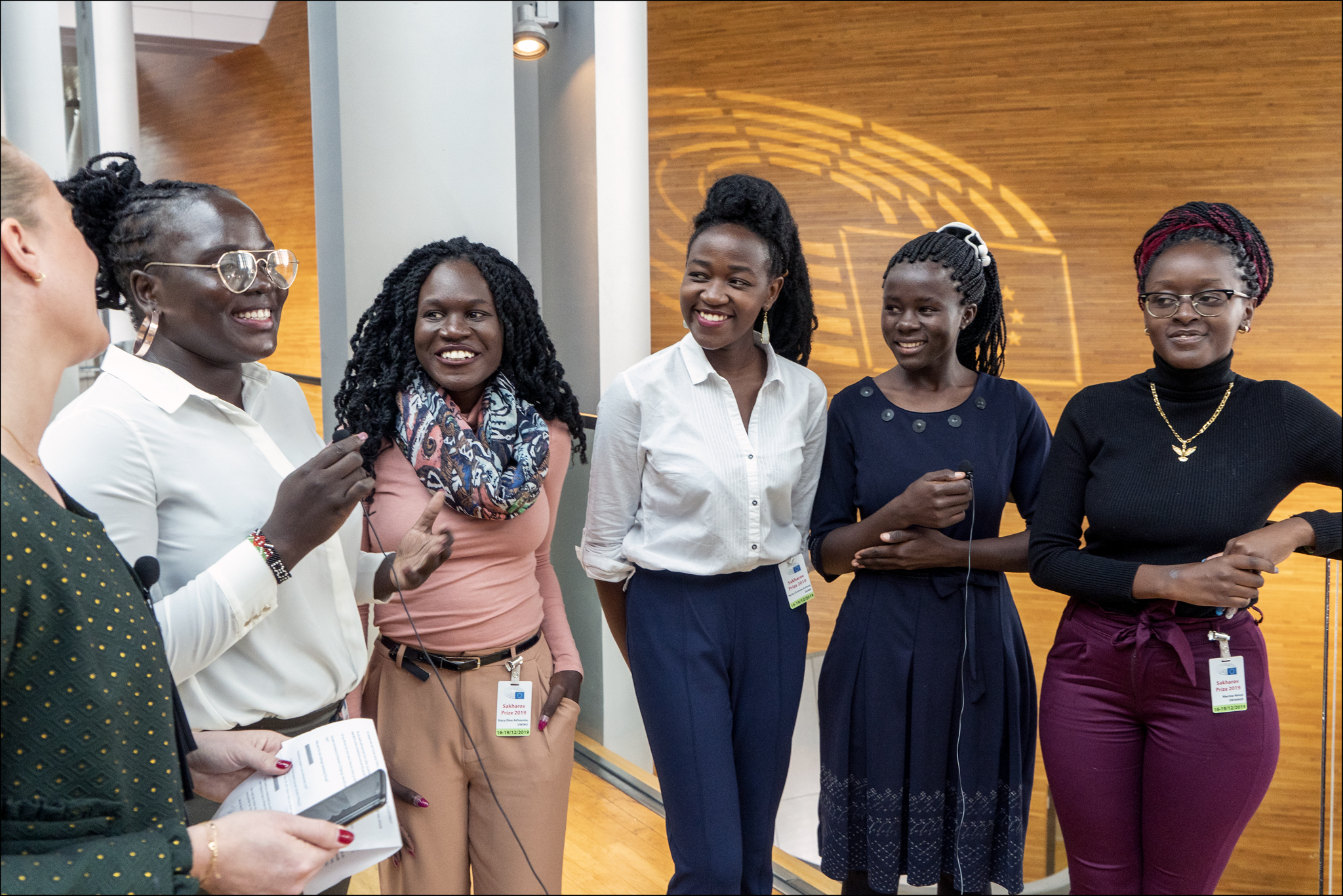

== i-Cut ==
i-Cut is the name of the mobile application developed by the Restorers. Victims and potential victims of FGM can use the i-Cut application to call for help or report to the police in case of an emergency.

== Awards and nominations ==
- 2018 - Winners of Africans of the year award (Daily Trust's 2018 )
- 2019 - Nominated for the European Parliament's Sakharov Prize for Freedom of Thought
