= Mary Wagner (activist) =

Canadian anti-abortion advocate (born 1974)

Mary Wagner (born 12 February 1974) is a Canadian anti-abortion advocate who has served prison sentences for her protests inside abortion clinics.

== Biography ==
Wagner protested in private abortion clinics in Toronto. She was arrested for the first time in 2012. Following a nearly two-year-long trial, Judge Fergus O'Donnell found her guilty of mischief and probation violation, sentencing her to nine months in prison and two years away from abortion clinics.

On December 23, 2014, after entering the Bloor West Village Women's Clinic abortion facility in Toronto, Wagner was arrested again and charged with disruption of business operations.

In 2015, Wagner argued in court that violating her probation order by entering an abortion clinic and distributing anti-abortion materials to patients was a necessity to protect the lives of unborn children. This was rejected by the court and upheld on appeal.

In April 2016, Wagner was released from prison after serving a sentence for counselling women at a clinic. On December 12, she was detained inside the abortion center in Bloor West Village, after dissuading one of the women from aborting. She was charged and sentenced to nine months in prison. In August 2017, Telewizja Polska reported that Wagner's mother appealed to Poles to send letters of support to a Canadian judge considering her sentence. In September 2017, Polish right-wingers staged a demonstration in support of Wagner in front of the Canadian Embassy in Warsaw.

== Political support ==
In 2012, Conservative Member of Parliament Maurice Vellacott presented a Queen Elizabeth II Diamond Jubilee Medal to Wagner. Some 60,000 medals were handed out, with each member of Parliament allocated thirty medals to disburse as they saw fit. Vellacott protested the honouring of Henry Morgentaler and hailed Wagner as a "hero of humanity". Interim liberal leader Bob Rae criticised the award as potentially illegal incitement.

In 2015 the Polish Post issued a stamp with her likeness.
