= Khemaïs Ksila =

Tunisian politician (born 1956)

- خميس قسيلة
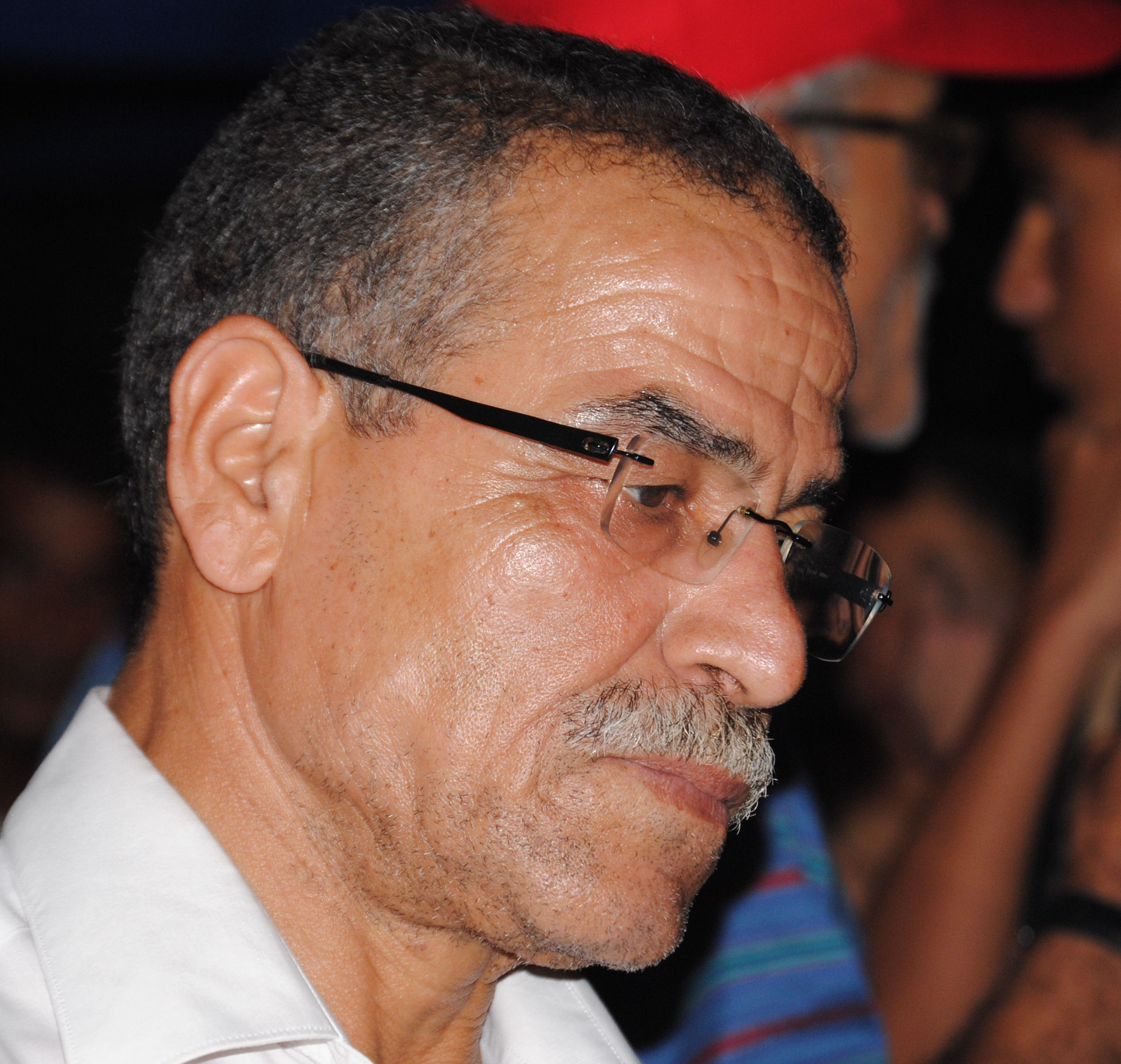
- Ksila in 2013

Member of the Assembly of the Representatives of the People for Nabeul 2
- In office 2 December 2014 – 13 November 2019

Member of the Constituent Assembly of Tunisia from the Ben Arous Governorate
- In office 22 November 2011 – 26 October 2014

Personal details
- Born: 1 May 1956 (age 69) Kelibia, Tunisia
- Party: Tunisian Alternative (2018–present)
- Other political affiliations: Ettakatol (until 2012); Nidaa Tounes (2012–2017); Tounes Awalan (2017–2018)
- Spouse: Fatima Ksila
- Children: 3

Khemaïs ben Mohamed ben Slimane Ksila (Arabic: خميس بن محمد قسيلة; born 1 May 1956) is a Tunisian politician.

== Career ==
=== Arrest ===
On 29 September 1997, Ksila published a statement condemning the harassment and discrimination he and his family had faced, including the confiscation of his passport, and the broader deterioration of human rights in Tunisia. He also announced the beginning of a hunger strike. He was detained on the same day as the publication of the statement. On 11 February 1998, he was sentenced to 3 years in prison and made to pay 1200 Tunisian dinars for "outrage to public order, spreading false information and inciting citizens to break the law". This received international condemnation, from Human Rights Watch and the United Nations Working Group on Arbitrary Detention. Ksila was later conditionally released on 22 September 1999.

=== Constituent Assembly (2011–2014) ===
In 2011, Ksila was elected to the Constituent Assembly of Tunisia as a member of the Ben Arous district. In February 2012, he left the Ettakatol party, citing their alliance with Ennahda and a lack of internal dialogue. He joined Nidaa Tounes in September 2012, becoming a member of its executive committee.

=== Assembly of the Representatives of the People (2014–2019) ===
In 2014, Ksila was elected to the Assembly of the Representatives of the People. He joined Tounes Alawan on 24 July 2017 and joined Tunisian Alternative when the two parties merged in September 2018. He announced on 21 June 2019 that he would not be running for re-election to the Assembly.

== Personal life ==
Ksila was born in Kelibia on 1 May 1956.

Ksila is married to Fatima Ksila and has 3 children.
