= Rafiullah Bidar =

Afghan politician

Rafiullah Bidar is a former regional director of the Afghan Independent Human Rights Commission in Gardez. He is of the Pashayi ethnic group, a minority in Afghanistan.

The Afghan Independent Human Rights Commission was set up with funding from the United States Congress. In an interview with the UK newspaper The Guardian Bidar said:

"All I do nowadays is chart complaints against the US military. Many thousands of people have been rounded up and detained by them. Those who have been freed say that they were held alongside foreign detainees who've been brought to this country to be processed. No one is charged. No one is identified. No international monitors are allowed into the US jails. People who have been arrested say they've been brutalised - the tactics used are beyond belief."

According to the National Public Radio, Bidar was educated in Russia.

Bidar maintains extensive records of exit interviews he conducts with released prisoners, because American authorities will not allow him to interview captives currently in detention.
