= Matiullah Wesa =

Afghan education activist (born 1992)

- Born: 1992 (age 33–34); Maruf District, Kandahar, Afghanistan
- Organization: The Pen Path
- Known for: Education activism

Matiullah Wesa (born 1992) is an Afghan girl's education advocate and the founder of The Pen Path organisation.

== Early life and education ==
Wesa was born in 1992 and grew up in the Maruf District of Kandahar. Both his father and his grandfather were community elders and his father opened Marouf's first ever girls school in Kandahar2003.

In 2002, when he was aged nine, the Taliban burnt his school to the ground, prompting the family to relocate to Kabul. He completed his higher education B.A. Political Science university of Pune in India, Postgraduation in M.A. specializing in human rights Jamia Hamdard university New Delhi India.

== Advocacy ==
In 2009, Matiualla Wesa and his brother Attaullah Wesa founded The Pen Path volunteer organization and became one of the most notable activists for girls education in Afghanistan.

In 2014, they organized a book donation campaign by name of one Book for Peace drive to create 40 in rural areas all over Afghanistan. They start motor bike campaign traveled to 34 provinces and 352 districts. In 2017, they travelled around Afghanistan advocating for schools to reopen, girls education, peace message and human rights. They met with six million people around Afghanistan.

On 27 March 2023, the Taliban arrested Wesa in Kabul and raided his house. Hamid Karzai, the former president, expressed sadness at his arrest and called for his release. The United Nations called for clarification about the reasons for his arrest and for the sharing of information about his location.

On 26 October 2023, Wesa was released from a Taliban prison after seven months of incarceration.

== See also ==
- Education in Afghanistan
- Women in Afghanistan
