= Gerardo Galeote Quecedo =

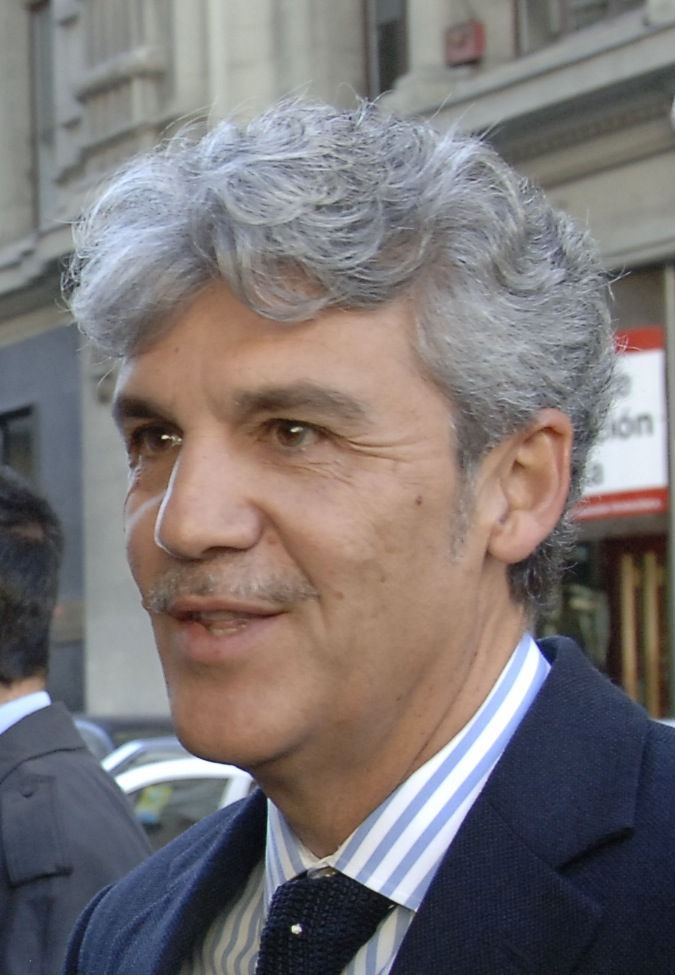
Gerardo Galeote, EPP CONVENTION ON CLIMATE CHANGE IN MADRID (6-7 FEBRUARY 2008)

Gerardo Galeote Quecedo (born January 27, 1957, in São Paulo, Brazil) is a lawyer and former Spanish Member of the European Parliament from 1994 to 2009. He was elected on the People's Party ticket and sat with the European People's Party group. He was also the party spokesman.

On July 23, 2004, he was elected Chair of the Committee on Regional Development.

In April 2009, Galeote announced that he would not stand for reelection to the European Parliament in the June 2009 elections. It was believed that following the opening of an investigation by Judge Baltasar Garzón into allegations that Galeote had received more than 600,000 euros as a result of corrupt dealings involving companies operated by Francisco Correa Sánchez, the Socialist Party would use Galeote as a focus of their electoral campaign against the Partido Popular. Gerardo Galeote was never accused and was left out of the investigation from Gurtel, however the press around the case, caused irreparable damage to his career. From 2009 to 2014 he was an Advisor to the president Mariano Rajoy. He left the party and his career in politics in 2014.
