= Alexander Nuno Alvaro =

German politician and was a Member of the European Parliament (born 1975)

Alexander Alvaro
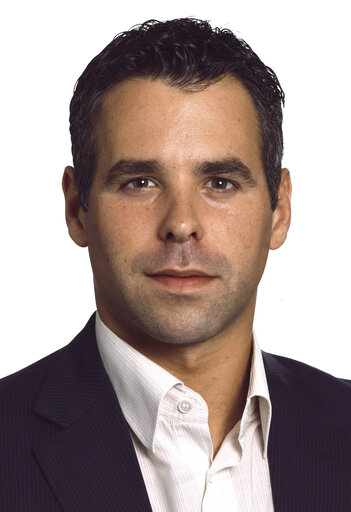

Member of the European Parliament
- In office 2004–2014

Personal details
- Born: 26 May 1975 (age 51) Bonn-Bad Godesberg, Northrhine-Westphalia, West Germany
- Party: Free Democratic Party of Germany
- Education: University of Mannheim
- Profession: Lawyer

Alexander Nuno Alvaro (born 26 May 1975) is a German politician and was a Member of the European Parliament (MEP) with the Free Democratic Party of Germany, which is part of the Alliance of Liberals and Democrats for Europe. During his first mandate he worked in the European Parliament's Committee on Civil Liberties, Justice and Home Affairs; he was a substitute for the Committee on Legal Affairs, a member of the Delegation for relations with the Palestinian Legislative Council and a substitute for the delegation for relations with Australia and New Zealand.

During his second mandate, he became Vice-President of the Committee on Budgets, member of the Committee on Civil Liberties, Justice and Home Affairs, of the Special committee on the policy challenges and budgetary resources for a sustainable European Union after 2013, and of the Delegation for relations with Iran and Spokesman of the ALDE group for Home Affairs.

Alvaro was also involved in many European dossiers and campaigns, initiating the Oneseat campaign (Oneseat.eu) with Swedish Minister for European affairs and ex-MEP Cecilia Malmström, dealing with the American Government on the Swift International EU-US Treaty, and defending civil liberties on legislative projects such as ACTA.

On 22 February 2013, Alvaro was involved in a car crash in which the vehicle Alvaro was driving struck another car. Alvaro was badly injured and the driver in the other vehicle was killed though it is not known if he had already died before due to an accident which happened before. Two more passengers in the other car were badly injured. Alvaro spent time in a coma, was hospitalised for several months and returned to Parliament in September.

He was founder and board member of EU40 www.eu40.eu, the associations of MEPs and EU officials under the age of 40, aiming at enhancing trans-partisan generation-based EU policies. Alvaro stood down in 2014, choosing not to stand in the 2014 European Parliament election.

== Education ==
- 1997: Qualification in banking. Graduated from Universities of Bremen, Mannheim, Lausanne and Düsseldorf.
- 2004: State law examination
- 2004-2009 first mandate in the European Parliament
- 2009-2014 second mandate in the European Parliament

== Career ==
- 2002–2005: Deputy Federal Chairman of the Young Liberals
- since 2003: Member of the Federal Executive of the FDP
