= Service Regulation =

Regulation (EC) No 1393/2007
- European Union regulation
- Title: Regulation on the service in the Member States of judicial and extrajudicial documents in civil or commercial matters (service of documents), and repealing Council Regulation (EC) No 1348/2000
- Applicability: All EU countries except Denmark
- Made by: European Parliament and of the Council
- Made under: Article 61(c) and Article 67(5) of the TEC
- Journal reference: OJ L 324, 10 December 2007, p. 79–120

History
- Date made: 13 November 2007
- Entry into force: 13 November 2008

Regulation (EC) No 1348/2000
- European Union regulation
- Title: Council Regulation on jurisdiction and the recognition and enforcement of judgments in civil and commercial matters
- Applicability: All EU countries except Denmark
- Made by: Council
- Made under: Article 61(c) and Article 67(1) TEC
- Journal reference: OJ L 160, 30 June 2000, pp. 37–52

History
- Date made: 29 May 2000
- Entry into force: 31 March 2001

Other legislation
- Replaced by: Council Regulation (EC) No. 1393/2007

The Service Regulation, officially the Council Regulation (EC) No. 1393/2007 on the service in the Member States of judicial and extrajudicial documents in civil or commercial matters, is a European Union regulation in the field of judicial cooperation. It allows service of judicial documents from one member state to another without recourse to consular and diplomatic channels.

Service of process in civil cases prior to the regulation was done by either under the Hague Service Convention or by means of a letter rogatory (also called a letter of request), a formal request from a court in one country to serve process to another in which the defendant is domiciled. This formal document usually required transmission from the originating Court to the Ministry of Foreign Affairs (MFA) in the state of origin, who then forwarded it, possibly through various embassies, to the MFA in the destination state. The foreign MFA would then pass the documents to the judicial authorities in that state, who would then go about the service procedures. Proof of service would then be returned via the same long winded channels.

This regulation enables a somewhat simplified route by establishing transmitting and receiving agencies in each of the member states. Some member states have a de-centralised system with many transmitting and receiving agencies, whereas others have a single centralised agency. The transmitting agency in one member state sends the judicial documents to the receiving agency who is then responsible for service. A Letter Rogatory is not necessary, as a standardised request form included in the annex to the regulation must be used. This aids the process by being widely recognised by the relevant authorities. In addition to service through the recipient member state's receiving agency or agencies, Article 14 of the regulation permits service on defendants directly by mail. Article 15 of the regulation allows for "direct service" through competent judicial officials in the member state, although some member states have opted out of that article.

The member states of the European Union originally conclude a convention amongst themselves on the service of documents, which was signed on 26 May 1997 but never entered into force as it was ratified only by Spain. The substance of this convention was replaced by Regulation 1348/2000. The regulation applied to all the member states of the European Union with the exception of Denmark, however by virtue of a bilateral agreement the provisions of the regulation were extended to Denmark. The 2000 regulation was subsequently replaced by the 2007 regulation. Denmark informed the Commission of its acceptance of the recast Decision.

== Receiving agencies by Member State ==
- Austria — decentralised — all Bezirksgerichts (district courts)
- Belgium — decentralised — all huissiers de justice (bailiffs)
- Cyprus — centralised — Ministry of Justice and Public Order
- Czech Republic — decentralised — all Městský soud (district courts)
- Denmark — not subject to the regulation
- Estonia — centralised — Justiitsministeerium (Ministry of Justice)
- Finland — decentralised — all Käräjäoikeus / Tingsrätt (district courts)
- France — centralised — Chambre Nationale des Huissiers de Justice (National Association of Bailiffs)
- Germany — decentralised — all Amtsgerichts
- Greece — centralised — Ministry of Justice
- Hungary — centralised — Ministry of Justice
- Ireland — centralised — EU Documents Unit, Courts Service Centralised Office, Combined Court Office
- Italy — centralised — the Ufficio Unico degli Ufficiali Giudiziari in Rome (Central Office of Bailiffs)
- Latvia — centralised — Latvijas Republikas Tieslietu ministrija (Ministry of Justice)
- Lithuania — centralised — Lietuvos antstolių rūmai (Chamber of Judicial Officers of Lithuania)
- Luxembourg — decentralised — all huissiers de justice
- Malta — centralised — Attorney General's office
- Netherlands — decentralised — all gerechtsdeurwaarders (bailiffs)
- Poland — decentralised — all sąd rejonowy (district courts)
- Portugal — decentralised — all tribunal da comarca (district courts)
- Slovakia — Ministerstvo spravodlivosti Slovenskej republiky (Ministry of Justice)
- Slovenia — decentralised — all Okrožno sodišče (district courts)
- Spain — decentralised — all juzgados de primera instancia (courts of first instance)
- Sweden — centralised — Ministry of Justice
- United Kingdom

England and Wales — centralised — the Senior Master
Northern Ireland — centralised — the Master of the High Court
Scotland — decentralised — Messengers-at-arms and Solicitors

== Case law ==
On 9 February 2006, the European Court of Justice handed down a ruling in the case of Plumex v Young Sports NV referred to it by the Hof van Cassatie in Belgium. Plumex (a Portuguese company) had been served with Belgian court proceedings under the regulation in two methods, once through the receiving agencies in Portugal, and once by post. Plumex appealed a judgment obtained by the plaintiffs to the Hof van Beroep claiming that procedural time limits should only run from the date of service under Articles 4 to 11, and not the date of service by post which had occurred earlier.

The Hof van Beroep then dismissed Plumex's appeal, and the company subsequently appealed the decision in the Hof van Cassatie. The higher Court referred the decision as a matter of community law to the ECJ.

The ECJ's judgment was essentially that no hierarchy of methods of service existed between the different methods of service allowed under the regulation, and that the time limit must logically run from the first date of service regardless of which method has been employed.
