= Courts of Ontario =

System of courts in Ontario, Canada

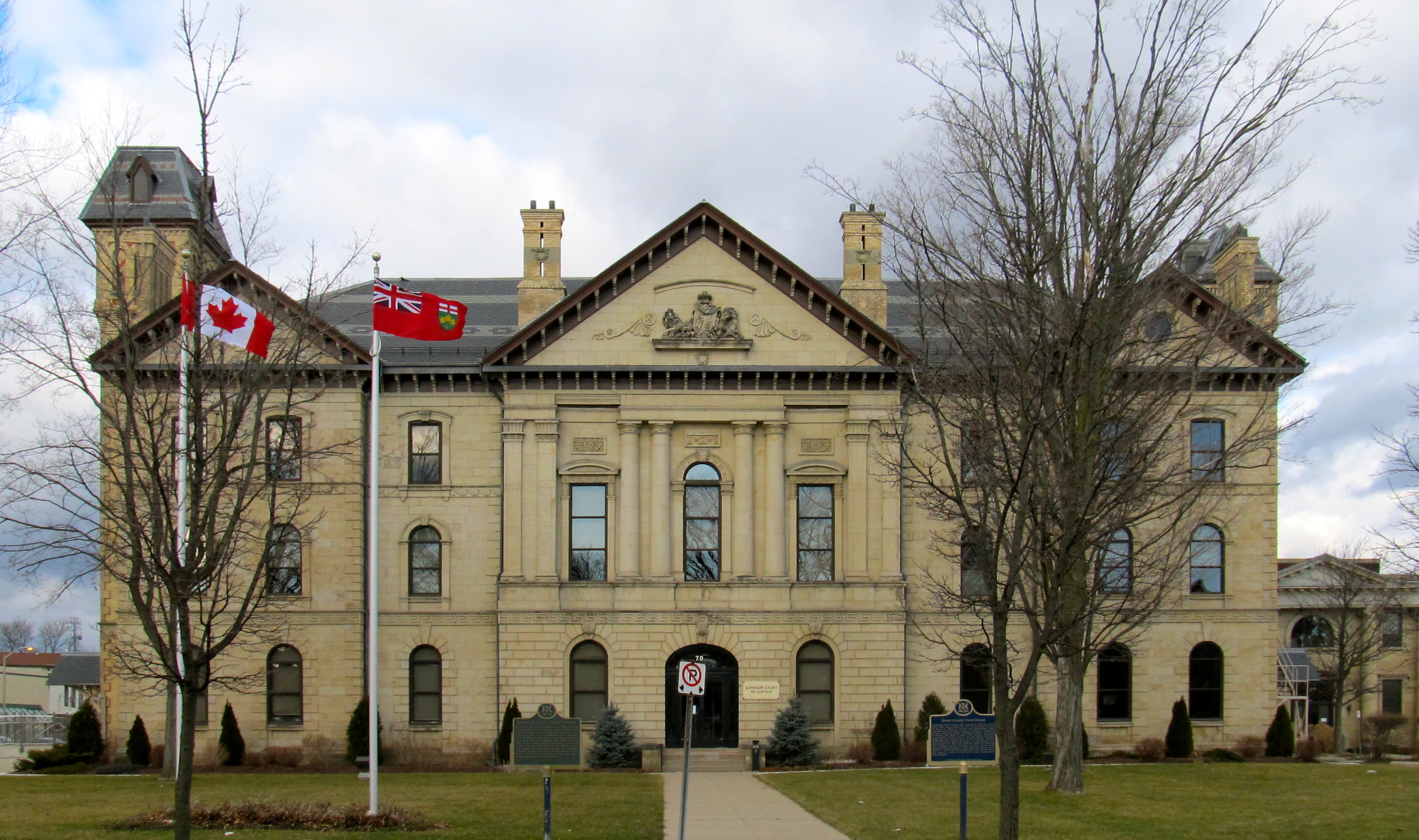
Brant County Court House in Brantford, 2011

Accounts of the Indigenous law governing dispute resolution in the area now called Ontario, Canada, date from the early to mid-17th century. French civil law courts were created in Canada, the colony of New France, in the 17th century, and common law courts were first established in 1764. The territory was then known as the province of Quebec.

A portion of the province of Quebec was designated Upper Canada by the Constitutional Act 1791. Almost immediately after the colony was created, Upper Canada's colonial government abolished the French civil law and established English common law courts in private law matters. The union of the Canadas had little effect on the court system in what became Canada West. Periodic reform continued in the region's courts before and after Canada West was renamed Ontario upon Confederation in 1867.

Ontario's courts were reformed and reorganized on several occasions in the 19th century. Major changes included the creation of the Court of Chancery of Upper Canada, a court of equity, in 1837, and the fusion of common law and equity in 1881. Periodic reform continued in the 20th century. In 1972, Ontario acquired another new court, the Divisional Court. Its courts' current names and roles were largely settled by the 1990s.

== Indigenous law ==
Evidence of human activity in what is now Ontario dates to approximately 9000 BCE. Summarizing the Indigenous approach to dispute resolution, with particular reference to the Mohawk people, the authors of A History of Law in Canada, volume 1, explain that, "All important matters had to be discussed openly, though after consultation some final council deliberations could occur in secret, at least among the Mohawk. Councils of elders consulted broadly before making decisions, and their authority usually rested on understanding 'public opinion,' while that of chiefs rested on the power of persuasion."

In Anishinaabe law, governance and dispute resolution occur at councils and council fires. Historian Heidi Bohaker describes a distinction Peter Jones drew between common councils, where people could resolve disputes and adopt and modify legal rules within a given territory; and general councils, where leaders of common councils would go to form and renew alliances between territories. Both forms of council were "consensus-based deliberative bodies that were expected to receive and consider advice from the people they represented". Jones wrote in the early 19th century, but Bohaker notes that the council structure was much older—dating at least from the early to mid-17th century.

In Haudenosaunee law, the Great Law of Peace governs dispute resolution, emphasizing, among other things, that matters that may result in disputes should be discussed and negotiated before they become disputes proper.

== Canada (New France) (1608–1763) ==
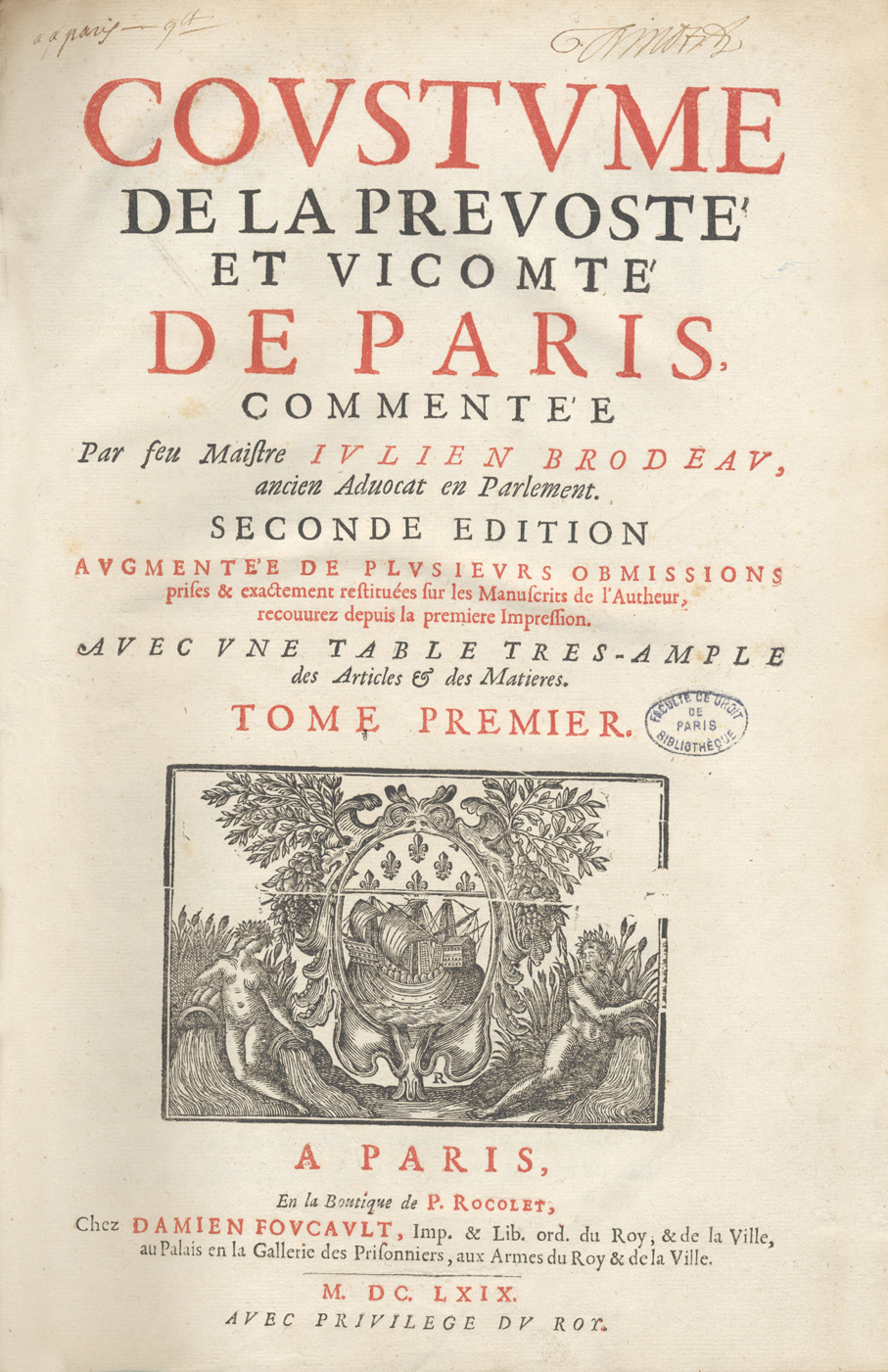
Cover page of an edition of the coutume de Paris, 1669

Between the first French settlement at Quebec City in 1608 and the conquest of New France in 1758–60, the French colony of Canada followed the coutume de Paris, a codified version of French customary law; and French statute law. From 1608, Quebec's governor-general was in effect legislator and judge, since he held responsibility for making civil and criminal law and adjudicating cases. Seigneuries also held manorial courts with jurisdiction within the seigneur's land grant. In 1651, Governor Jean de Lauson created the sénéchaussée, a court at Quebec City with both trial and appellate jurisdiction. New France became a French crown colony in 1663 and the new colonial administrators were keen to reform its legal system. From that date, the colony's sovereign council held "broad and unified legislative, executive, financial, and judicial powers".

According to Edmond Lareau, justice in early New France was dispensed "more or less arbitrarily by the governor", since the sénéchal—from whose name the sénéchaussée was taken—was appointed by, and answered to, the governor. In important matters, the sénéchal adjudicated matters in a council with the Jesuit superior and "notable city residents".

== Quebec (1763–1791) ==
In 1763, James Murray was empowered, by a letter from George III, as the captain-general and governor-in-chief of the province of Quebec, to create courts of civil and criminal jurisdiction within the province. Accordingly, on 17 September 1764, Murray established a Court of King's Bench for the province with jurisdiction in all civil and criminal cases. Appeals lay from his decisions to the provincial cabinet in cases where the amount in dispute was over £300. Where the amount in dispute was over £500, an appeal lay from cabinet to the Privy Council.

At the same time, the Court of Common Pleas was established, with civil jurisdiction in cases above £10. In cases above £20, an appeal lay to the Court of King's Bench; in cases over £300 to the provincial cabinet, with a further appeal to the Privy Council in cases over £600. The Court of Common Pleass had three judges and sat at Quebec City and Montreal. The province was divided into two judicial districts by the Godefroy and Saint-Maurice rivers, and courts of quarter sessions were formed for these districts, to sit at Quebec City and Montreal every three months.

In the Court of King's Bench, all cases were to be decided "agreeable to the laws of England and to the ordinances of [the] province". In the Court of Common Pleas the judges were "to determine according to equity haying regard nevertheless to the law of England as far as the circumstances and present situation of things will admit". In criminal cases, the existing criminal law of England governed.

In 1770, Governor Guy Carleton, 1st Baron Dorchester, abolished the civil jurisdiction of the justices of the peace and directed all cases not exceeding £12 to be tried by the judges of the Courts of Common Pleas. The former Court of Common Pleas had sat both in Quebec and in Montreal, but now there were to be two independent courts: one in Quebec, the other in Montreal, limited in jurisdiction to their own districts. On 3 January 1775, Lord Dorchester was instructed to create a Court of King's Bench for the province for criminal cases; and, dividing the province into two districts, to establish a Court of Common Pleas for each district with jurisdiction over all civil cases that would be "cognizable by the Court of Common Pleas in Westminster Hall".

The Treaty of Paris brought a large number of immigrants from the American colonies. This increase in population increased the demand for courts. In 1788, Lord Dorchester addressed this problem by dividing the province of Quebec into four judicial districts: Luneburg "to the mouth of the River Gananoque", Mecklenburg to the Trent River, Nassau "to the extreme projection of Long Point into the Lake Erie", and Hesse west of Nassau. In each of these districts, a court of common pleas was established, with unlimited civil jurisdiction; and a court of quarter sessions, which handled "local government and criminal matters". The first Upper Canada legislature renamed them the "Eastern", "Midland", "Home", and "Western" districts, respectively.

The courts of common pleas and quarter sessions were overseen mainly by judges without legal training. Common pleas judges modified the common law received from England to reduce some of the technicalities associated with the forms of action. They avoided using technical Law Latin or Law French terms, such as assumpsit or trover, in favour of vernacular terminology. As compared to its English counterpart, civil procedure in the common pleas was "relatively simple and informal".

== Upper Canada (1791–1840) ==
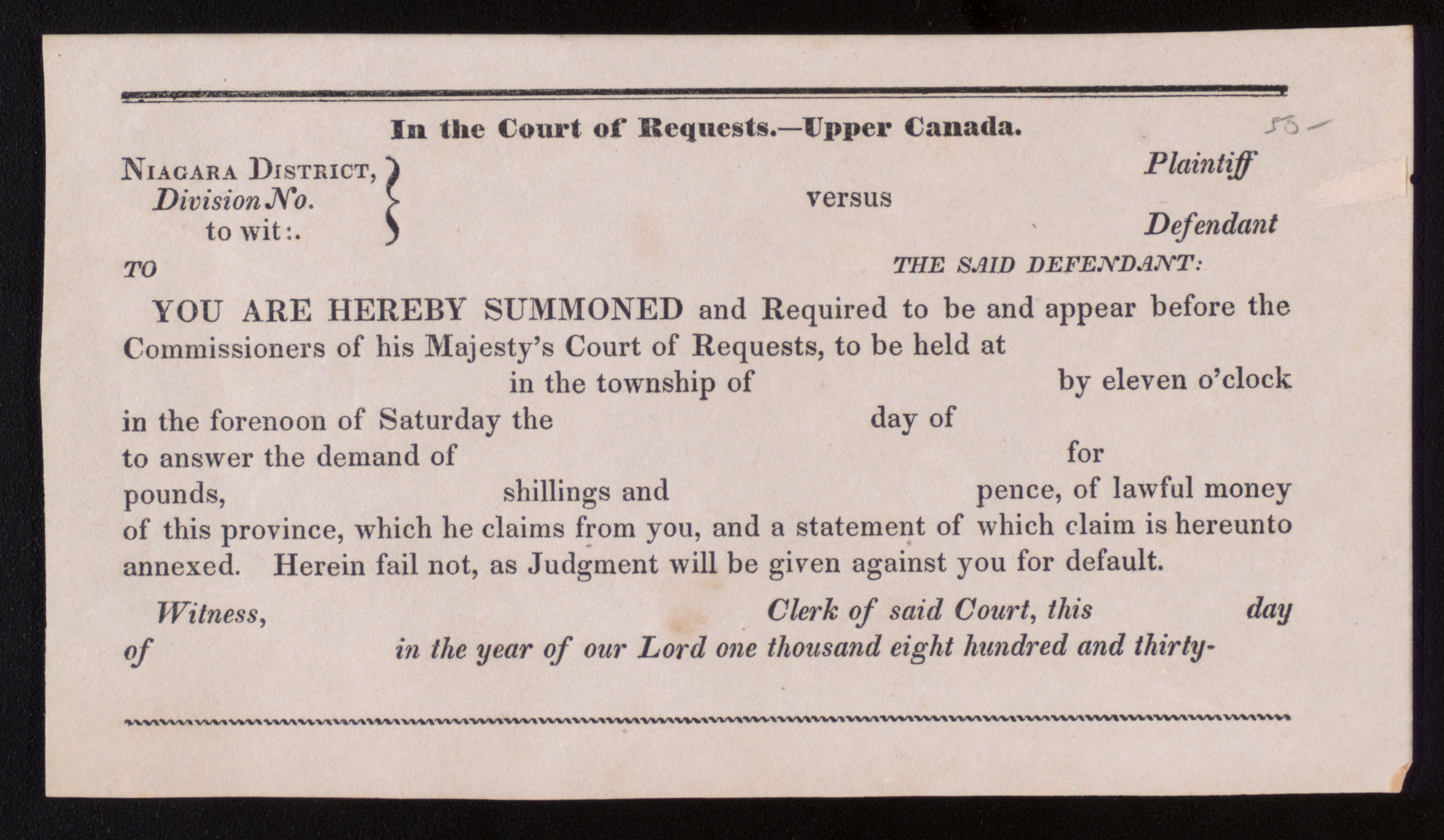
Form of a summons to the court of requests, 1830

Upper Canadians were largely United Empire Loyalists who found the French civil law "alien". Accordingly, the first statute of the legislature of Upper Canada abolished the coutume de Paris, a body of civil law that had governed non-criminal matters in the province of Quebec before the Constitutional Act 1791. The second statute required jury trial in civil matters; juries were already required in civil trials.

According to historian William N. T. Wylie, the two principal figures in the design of Upper Canada's court system were William Osgoode, who became chief justice of Upper, then Lower, Canada; and Lieutenant-Governor John Graves Simcoe. Osgoode and Simcoe aimed to create an Upper Canadian legal system that was centralized, professionalized, and based in the English common law.

The courts of common pleas were gradually abolished between 1792 and 1794. In 1794, pursuant to the Judicature Act, 1794, the Court of King's Bench was created for the province. The Court of King's Bench, a superior court, was given the powers of the courts of King's Bench, Common Pleas, and Exchequer in England, and had as judges the chief justice of the province and two puisne justices. These three judges were appointed by the imperial Colonial Office and were given substantial salaries.

The Court of King's Bench took up most of the actions that would previously have gone to the courts of common pleas, except actions for small amounts of money (no more than £15, later increased to £40 in some circumstances). Actions between £2 and £15 were heard by District Courts, which sat in each of the province's four judicial districts. By contrast with King's Bench judges, District Court judges were appointed by provincial officials and the posts were not salaried. Their compensation came only from court usage fees.

Judges of the Court of King's Bench went on circuit throughout the province's four judicial districts in meetings termed assizes. The assizes handled civil and criminal matters, conducting civil nisi prius trials and acting as courts of oyer and terminer and general jail delivery (clearing out of prisoners). Assizes initially met only once a year; they became biannual in 1837. Decisions at the assizes could be appealed to a full panel of the Court of King's Bench, sitting at York (which became Toronto).

Upper Canada's court of quarter sessions, officially the General Sessions of the Peace, handled some "less serious cases" that were not dealt with at the assizes. Finally, the courts of requests, presided over by justices of the peace, met every other Saturday to handle small claims. (A "small claim", in early Upper Canada, was a claim for less than £2.) Their jurisdiction was limited to portions of each of the four judicial districts. The courts of requests were abolished in 1841.

The Court of King's Bench only had common law jurisdiction. The lack of an equity court in Upper Canada, and the consequent absence of equitable remedies in the law of property, made it difficult for creditors to foreclose on mortgaged property and prevented debtors from exercising the right of equity of redemption. Without these remedies, property held as collateral for a loan was often seized by the local sheriff, pursuant to a writ of fieri facias, if a borrower defaulted—and sold at auction for rock-bottom prices.

Equity was not officially introduced into the law of Upper Canada until 1837, when the Court of Chancery of Upper Canada was created. William Renwick Riddell called that year an "annus mirabilis" for Ontario's court system.

Officials of the justice system in Upper Canada, including judges, sheriffs, and magistrates, were appointed by colonial administrators and could be dismissed at will. Historian David Murray describes them as "in every sense royal officials". They were not selected primarily for legal expertise or competence, but rather for wealth and loyalty to the British Crown. Thus, there was no judicial independence in early Upper Canada: judges could be dismissed by administrative fiat. This, among other factors, led to calls from William Warren Baldwin and others for responsible government, whereby ministers and other officials would be answerable to an elected legislature, as opposed to imperial superiors in London. London did not initially grant responsible government to Upper Canada, but it did increase judicial job security. As of 1834, judges of the Court of King's Bench held office on good behaviour.

== Canada West (1840–1867) ==
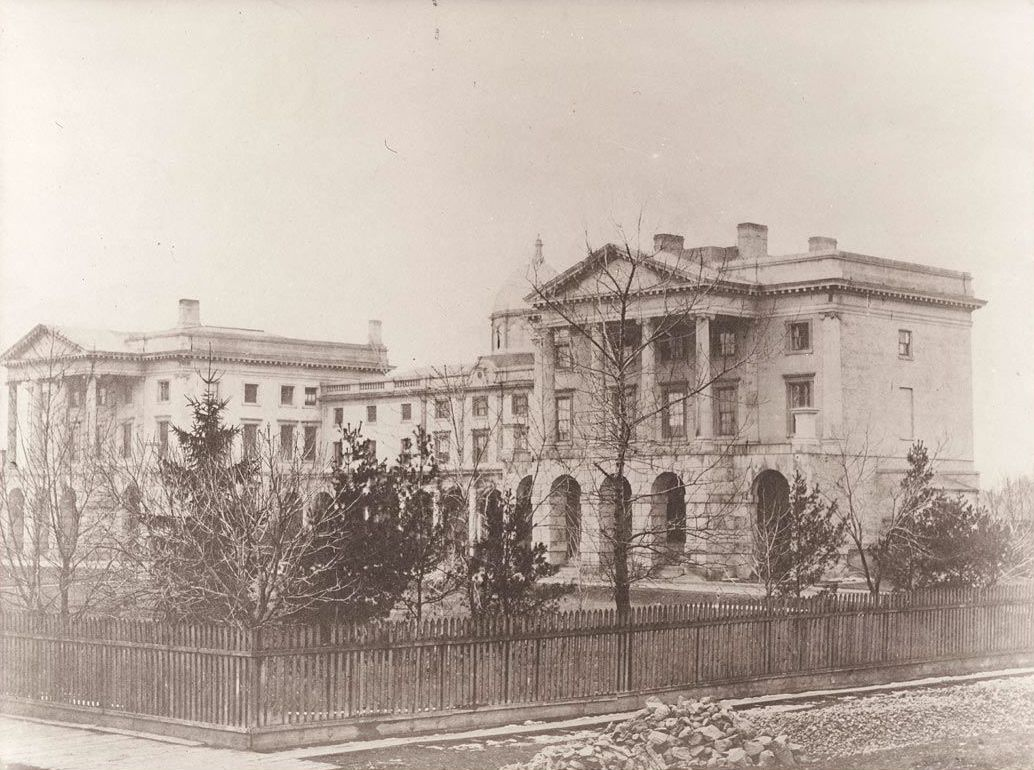
Osgoode Hall in 1856

The union of Upper Canada and Lower Canada into the province of Canada, pursuant to the Act of Union 1840, had little effect on the administration of justice in what was now termed Canada West. Canada East (formerly Lower Canada, now Quebec) and Canada West (formerly Upper Canada, now Ontario) had different courts, attorneys general, and solicitors general, as they had before union.

In 1849, a new court, the Court of Common Pleas, came into existence, presided over by a chief justice and two puisne justices and with the same powers and jurisdiction as the Court of King's (now Queen's) Bench, while the number of puisne justices in the Queen's Bench was reduced to two. A second statute, passed at the same time, created the Court of Chancery of Upper Canada, for which the province's governor was the chancellor and a judge was to be appointed "the vice chancellor of Upper Canada". This was not found wholly satisfactory and accordingly the 1849 statute reconstituted the court with a chancellor and two vice chancellors.

Finally, again in 1849, Ontario's system of county courts was created. The county courts replaced an analogous system of district courts, which operated from 1794 to 1849. This change was presumably due in part to the fact that the old system of judicial districts—which, with increases in population since they were established, had now grown from four to twenty districts—was abolished by statute in 1849. By that time, as the act abolishing the districts itself noted, the "boundaries" of districts "[had], in many cases, become identical with the boundaries of counties". The courts of Queen's Bench, Common Pleas, and Chancery continued in existence as separate courts, the two former as courts of common law, the last as a court of equity, until 1881.

The 1849 statute abolished the court of appeal and established the Court of Error and Appeal to hear appeals from both the two common law courts and the court of chancery. This new court was composed of the judges of the three courts, like the Court of Exchequer Chamber in England. The Court of Error and Appeal first sat at Osgoode Hall on 8 March 1850. Christopher Moore describes it as "the first independent and professional court of appeal for the future Ontario". Before this court was established, the final appeal of a decision within soon-to-be Ontario (some decisions could be appealed to the Privy Council) lay to the province's executive council; thus, executive and judicial functions were fused, in a manner typical in the common law world at the time. In 1874, the Court of Error and Appeal was reconstituted and thereafter consisted of five judges who had no other duties than to sit as judges of the Court of Appeal. Its name was changed to the Court of Appeal in 1876.

== Ontario (1867–present) ==
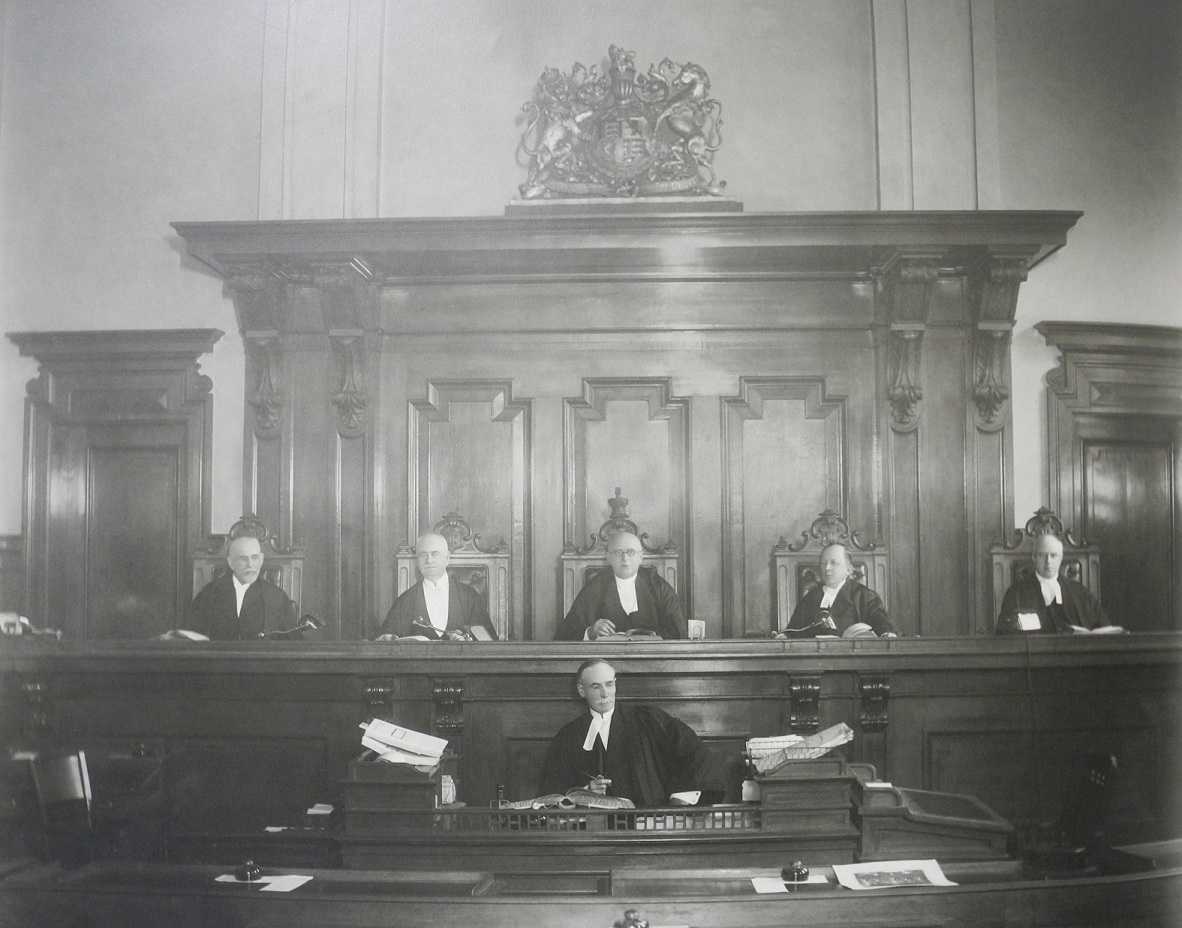
Justices of the Supreme Court of Ontario, 1925

In 1881 came the Judicature Act, 1881, which was modelled after the English Judicature Acts. It came into force on 22 August 1881. Historian Margaret A. Banks describes this statute as "a landmark in the history of the Ontario courts", but notes that "it cannot be regarded as a sudden or unexpected development". The Judicature Act, 1881, abolished the distinction between law and equity, giving preference to the rules of equity. It united and continued the three courts of original jurisdiction (Queen's Bench, Chancery, and Common Pleas) and the Court of Appeal into a single Supreme Court of Judicature for Ontario, with two divisions: (1) the Court of Appeal, with five judges; and (2) the High Court of Justice, with twelve judges. Banks notes that the Supreme Court of Judicature, later simply the Supreme Court of Ontario, was "purely theoretical" in operation. That is, no court termed simply the "Supreme Court of Judicature" or the "Supreme Court of Ontario" adjudicated cases; rather, the "theoretical" court exercised jurisdiction only through its divisions.

Jurisdiction to consider reference questions was conferred on the Supreme Court of Judicature by statute in 1890.

By the Law Reform Act, 1909, which came into force on 1 January 1913, the Supreme Court of Judicature for Ontario became the Supreme Court of Ontario, with two branches: (1) the Appellate Division; and (2) the High Court Division. The former was only appellate while the latter was a court of original jurisdiction; however, any judge of the Supreme Court of Ontario could sit in any division or branch. The divisions of the High Court of Justice were abolished. The Appellate Division consisted of two divisional courts which had the same jurisdiction. The names of the Appellate Division and High Court Division were changed to "Court of Appeal for Ontario" (its current name) and "High Court of Justice for Ontario", respectively, in 1931.

Banks, referring to an unpublished paper by Horace Krever, a justice of the High Court of Justice and Court of Appeal for Ontario, says that "the structure of the Supreme Court of Ontario remained pretty much the same from 1931 until April 1972". On 17 April 1972, a 1970 statute came into force implementing the recommendation in the McRuer report (1968), a review of the Ontario court system, that the Divisional Court be created. The Divisional Court had then, and still has, a complex statutory appellate and judicial review jurisdiction.

The Courts of Justice Act, which presently constitutes Ontario's courts, was first enacted in 1984, replacing the Judicature Act. By a 1989 amendment to the Courts of Justice Act, Ontario's superior court, county courts, and district courts were consolidated into the Ontario Court (General Division), while the family and criminal courts formed the Ontario Court (Provincial Division). These names were changed to their current names—the Ontario Superior Court of Justice and Ontario Court of Justice, respectively—by section 8 of the Courts Improvement Act, 1996.

Special criminal courts for Indigenous offenders, known as Gladue courts following the decision of the Supreme Court of Canada in R v Gladue and sometimes as Indigenous persons courts, have existed in Ontario since 2001, when the first such court was established in Toronto. These courts apply the criminal law of Canada but follow different sentencing principles for Indigenous offenders. These principles emphasize alternatives to incarceration and the distinctive history of Indigenous peoples in Canada. Gladue courts do not conduct criminal trials, but may be involved in sentencing or bail hearings.

== See also ==
- Court system of Canada
- History of Ontario
- Law of Canada

== Sources ==
- Bakht, Natasha (June 2005). "Problem Solving Courts as Agents of Change". Criminal Law Quarterly. 50 (3): 224–254.
- Banks, Margaret A. (1983). "The Evolution of the Ontario Courts 1788–1981". In Flaherty, David H. (ed.). Essays in the History of Canadian Law. Vol. 2. University of Toronto Press. pp. 492–572. doi:10.3138/9781442662919-012. ISBN 978-1-4426-6291-9. JSTOR 10.3138/j.ctt13x1q47.
- Bohaker, Heidi (2020). Doodem and Council Fire: Anishinaabe Governance through Alliance. University of Toronto Press; Osgoode Society for Legal History. ISBN 978-1-4426-4731-2. OCLC 1146559929.
- Dickinson, John A. (1995). "New France: Law, Courts, and the Coutume de Paris, 1608–1760". Manitoba Law Journal. 23: 32–54. 1995 CanLIIDocs 131.
- Girard, Philip; Phillips, Jim; Brown, R. Blake (2018). A History of Law in Canada. Vol. 1. University of Toronto Press. ISBN 978-1-4875-3058-7. JSTOR 10.3138/j.ctv9hvr5n. OCLC 1079759516.
- Kinnear, Helen (1954). "The County Judge in Ontario". Canadian Bar Review. 32 (2): 127–160. 1954 CanLIIDocs 10.
- Lareau, Edmond (1888). Histoire du droit canadien (in French). Vol. 1. Montréal: Librairie générale de droit et de jurisprudence. OCLC 1046051134.
- Moore, Christopher (2014). The Court of Appeal for Ontario: Defining the Right of Appeal in Canada, 1792–2013. University of Toronto Press. doi:10.3138/9781442622470. ISBN 978-1-4426-2247-0. JSTOR 10.3138/j.ctt1287q35.
- Murray, David Robert (2002). Colonial Justice: Justice, Morality and Crime in the Niagara District, 1791–1849. University of Toronto Press; Osgoode Society for Canadian Legal History. ISBN 978-1-4426-2340-8. OCLC 903968111.
- Riddell, William Renwick (November 1913). "The Courts of Ontario". University of Pennsylvania Law Review and American Law Register. 62 (1): 17–33. doi:10.2307/3313260. JSTOR 3313260. This article incorporates text from this source, which is in the public domain.
- Riddell, William Renwick (1915). "The Early Courts of the Province". Canadian Law Times. 35: 879–890. This article incorporates text from this source, which is in the public domain.
- Romney, Paul (1995). "Upper Canada (Ontario): The Administration of Justice, 1784–1850". Manitoba Law Journal. 23: 183–213. 1995 CanLIIDocs 136.
- Williams, Kayanesenh Paul (2018). Kayanerenkó:wa: The Great Law of Peace. University of Manitoba Press. ISBN 978-0-88755-556-5. OCLC 1061095159.
- Wylie, William N.T. (1983). "Instruments of Commerce and Authority: The Civil Courts in Upper Canada 1789–1812". In Flaherty, David H. (ed.). Essays in the History of Canadian Law. Vol. 2. University of Toronto Press. pp. 1–48. doi:10.3138/9781442662919-004. ISBN 978-1-4426-6291-9.
