= High Court judge (England and Wales) =

Level of judge in England and Wales

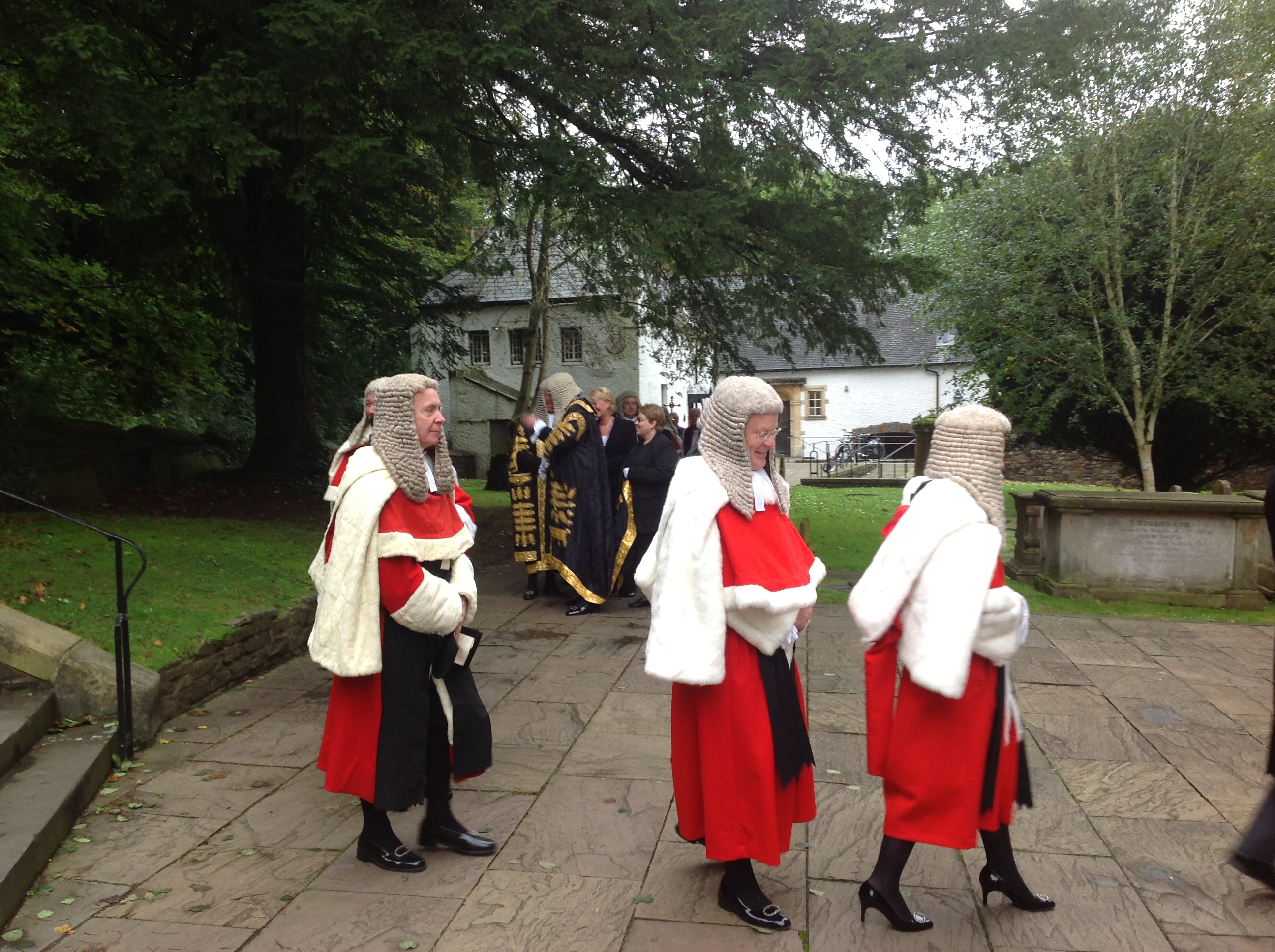
Red-robed High Court judges in procession at Llandaff Cathedral in 2013

A justice of the High Court, commonly known as a High Court judge, is a judge of the High Court of Justice of England and Wales, and represents the third-highest level of judge in the courts of England and Wales. High Court judges are referred to as puisne justices and wear red and black robes.

High Court judges do not include the ex officio judges of the High Court, such as the heads of the divisions. High Court judges rank below justices of appeal, but above circuit judges.

== Title and form of address ==
Upon appointment, male High Court judges are appointed Knights Bachelor and female judges made Dames Commander of the Order of the British Empire.

In court, a High Court judge is addressed as My Lord or Your Lordship if male, or as My Lady or Your Ladyship if female. High Court judges use the title in office of Mr Justice for men or, normally, Mrs Justice for women, even if unmarried. When Alison Russell was appointed in 2014, she took the title "Ms Justice Russell". The style of The Honourable (or The Hon) is also used during office. For example, Joseph Bloggs would be referred to as The Hon Mr Justice Bloggs Kt and Jane Bloggs DBE as The Hon Mrs Justice Bloggs DBE. When there is already or has until recently been a judge with the same (or a confusingly similar) surname as a new appointee, the new judge will often use a first name as part of their official title. Many judges have done this, such as Mr Justice Christopher Clarke (Sir Christopher Simon Courtenay Stephenson Clarke) and Mr Justice Roderick Evans (Sir David Roderick Evans).

When referring to a High Court judge in a legal context, the judge is identified by use of the surname (or first name and surname if appropriate), followed by the letter 'J'. For example, Mr Justice Bloggs or Mrs Justice Bloggs would be referred to as "Bloggs J". When two or more judges are listed the letters 'JJ' are used; for example, "Bloggs, Smith and Jones JJ".

== Appointment ==
Judges of the High Court were appointed in 1875 on the formation of the High Court of Justice. In 1877, they were formally renamed justices of the High Court. High Court judges are appointed by the monarch on the advice of the lord chancellor. Under the Constitutional Reform Act 2005, the Judicial Appointments Commission has removed the appointment of judges from the overtly political arena. High Court judges, like other judges, are appointed on open competition.

High Court judges, like all judges in England and Wales, hold office during good behaviour; this is laid down in the Act of Settlement 1701. This gives them greater security of tenure than if they held office during His or Her Majesty's pleasure, and is designed to protect their independence. A High Court judge can be removed only by the King upon an Address of both Houses of Parliament.

Formerly, High Court judges could be appointed only from among barristers of at least 10 years' standing. Before the qualifications changed, a typical appointee had in the region of twenty to thirty years' experience as a lawyer. Only four solicitors had been appointed as puisne judges: Michael Sachs in 1993, Lawrence Collins in 2000, Henry Hodge in 2004, and Gary Hickinbottom in 2008. Collins was elevated further to the Court of Appeal in 2007 and became a law lord in 2009. Occasionally more junior members of the judiciary are elevated to that rank, such as Mr Justice Crane, who was formerly a Circuit Judge, and Mrs Justice Butler-Sloss (now Baroness Butler-Sloss) who was previously a registrar in the Principal Registry of the Family Division of the High Court. A few distinguished academics have also made it onto the High Court bench, including Mrs Justice Hale (now Baroness Hale of Richmond) and, more recently, Mr Justice Beatson. In 2004, calls for increased diversity among the judiciary were recognised and the qualification period was changed so that, as of 21 July 2008, a potential High Court judge must satisfy the judicial-appointment eligibility condition on a seven-year basis.

While High Court judges all have the same jurisdiction, an appointee is allocated to one of the High Court's three divisions: the Chancery Division, the King's Bench Division and the Family Division. Judges can be transferred from one division to another by the Lord Chancellor.

== Remuneration ==
Their salary was initially fixed at £5,000 in 1875, which was increased to £8,000 only in 1954. A pension of £3,500 was first fixed in 1875.

As of 2019, puisne judges of the High Court received a salary of £185,197 per year; the chancellor of the High Court received £221,757 per year.

== See also ==
- List of High Court Judges of England and Wales
- Judicial titles in England and Wales
