= Lareau =

Lareau is a Canadian French surname. It may refer to:

== People ==
- Annette Lareau, an American professor and sociologist
- Edmond Lareau (1848–1890), a Canadian lawyer, author, journalist and political figure
- Sébastien Lareau (born 1973), a Canadian tennis player
