= Flavien-Guillaume Bouthillier =

Canadian politician

Member of the Legislative Assembly of Quebec for Rouville
- In office 1879–1881
- Preceded by: Solime Bertrand
- Succeeded by: Étienne Poulin

Personal details
- Born: March 2, 1844 Saint-Césaire, Canada East
- Died: July 20, 1907 (aged 63) Marieville, Quebec
- Party: Liberal

Flavien-Guillaume Bouthillier (March 2, 1844 – July 20, 1907) was a lawyer and political figure in Quebec. He represented Rouville in the Legislative Assembly of Quebec from 1879 to 1881 as a Liberal.

He was born in Saint-Césaire, Canada East, the son of Flavien Bouthillier and Marguerite-Henriette Blumhart, and was educated at the Collège de Sainte-Marie-de-Monnoir, the Collège de Saint-Hyacinthe, the Université Laval and Victoria University in Cobourg, Ontario. He articled in law with Antoine-Aimé Dorion, was admitted to the Quebec bar in 1871 and set up practice in Montreal, first on his own and later with Philippe-Honoré Roy. Bouthillier was a promoter of the St. Lawrence, Lower Laurentian & Saguenay Railroad. He was defeated by Victor Robert when he first ran for a seat in the Quebec assembly in 1875. Bouthillier was elected in an 1879 by-election held after Solime Bertrand's election in 1878 was appealed. He was defeated when he ran for reelection in 1881. From 1902 to 1907, he was customs inspector at Marieville. He died there at the age of 63.
