= Suitable age and discretion =

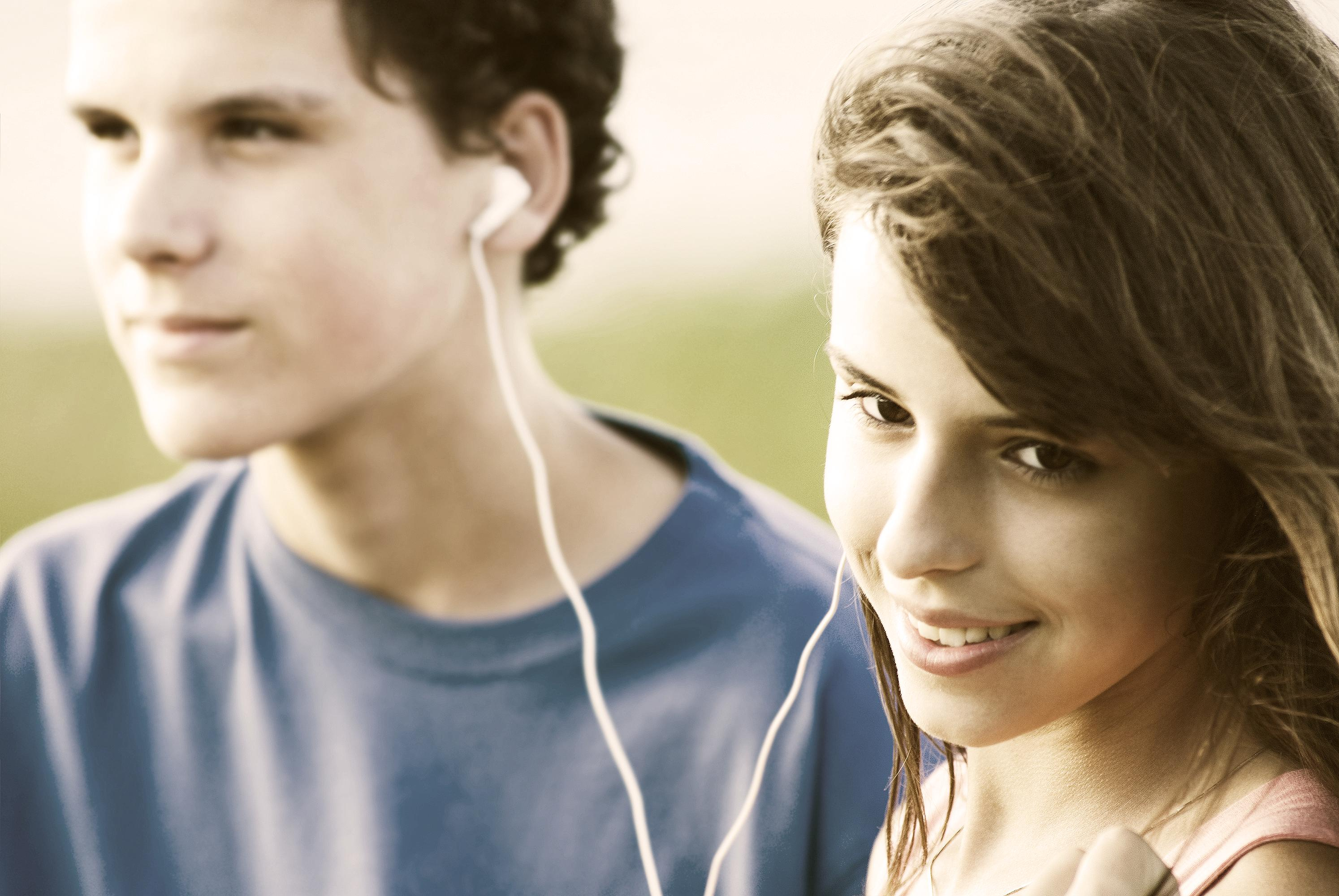
Two adolescents listening to music using earphones

Suitable age and discretion is both a legal definition of maturity (and by contrast immaturity), and an alternate method of service of process by which a process server can leave a summons, subpoena, or complaint with a person living at the residence of the defendant.

== Definitions ==
=== Minimum age ===
The age that adolescents gain legal rights and privileges vary. Generally, those who reach the age of 18 are legally considered to have reached the age of majority, but persons below that age may gain adult rights through legal emancipation. The legal working age in Western countries is usually between 14 and 16, depending on the hours and type of employment. This may be different from the minimum school leaving age (at which a person is legally allowed to leave compulsory education) and the age of consent to sexual activity varies widely between jurisdictions, ranging from 13 to 18 years.

The minimum age for "suitable age and discretion" varies by jurisdiction.

Fourteen years old seems to be the absolute minimum. Under "common law, a female of the age of 14 is at the age of legal discretion, and may choose a guardian." Thus, Minnesota declared 14 to be old enough to be presumed to be of suitable age and discretion. Under the laws of some states, including New York, a child of 14 can get married with permission of a court and a guardian, and marriages of those younger than that are void. A New York official court video transcript states:

The words suitable age and discretion usually mean having someone served at one of those locations who is over the age of 14, and is likely to give the papers to the person intended to be served.

— New York Unified Court System, Personal Service of Court Papers Video Transcript

In California, "an intelligent and mature 16-year-old" is of "suitable age and discretion".

=== Service of process ===
Suitable age and discretion is also an alternate method of service of process. Typically that means a child of the defendant, even if the child is only visiting his or her parents’ house, can accept service of process.

However, service on the receptionist at the former dwelling place of the defendant was not sufficient for personal jurisdiction.

==== Jurisdictions that recognize suitable age and discretion for service of process ====
In the United States, this form of process is recognized by Arizona, California, Louisiana, and Michigan. It is also recognized in Minnesota, New York, and North Carolina. The Federal Rules of Civil Procedure, Rule 4(e)(2)(B), allows "delivering a copy of the summons and of the complaint to the individual personally or by leaving copies thereof at the individual's dwelling house or usual place of abode with some person of suitable age and discretion then residing therein ...."

Suitable age and discretion service of process is recognized by Philippine law.

== See also ==
- Competence (law)
