= Alfred Girard =

Canadian politician

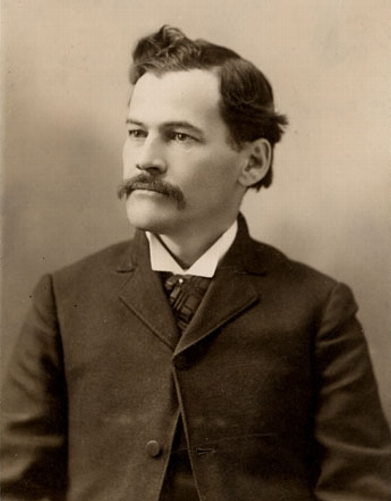

Member of the Legislative Assembly of Quebec for Rouville
- In office 1890–1897
- Preceded by: Edmond Lareau
- Succeeded by: Alexandre-Napoléon Dufresne
- In office 1900–1908
- Preceded by: Alexandre-Napoléon Dufresne
- Succeeded by: Joseph-Edmond Robert

Personal details
- Born: August 4, 1859 Sainte-Marie-de-Monnoir, Canada East
- Died: February 17, 1919 (aged 59) Montreal, Quebec, Canada
- Party: Liberal

Alfred Girard, KC (August 4, 1859 – February 17, 1919) was a Canadian lawyer and politician.

Born in Sainte-Marie-de-Monnoir, Canada East, the son of Pierre Girard and Marie Pelletier, Girard began his education at Marieville College, and afterwards passed a course in Sherbrooke College, finally graduating in law at McGill College in 1882, when he received his B.C.L. He was called to the Quebec Bar in 1882 and began practicing law in Marieville, Quebec. He eventually moved to Montreal where he practiced law. He was created a King's Counsel in 1903.

He was elected to the Legislative Assembly of Quebec in the 1890 election for the riding of Rouville. A Liberal, he was re-elected in 1892 but was defeated in 1897. He was re-elected again in 1900, acclaimed in 1904, and re-elected in 1908. He resigned in 1908 after being appointed to the Montreal Superior Court.
