= Joseph-Edmond Robert =

Canadian politician

Joseph-Edmond Robert (November 16, 1864 – February 26, 1949) was a farmer and political figure in Quebec. He represented Rouville in the Legislative Assembly of Quebec from 1908 to 1922 as a Liberal member.

He was born in Marieville, Canada East, the son of Victor Robert and Euphrasie Désautels. He was educated at the Collège Sainte-Marie-de-Monnoir in Marieville. Robert was co-registrar for Rouville County and a director of the Colonization Society for Saint-Jean County. In 1886, he married Marie-Rose Martel. He was first elected to the Quebec assembly in a 1908 by-election held after Alfred Girard was named a judge. Robert resigned his seat in 1922 after being named colonization and immigration agent for Quebec. He later ran unsuccessfully for a seat in the Quebec assembly in 1935. He died in Magog at the age of 84 and was buried in Marieville.
