= Judiciary of England and Wales =

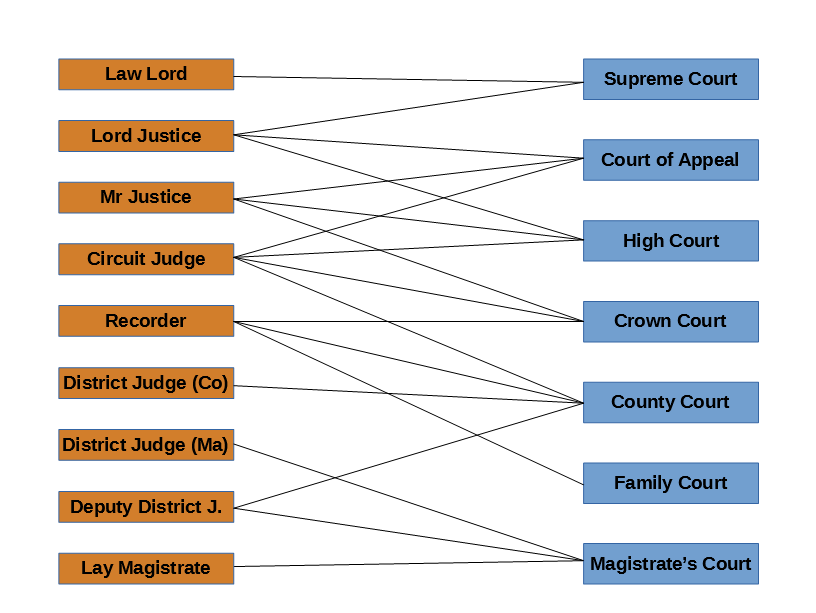
A simplified guide to where each grade of judge presides

There are various levels of judiciary in England and Wales—different types of courts have different styles of judges. They also form a strict hierarchy of importance, in line with the order of the courts in which they sit, so that judges of the Court of Appeal of England and Wales are given more weight than district judges sitting in the County Court and magistrates' courts. On 1 April 2020 there were 3,174 judges in post in England and Wales. Some judges with United Kingdom-wide jurisdiction also sit in England and Wales, particularly Justices of the United Kingdom Supreme Court and members of the tribunals judiciary.

By statute, judges are guaranteed continuing judicial independence.

There have been multiple calls from both Welsh academics and politicians, however, for a distinct Welsh criminal justice system.

The following is a list of the various types of judges who sit in the courts of England and Wales:

== Lord Chief Justice and Lord Chancellor ==
Since 3 April 2006, the lord chief justice has been the overall head of the judiciary. Previously they were second to the lord chancellor, but the judicial functions of that office were transferred to the lord chief justice under the Constitutional Reform Act 2005. The lord chief justice is also the president of the courts and holds, amongst some 400 statutory functions, positions such as the head of the Criminal Division of the Court of Appeal. Historically they were also president of the King's Bench Division of the High Court, but on becoming head of the judiciary that responsibility was transferred to a new office. The lord chief justice is responsible for arranging training for the judiciary, which is achieved through the Judicial College.

Although the lord chancellor is no longer a judge, they still exercise disciplinary authority over the judges, jointly with the lord chief justice. They also have a role in appointing judges, through control of the Judicial Appointments Commission.

In law reports, the lord chief justice is referred to as (for example) "Smith LCJ" or "Lord Smith CJ", and the lord chancellor as "Smith LC".

In court, the lord chief justice wears a black damask gown with gold lace along with a short wig during criminal cases and the black civil gown with gold tabs during civil cases. Ceremonially, the lord chief justice wears the red robe with white trim along with a gold chain and full wig.

The lord chancellor wears white winged shirt with ruffled collar, black waistcoat, and black coat underneath the black damask gown with gold lace, and black knee-length breeches with black silk stockings, and full-bottomed wig during ceremonial occasions.

== Heads of Division ==
There are four Heads of Divisions aside from the Lord Chief Justice: the Master of the Rolls, the President of the King's Bench Division, the President of the Family Division and the Chancellor of the High Court.

The Master of the Rolls is head of the Civil Division of the Court of Appeal. The other Heads are in charge of the three divisions of the High Court.

The Chancellor of the High Court is president of the Chancery Division of the High Court. Until 2006 this role was nominally held by the Lord Chancellor, but was in practice delegated to the vice-chancellor. The vice-chancellor was renamed Chancellor of the High Court when the Lord Chancellor's judicial role was abolished.

The Heads of Division are referred to in law reports as "Smith MR", "Smith P", "Smith P", and "Smith C" respectively. Vice-chancellors from pre-2006 Chancery cases were referred to as "Smith VC".

In court, the Heads of Division wear a black damask gown with gold lace along with a short wig during criminal cases and the black civil gown with gold tabs during civil cases. Ceremonially, the Heads of Division wear red gowns with white trim along with full wigs except for the Master of the Rolls who wears the black damask gown with gold lace and full wig.

== Court of Appeal ==
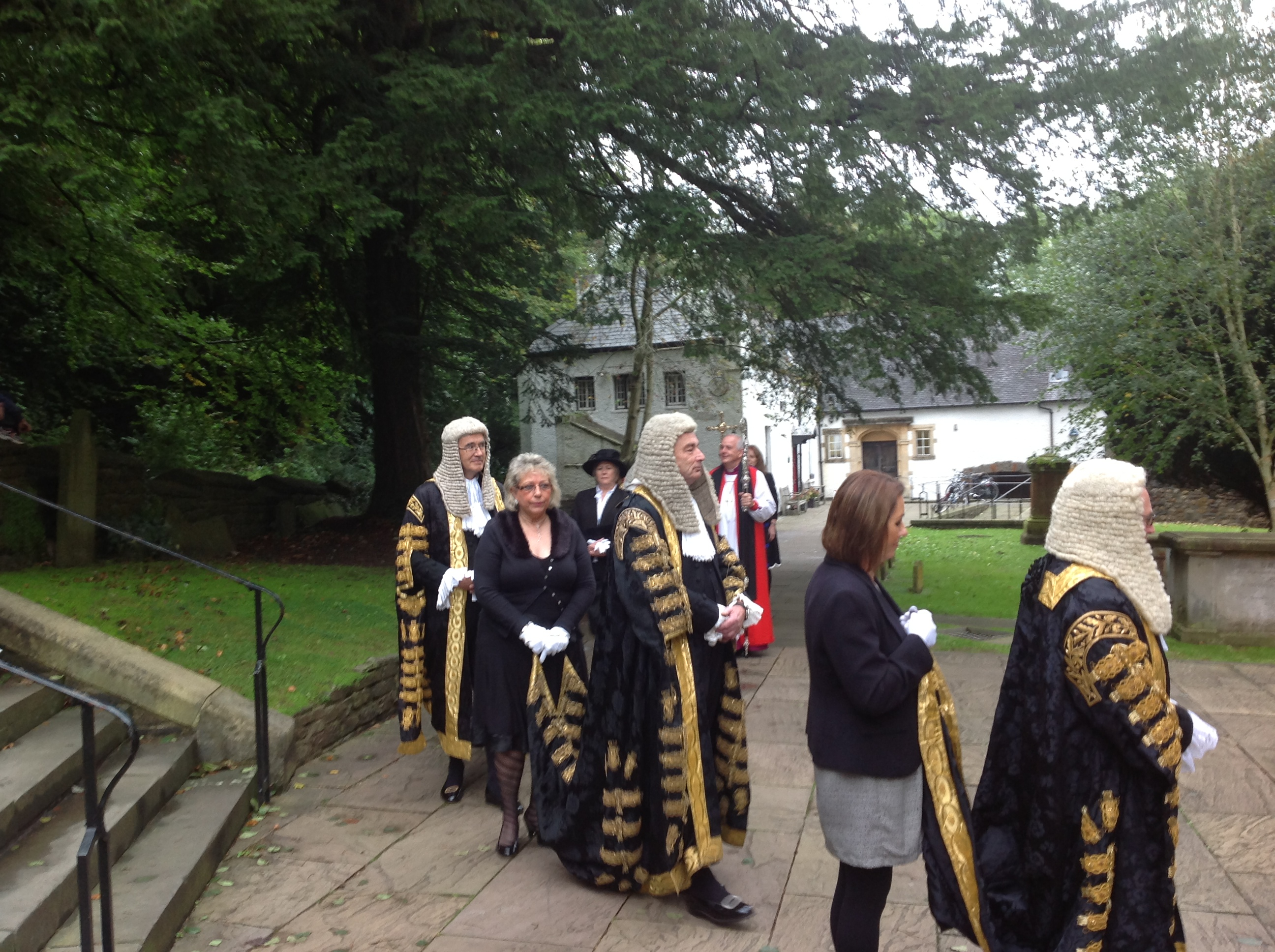
Three Lord Justices in their ceremonial robes in procession at Llandaff Cathedral in 2013

Judges of the Court of Appeal are known as Lord Justices, and they too are Privy Counsellors. Before swearing in they may be referred to as the Honourable Lord Justice Smith, and after swearing in as the Right Honourable Lord Justice Smith. Female Lord Justices are known as Lady Justices. Addressed as "My Lord" or "My Lady". In law reports, referred to as "Smith LJ", and, for more than one judge, "Smith and Jones LJJ".

Formerly, Lord Justices of Appeal could only be drawn from barristers of at least 10 years' standing. In practice, much greater experience was necessary and, in 2004, calls for increased diversity among the judiciary were recognised and the qualification period was changed so that, as of 21 July 2008, a potential Lord Justice of Appeal must satisfy the judicial-appointment eligibility condition on a 7-year basis.

The Lord Justices wear black silk gowns and court coats (or bar jackets) and short wigs during criminal cases and the black civil robe with gold tabs for civil cases. For ceremonial occasions, they wear the full wig and black damask gown with gold lace.

== High Court justices, masters and Insolvency and Companies Court judges ==
High Court justices are not normally Privy Counsellors and are therefore referred to as the Honourable Mr/Mrs Justice Smith. Addressed as "My Lord" or "My Lady". In law reports they are referred to as "Smith J", and, for more than one judge, "Smith and Jones JJ".

High Court justices normally wear a short wig along with red and black gowns for criminal cases, and a civil robe with red tabs without wig for civil cases and, when in open court, family cases. Judges of the Family Division sitting in private wear formal suits. Ceremonially, all High Court justices wear the red gown with white trim along with a full wig.

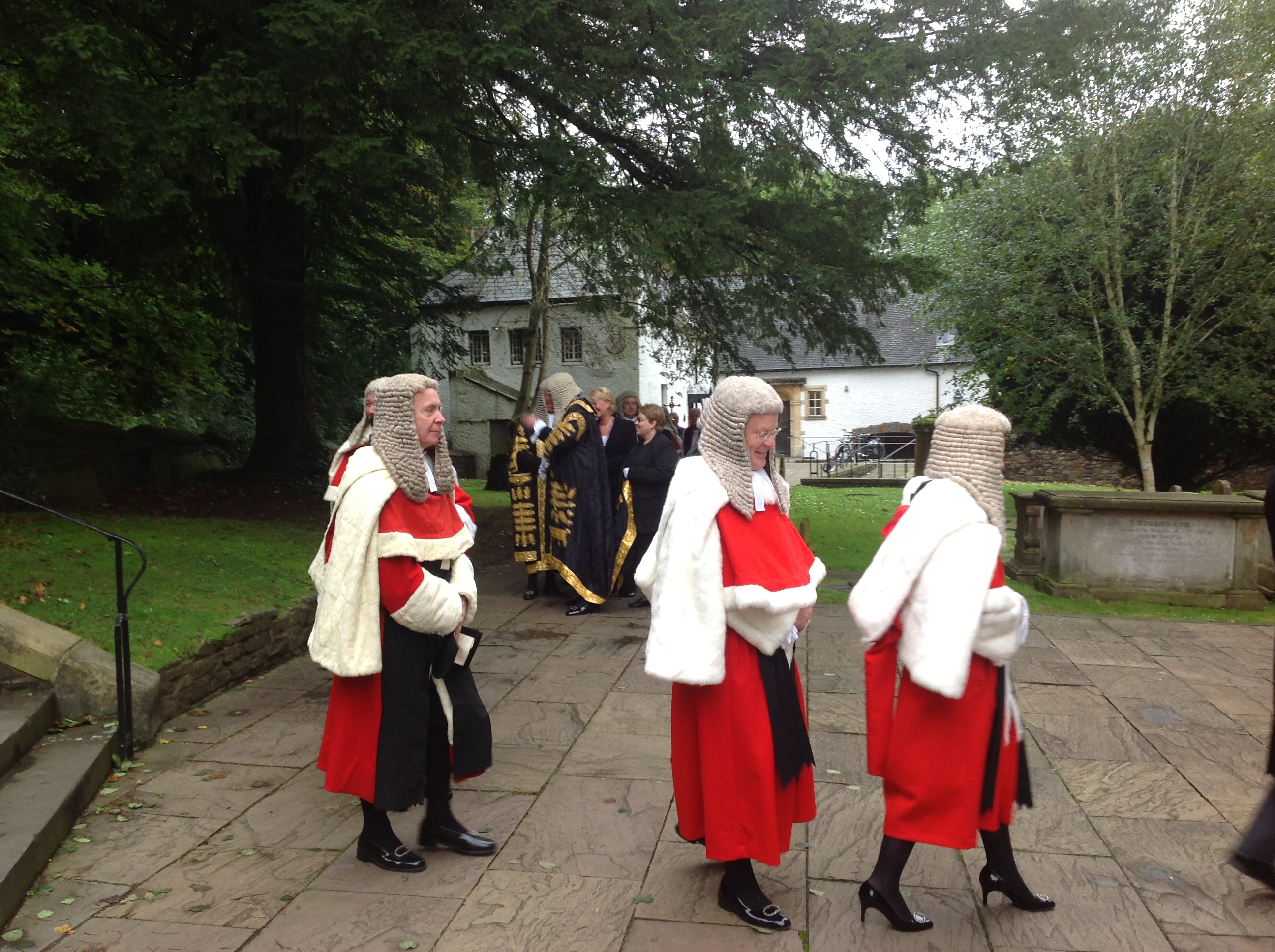
Four High Court justices in their ceremonial robes in procession at Llandaff Cathedral in 2013

A master is a level of judge in the High Court whose decisions are of equal standing to that of a High Court judge at first instance. They are mainly responsible for trials and case management pre-trial in exclusively civil cases in London. They wear dark blue gowns with pink tabs in court and are addressed as 'Master', regardless of gender, or 'Judge'. Ceremonially, they wear a full-bottomed wig, court coat, jabot and black silk gown. Each division has a senior master, and each division has a different title:

- King's Bench Division – Senior Master
- Chancery Division – Chief Chancery Master
- Costs Office – Senior Costs Judge
- Admiralty Court – Admiralty Registrar

The Senior Master of the King's Bench Division also holds the ancient judicial post of King's Remembrancer (Queen's Remembrancer when the monarch is female), and is also the registrar of election petitions and foreign judgments as well as being the designated authority for the Hague Service Convention and Hague Evidence Convention and receiving agency under the EU Service Regulation (EC 1348/2000) and EU Evidence Regulation (EC 1206/2001). The senior master is assisted in this role as Central Authority by the Foreign Process Section of the King's Bench Action Department at the Royal Courts of Justice.

The seven Insolvency and Companies Court judges, one of whom is the Chief Insolvency and Companies Court Judge, hear and dispose of much of the High Court insolvency (both personal and corporate) and pure company law cases and trials in London (such as cases arising under the Insolvency Act 1986, the Company Directors Disqualification Act 1986, the Companies Acts and related legislation). They also hear appeals from district judges of the County Court in the south east region in company law and corporate insolvency matters. For convenience, their title is often abbreviated to "ICC Judge". They wear a dark blue gown with pink tabs in court (but no longer wear wigs) and are addressed as 'Judge'. Ceremonially, they wear a full-bottomed wig, court coat, jabot and black silk gown. As judges exercising the jurisdiction of the High Court their decisions are of equal standing to that of a High Court justice at first instance.

Masters and ICC judges are not referred to with a post-nominal abbreviation in the law reports, and appear as "Master Smith" or "ICC Judge Smith". Formerly, masters and ICC judges could only be drawn from barristers and solicitors of at least seven years' standing. However, in 2004, calls for increased diversity among the judiciary were recognised and the qualification period was changed so that, as of 21 July 2008, a potential master or ICC judge must satisfy the judicial-appointment eligibility condition on a five-year basis.

== Circuit judges ==
Circuit judges are referred to as His/Her Honour Judge {surname} e.g. His/Her Honour Judge Smith. If a circuit judge is appointed who has the same surname as another serving circuit judge, he (she) will be referred to as His (Her) Honour Judge {first name} {surname}. e.g. His Honour Judge John Smith. Circuit judges are addressed as "Your Honour", unless sitting in the Central Criminal Court (the Old Bailey), in which case addressed as "My Lord (Lady)". Senior circuit judges who sit as the honorary recorder of a borough or city are also entitled to be addressed in court as "my lord/lady". In law reports, circuit judges are referred to as "HHJ Smith", or simply, "Judge Smith".

Formerly, circuit judges could only be drawn from barristers and solicitors of at least ten years' standing. However, in 2004, calls for increased diversity among the judiciary were recognised and the qualification period was changed so that, as of 21 July 2008, a potential circuit judge must satisfy the judicial-appointment eligibility condition on a seven-year basis.

For criminal cases, circuit judges wear a violet and purple gown with a red sash and short wig and for civil cases exchange the red sash for a lilac one. Circuit judges sitting in civil proceedings no longer wear wigs, wing collars, or bands. Ceremonially, they wear purple robes with a purple trim and a full wig.

== Recorders ==
A recorder is a part-time circuit judge, usually a practising barrister, solicitor or a member of the courts or tribunal judiciary who is not a full-time circuit judge. Recorders are addressed in court in the same way as circuit judges (as 'Your Honour'). There is no formal abbreviation for the position and recorders are referred to as 'Mr/Mrs Recorder Smith' (as opposed to circuit judges, who can be referred to as 'HHJ Smith' in judgements, law reports or other legal documents).

Formerly, recorders could only be drawn from barristers of at least 10 years' standing. However, in 2004, calls for increased diversity among the judiciary were recognised and the qualification period was changed so that, as of 21 July 2008, a potential recorder must satisfy the judicial-appointment eligibility condition on a seven-year basis.

The senior circuit judge in a metropolitan area will often be given the honorary title of the recorder of the city – e.g. the Recorder of Manchester. Despite still being circuit judges, these recorders are addressed in court as 'My Lord/Lady' as if they were High Court judges.

== District judges ==
District judge is the title given to two different categories of judges. One group of district judges sit in the county courts and have jurisdiction in civil and family cases, having previously been known as registrars until the Courts and Legal Services Act 1990. The other group sit in the magistrates' courts and were formerly known as stipendiary magistrates until the Access to Justice Act 1999. Members of this latter group are more formally known as "district judge (magistrates' courts)" (see the Courts Act 2003). Judges in both groups are addressed as "Judge". In law reports, they are referred to as DJ, such as "DJ Smith".

Formerly, district judges could only be drawn from barristers and solicitors of at least seven years' standing. However, in 2004, calls for increased diversity among the judiciary were recognised and the qualification period was changed so that, since 21 July 2008, a potential district judge must satisfy the judicial-appointment eligibility condition on a five-year basis. From November 2010, other types of lawyer, such as legal executives (fellows of the Chartered Institute of Legal Executives (CILEx)), also became eligible to be district judges.

The senior district judge (magistrates' courts) is also known as the Chief Magistrate.

== Deputy district judges ==
A deputy district judge is a solicitor or barrister who sits part-time as a district judge (who may be taking their first steps on the route to becoming a full-time district judge). Retired district judges sometimes sit as deputies. They are addressed as "Judge". In law reports, they are referred to as, for example, "DDJ Smith".

Formerly, deputy district judges could only be drawn from barristers and solicitors of at least seven years' standing. However, in 2004, calls for increased diversity among the judiciary were recognised and the qualification period was changed so that, since 21 July 2008, a potential deputy district judge must satisfy the judicial-appointment eligibility condition on a five-year basis and so that other types of lawyers, such as chartered legal executives (CILEx Fellows), would be eligible. In August 2010, Ian Ashley-Smith became the first CILEx Fellow to be directly appointed as a deputy district judge (civil).

== Judicial office holders ==
There are a range of professionals who support the judiciary in complex legal cases where there is an interface between the law and another professional area. In these matters, sometimes non-legally qualified judges are appointed to preside over specialist areas. These judges are sometimes referred to as fee-paid (judiciary) officer holders, or non-legal members. An example are those appointed by the Lord Chancellor to sit over Mental Health Review Tribunal. Within this tribunal, there are three panel judges, one will be a legally qualified lawyer, whilst the other two are drawn from the mental health professions, such as social work, nursing or psychology, these are known as Specialist Lay Members. The other is a consultant psychiatrist, known as the Medical Member. All members are addressed as "Sir" or "Madam", but unlike magistrates, these members are paid for their service, normally a day rate for sitting. Also unlike their magistrate counterparts, these members are recruited in the same manner as other judges via the Judicial Appointments Commission.

== Magistrates ==
Magistrates (also known as justices of the peace) are trained volunteers appointed from the local community, who generally sit in threes in order to give judgment in magistrates' courts and youth courts. The chair is addressed as "Sir" or "Madam" or the bench is addressed as "Your Worships".

== Judicial salaries ==
There are eight pay points for judges in the United Kingdom (including England and Wales). The following is a simplified list of annual judicial salaries from 1 April 2024, showing only the most widely-held grades and some of the best known specific appointments. A complete list of all the posts at each pay point can be found on the website of the Ministry of Justice.

- Group 1: Lord Chief Justice, £312,510
- Group 1.1: Master of the Rolls, £279,051
- Group 2: Heads of the High Court divisions, £269,530
- Group 3: Lord Justices of Appeal, £256,304
- Group 4: High Court judges and certain others, £225,092
- Group 5: Numerous specialist appointments, including senior circuit judges and Judge Advocate General, £180,522
- Group 5.1: Chief Insolvency and Companies Court Judge, Chief Chancery Master, Senior King's Bench Master and certain others, £173,856
- Group 5.2: High Court Insolvency and Companies Court Judges, High Court Masters, circuit judges and certain others, £167,167
- Group 6: Vice-Judge Advocate General and certain others, £157,380
- Group 7: District judges of the County Court and magistrates' courts, employment judges, judges of the First Tier Tribunal and several other appointments, £134,105
- Group 8: Salaried (Regional) Medical Members, Social Entitlement Chamber, £106,563

Judges also have a pension scheme, the 1993 and earlier versions of which were once considered to be one of the most generous in the British public sector.

The administrative body of the Supreme Court of the United Kingdom is classified as a non-ministerial department. The Supreme Court is independent of the government of the UK, of Parliament, and of the court services of England and Wales, Scotland and Northern Ireland. It takes appeals from the Appeals Courts of England and Wales and of Northern Ireland, and Scotland's High Court of Justiciary (civil cases only). The President of the Supreme Court of the United Kingdom is paid at Group 1.1, while the Deputy President and the other ten members of the Supreme Court are paid at Group 2.

== See also ==
- Judicial titles in England and Wales
- Judiciary of the United Kingdom
- List of judges of the Supreme Court of the United Kingdom
- Law of the United Kingdom
- High Sheriff
