= Huissier de justice =

Officer of the court in French-speaking regions

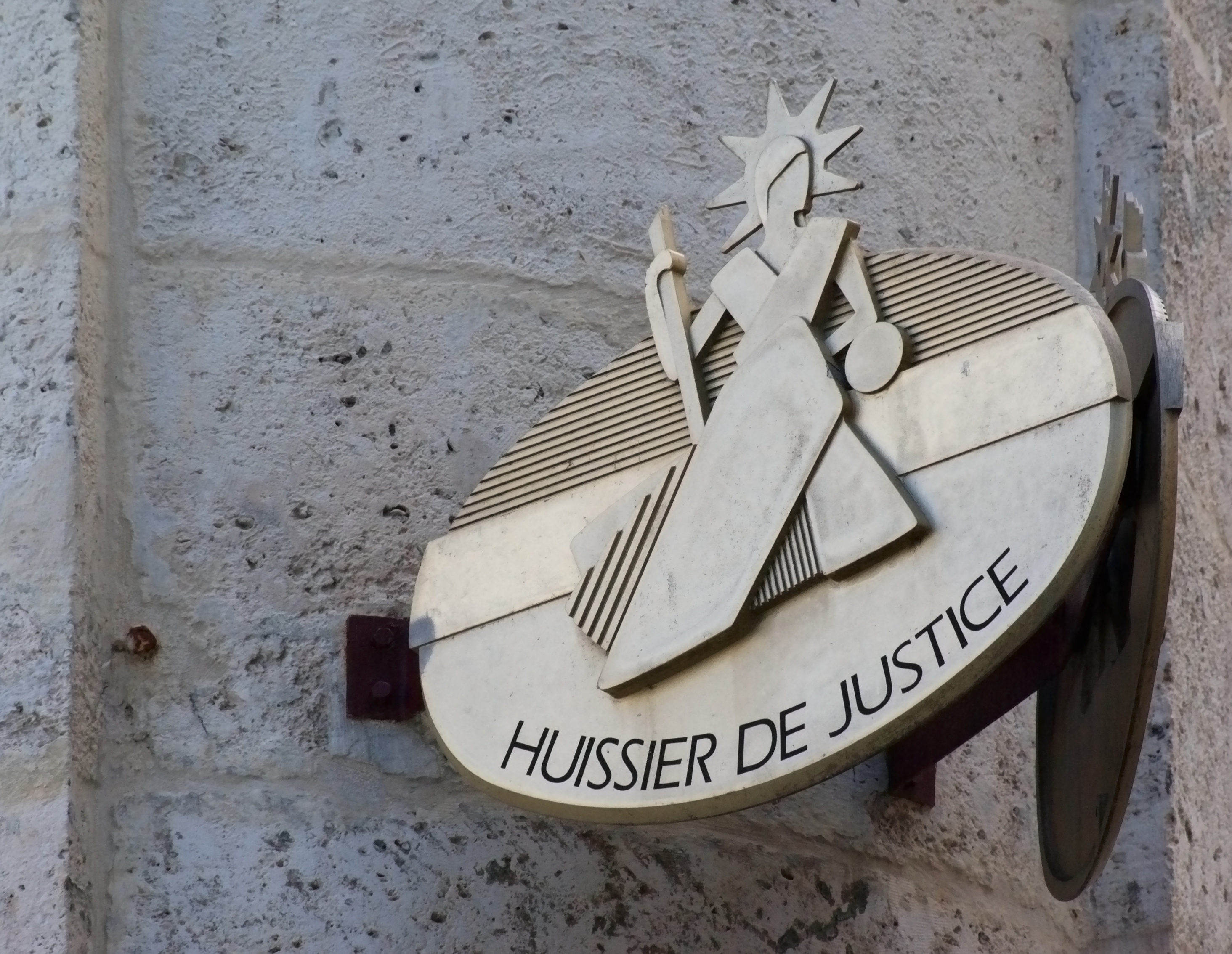
Sign of huissier de justice in Angoulême, France

A huissier de justice (French pronunciation: [ɥisje də ʒystis]; literally French for "justice usher"), sometimes translated to judicial officer, or gerechtsdeurwaarder in Dutch, is an officer of the court in France, Luxembourg, Belgium, Quebec, and Switzerland. The officer is appointed by a magistrate of the court (or in France, by the Minister of Justice) and holds a monopoly on the service and execution of court decisions and enforceable instruments. Huissiers de justice also serve as formal witnesses to events (constat d'huissier) in the manner of a notary public.

There is no exactly similar position in the English or American legal system, but the post is often translated as bailiff or process server because of the roughly similar function.

In their role as a member of the legal profession they are authorized to serve process, and as such are responsible for delivering legal documents and authenticating the parties to whom they are delivered; proceed in the enforcement and recovery of any court and legal claims, including bankruptcy, property claims, seizures, and evictions; issue court summonses (assignments and quotations); and perform other actions. They may also exercise authorizations of a Court of Appeals, and act in insurance and property actions.

Further, they have the sole right to call police hearings to guarantee execution of court orders, and to conduct other activities such as amicable settlements, draft findings of private deeds, and offer limited legal advice. They are authorized to authenticate character findings, which may serve as evidence during litigation. Some elements of their statements cannot be challenged except by way of improbation.

== See also ==
- Gouffé Case – 1889 French murder case
