= Rouville (provincial electoral district) =

Coordinates: 45.422°N 73.058°W

Quebec electoral district

Defunct provincial electoral district
- Legislature: National Assembly of Quebec
- District created: 1867
- District abolished: 1972
- First contested: 1867
- Last contested: 1970

Rouville was a provincial electoral district in the Montérégie region of Quebec, Canada.

It was created for the 1867 election (and an electoral district of that name existed earlier in the Legislative Assembly of the Province of Canada and the Legislative Assembly of Lower Canada). Its final election was in 1970. It disappeared in the 1973 election and its successor electoral districts were Iberville and Chambly.

== Members of the Legislative Assembly / National Assembly ==
- Victor Robert, Liberal (1867–1878)
- Solime Bertrand Conservative Party (1878–1879)
- Flavien-Guillaume Bouthillier, Liberal (1879–1881)
- Étienne Poulin, Parti conservateur du Quebec (1881–1886)
- Edmond Lareau, Liberal (1886–1890)
- Alfred Girard, Liberal (1890–1897)
- Alexandre-Napoléon Dufresne, Conservative Party (1897–1900)
- Alfred Girard, Liberal (1900–1908)
- Joseph Edmond Robert, Liberal (1908–1923)
- Cyrille-Améric Bernard, Liberal (1923–1931)
- Laurent Barré, Conservative Party – Union Nationale(1931–1939)
- Henri-Pascal Panet, Liberal (1939–1944)
- Laurent Barré, Union Nationale (1944–1960)
- François Boulais, Liberal (1960–1966)
- Paul-Yvon Hamel, Union Nationale (1966–1970)
- Marcel Ostiguy, Liberal (1970–1973)
