= Solime Bertrand =

Canadian politician

Member of the Legislative Assembly of Quebec for Rouville
- In office 1878–1879
- Preceded by: Victor Robert
- Succeeded by: Flavien-Guillaume Bouthillier

Personal details
- Born: December 12, 1827 Saint-Mathias, Lower Canada
- Died: February 10, 1891 (aged 63) Saint-Mathias, Quebec
- Party: Conservative

Solime Bertrand (December 12, 1827 – February 10, 1891) was a notary and political figure in Quebec, Canada. He represented Rouville in the Legislative Assembly of Quebec from 1878 to 1879 as a Conservative.

Bertrand was born in Saint-Mathias, Lower Canada to Paul Bertrand (also a Notary) and Agathe Vigeant, and was educated at the Collège de Chambly. He qualified as a Notary in 1849. In 1854, he married Marie-Louise-Hermine Demers. He served as president of the Agricultural Society for Rouville Regional County Municipality, Quebec, secretary for the municipality of Saint-Mathias and as a member and secretary-treasurer for the school board. His election in 1878 was overturned in 1879 for reasons undetermined. Bertrand died in Saint-Mathias at the age of 63.
