= Judicial titles in England and Wales =

List of titles given to members of the Judiciary of England and Wales

The Judiciary of England and Wales contains many levels, based on the court in which the judge sits. Titles are given to judges relating to their position and, in the case of knighthoods and peerages, this includes the positions they had previously held. Retired judges that sit in any court use their full name with their titles added (such as Sir or Dame, or post-nominal KC). Members or former members of the higher judiciary who are King's Counsel do not use the post-nominal letters KC.

Due to the various honours bestowed on members of the judiciary and traditions associated with the varying levels, their personal titles and forms of address often change as they progress in a judicial career.

== Extant titles ==
=== Supreme Court and the Judicial Committee of the Privy Council ===
Office		Judicial title	Abbreviated title (in law reports, etc.)	Form of address		Private title	Private form of address
Office		Judicial title	Abbreviated title (in law reports, etc.)	In court	Out of court	Private title	Private form of address
President of the Supreme Court		The Right Hon. the President of the Supreme Court	Lord/Lady Jones P	My Lord/Lady	Lord/Lady Jones	Lord/Lady Jones	Lord/Lady Jones
Deputy President of the Supreme Court		The Right Hon. the Deputy President of the Supreme Court	Lord/Lady Jones DP	My Lord/Lady	Lord/Lady Jones	Lord/Lady Jones	Lord/Lady Jones
Justice of the Supreme Court	Male	The Right Hon. Lord Jones	Lord Jones SCJ	My Lord	Lord Jones	Lord Jones	Lord Jones
Justice of the Supreme Court	Female	The Right Hon. Lady Smith	Lady Smith SCJ	My Lady	Lady Smith	Lady Smith	Lady Smith

If there are two Justices of the Supreme Court with the same surname, then the junior Justice will take a territorial designation (i.e. "of [place]") in their title. When two or more Justices are referred at the same time in a law report, their post-nominal letters become SCJJ.

=== Court of Appeal ===
Office		Judicial title	Abbreviated title (in law reports, etc.)	Form of address		Private title	Private form of address
Office		Judicial title	Abbreviated title (in law reports, etc.)	In court	Out of court	Private title	Private form of address
Lord Chief Justice of England and Wales (if a peer)		The Right Hon. the Lord Chief Justice of England and Wales	Jones LCJ	My Lord	Lord Chief Justice	Lord Jones (when title does not include a territorial designation)/The Lord Jones of Luton (when title includes a territorial designation)	Lord Jones
Master of the Rolls and Records of the Chancery of England (Master of the Rolls) (if a peer)		The Right Hon. the Master of the Rolls	Lord Jones MR	My Lord	Master of the Rolls	Lord Jones (when title does not include a territorial designation)/The Lord Jones of Luton (when title includes a territorial designation)	Lord Jones
Master of the Rolls		The Right Hon. the Master of the Rolls	Sir John Smith MR	My Lord	Master of the Rolls	Sir John Smith	Sir John
Lord Justice of Appeal	Male	The Right Hon. Lord Justice Smith	Smith LJ	My Lord	Judge	Sir John Smith	Sir John
Lord Justice of Appeal	Female	The Right Hon. Lady Justice Smith	Smith LJ	My Lady	Judge	Dame Jane Smith	Dame Jane

If there are two Lord Justices of the Appeal with the same surname, then the junior Lord Justice will take their first name as part of their judicial title. When two or more Lord Justices are referred at the same time in a law report, their post-nominal letters become LJJ.

=== High Court ===
Office		Judicial title	Abbreviated title (in law reports, etc.)	Form of address		Private title	Private form of address
Office		Judicial title	Abbreviated title (in law reports, etc.)	In court	Out of court	Private title	Private form of address
President of the King's Bench Division	Male	The Right Hon. the President of the King's Bench Division	Sir John Smith P	My Lord	President	Sir John Smith	Sir John
President of the King's Bench Division	Female	The Right Hon. the President of the King's Bench Division	Dame Jane Smith P	My Lady	President	Dame Jane Smith	Dame Jane
President of the Family Division	Male	The Right Hon. the President of the Family Division	Sir John Smith P	My Lord	President	Sir John Smith	Sir John
President of the Family Division	Female	The Right Hon. the President of the Family Division	Dame Jane Smith P	My Lady	President	Dame Jane Smith	Dame Jane
Chancellor of the High Court	Male	The Right Hon. the Chancellor of the High Court	Sir John Smith C	My Lord	Chancellor	Sir John Smith	Sir John
Chancellor of the High Court	Female	The Right Hon. the Chancellor of the High Court	Dame Jane Smith C	My Lady	Chancellor	Dame Jane Smith	Dame Jane
Justice of His Majesty's High Court of Justice (High Court judge)	Male	The Hon. Mr Justice Smith	Smith J	My Lord	Judge	Sir John Smith	Sir John
Justice of His Majesty's High Court of Justice (High Court judge)	Female	The Hon. Mrs Justice Smith	Smith J	My Lady	Judge	Dame Jane Smith	Dame Jane
Insolvency and Companies Court Judge		Insolvency and Companies Court Judge Smith	ICC Judge Smith	Judge (unless sitting as a deputy High Court Judge, in which case My Lord or My Lady as appropriate)	Judge		
Senior Master of the King's Bench Division		Master Smith	Master Smith	Judge	Master		
Chief Master of the Chancery Division		Chief Master Smith	Master Smith	Judge	Master		
Master		Master Smith	Master Smith	Judge	Master		
Registrar		Registrar Smith	Registrar Smith	Registrar	Registrar		
Circuit Judge sitting as a High Court judge		His (Her) Honour Judge Smith (KC)	HHJ Smith (KC)	My Lord (Lady)	Judge	Judge Smith	Judge
Barrister or solicitor sitting as a deputy High Court judge		John Smith (KC)	John Smith (KC)	My Lord (Lady)			
Barrister or solicitor sitting as a Deputy Master of the High Court		Deputy Master Smith (KC)	Deputy Master Smith (KC)	Judge	Master		

If there are two Justices of the High Court with the same surname, then the junior Justice will take their first name as part of their judicial title. When two or more Justices are referred at the same time in a law report, their post-nominal letters become JJ.

=== Junior courts ===
Office	Judicial title	Abbreviated title (in law reports, etc.)	Form of address		Private title	Private form of address
Office	Judicial title	Abbreviated title (in law reports, etc.)	In court	Out of court	Private title	Private form of address
Circuit Judge sitting at the Central Criminal Court	His (Her) Honour Judge Smith (KC)	HHJ Smith (KC)	My Lord (Lady)	Judge	Judge Smith	Judge
Honorary Recorder	His (Her) Honour Judge Smith (KC)	HHJ Smith (KC)	My Lord (Lady)	Judge	Judge Smith	Judge
Circuit Judge	His (Her) Honour Judge Smith (KC)	HHJ Smith (KC)	Your Honour	Judge	Judge Smith	Judge
Deputy Circuit Judge	His Honour John Smith (KC)	HH John Smith (KC)	Your Honour			
Recorder sitting at the Central Criminal Court	Mr (Mrs) Recorder Smith (KC)	Mr (Mrs) Recorder Smith (KC)	My Lord (Lady)			
Recorder	Mr (Mrs) Recorder Smith (KC)	Mr (Mrs) Recorder Smith (KC)	Your Honour			
Adjudicator (Tribunal Judge)	Mr (Mrs) Adjudicator Smith (KC)	Mr (Mrs) Adjudicator Smith (KC)	Sir/Madam			
District Judge	District Judge Smith (KC)	DJ Smith (KC)	Judge	Judge		
District Judge (magistrates' courts)	District Judge (Magistrates' Courts) Smith	DJ(MC) Smith	Judge	Judge		
Deputy District Judge	Deputy District Judge Smith	DDJ Smith	Judge			
Magistrate	John Smith JP	John Smith JP	Your Worships; Sir/Madam (if addressed individually)			

== Extinct titles ==
Office		Judicial title	Abbreviated title (in law reports, etc.)	Form of address		Private title	Private form of address
Office		Judicial title	Abbreviated title (in law reports, etc.)	In court	Out of court	Private title	Private form of address
Lord Chancellor		The Right Hon. the Lord High Chancellor of Great Britain	Lord Jones LC	My Lord	Lord Chancellor	Lord Smith (when title does not include a territorial designation)/The Lord Jones of Luton (when title includes a territorial designation)	Lord Jones
Lord of Appeal in Ordinary	Male	The Right Hon. Lord Smith/The Lord Jones of Luton	Lord Smith/Jones	My Lord	Lord Smith/Jones	Lord Smith (when title does not include a territorial designation)/The Lord Jones of Luton (when title includes a territorial designation)	Lord Smith/Jones
Lord of Appeal in Ordinary	Female	The Right Hon. Baroness Williams/The Baroness Hale of Richmond	Lady Hale	My Lady	Baroness/Lady Williams/Hale	Baroness/Lady Williams (when title does not include a territorial designation) The Baroness/Lady Hale of Richmond (when title includes a territorial designation)	Baroness/Lady Williams/Hale
Chief Justice of the Common Pleas		The Right Hon. the Chief Justice of the Common Pleas	Sir John Smith CJ	My Lord	Chief Justice	Sir John Smith	Sir John
Chief Baron of the Exchequer		The Right Hon. the Lord Chief Baron	Sir John Smith LCB	My Lord	Lord Chief Baron Smith	Sir John Smith	Sir John
Vice-Chancellor of the High Court		The Right Hon. the Vice-Chancellor	Sir John Smith V-C	My Lord	Vice-Chancellor	Sir John Smith	Sir John
Baron of the Exchequer		The Hon. Mr Baron Smith	Smith B	My Lord		Sir John Smith	Sir John
