= Registered agent =

Someone designated to receive service of process in a legal action

In United States business law, a registered agent (also known as a resident agent, statutory agent, or agent for service of process) is a business or individual designated to receive service of process (SOP) when a business entity is a party to a legal action, such as a lawsuit or summons. The registered agent's address may also be where the state sends paperwork for the periodic renewal of the business entity's charter (if required). The registered agent for a business entity may be an officer or employee of the company, or a third party, such as the organization's lawyer or a dedicated service company. Failure to properly maintain a registered agent can negatively affect a company.

== Nomenclature ==
A registered agent is a designated person or entity authorized to receive legal and official documents on behalf of a company. Depending on the jurisdiction, they may be referred to as a resident agent, statutory agent, commercial clerk, or noncommercial clerk, as these terms are largely interchangeable. A process agent fulfills a similar function, but this specific term is used by the Federal Motor Carrier Safety Administration (FMCSA) for motor carriers, freight forwarders, and brokers. A commercial registered agent is a person or entity that serves as a registered agent for hire and must be registered as such with the secretary of state.

== Services provided ==
A registered agent can serve different types of businesses, but they are required by law only for limited liability companies (LLCs), limited partnerships (LPs), limited liability partnerships (LLPs), and corporations. These types of business entities can offer liability protections and tax advantages over sole proprietorships and general partnerships.

== Designation ==
A registered agent is designated by a business entity by completing a form and filing it with the appropriate government agency, most commonly the Secretary of State's office.

=== Initial designation ===
In almost all cases, the registered agent for a business entity is assigned in the formation documents filed in a jurisdiction when the entity is originally created. For example, a person forming a corporation in the State of Nevada or Delaware, would designate the registered agent, along with the agent's address, on the articles of incorporation filed with the Nevada Secretary of State or Delaware Secretary of State, respectively. If the agent cannot sign the articles to be filed, some states, such as Nevada, provide that the registered agent may be designated using a separate Registered Agent Acceptance form with the appropriate acceptance and signature. A representative of the business or the individual accepting responsibility as the registered agent must sign to accept the responsibility of acting as an agent. In most states, it is a crime to knowingly file a false document with the office of the Secretary of State, although the penalties vary widely.

=== Change of agent ===
A business entity might at some point want to change its previously designated registered agent to another party. This is accomplished by obtaining a form from the secretary of state where the business entity is registered, completing said form, and filing it with that state office along with any requisite fees which may vary from state to state. In some cases the required form may simply be a dedicated change of registered agent form, and in other cases, such as in Delaware, an actual amendment to the articles of the business entity must be filed.

== Locating registered agents ==
A registered agent can be an attorney or a commercial company, or a business owner can choose to act as their own agent. Information about persons or entities that are available to act as registered agents in a given state may be maintained by the secretary of state's office. Most states also offer free online database searches to identify a business entity's registered agent.

Some state business entity laws name the secretary of state's office or the business entity filing office as the registered agent of last resort if the named registered agent cannot be found. By law, service may be made on that office if the entity's registered agent is unavailable. However, the plaintiff must demonstrate that it made a good-faith effort to serve the registered agent before it may serve the secretary of state. State laws vary regarding how to complete service on the secretary of state and the amount of fees charged.

== Regulation ==
Most jurisdictions in the United States require that any business entity that is formed or doing business within their borders designate and maintain a "registered agent". This person may be known as the "resident agent" or "statutory agent", depending on the laws of the individual jurisdiction in which the business entity is registered. The purpose of a registered agent is to provide a legal address (not a P.O. Box) within that jurisdiction where there are persons available during normal business hours to facilitate legal service of process being served in the event of a legal action or lawsuit. Generally, the registered agent is also the person to whom the state government sends all official documents required each year for tax and legal purposes, such as franchise tax notices and annual report forms. It is the registered agent's duty to forward these suit documents and notices to the entity itself. A registered agent may choose to resign if the designating entity is not in good standing.

The failure to maintain a registered agent may cause a jurisdiction to revoke a business's corporate or LLC legal status, imposition of penalty fees on the entity, or both.

=== Who may serve as a registered agent ===
Different states have different requirements for registered agents. Typically, the agent must be an individual residing in that state. In states that allow entities to serve as registered agents, it must be an entity authorized to do business there with a physical office in the state. Some states allow a business to act as its own registered agent if an officer is a resident, but others may require designating a third party. Most states permit one entity to serve as a registered agent for others and commercial registered agent companies exist to fill this role, serving thousands of businesses for a fee.

=== Model Registered Agents Act ===
The Model Registered Agents Act (MoRAA) is an effort spearheaded by the American Bar Association (ABA) Business Law Section and the International Association of Commercial Administrators (IACA) – Business Organization Section (BOS) to standardize business entity laws as they relate to annual reports, registered agents, and other laws and forms used to file business entities. The act also creates two distinct classes of registered agent: "commercial" and "non-commercial." The National Conference of Commissioners on Uniform State Laws (NCCUSL) organized a drafting committee with representatives from the ABA and IACA to write the act. NCCUSL adopted MoRAA at its 2006 annual meeting. It was amended in 2011. Eleven US jurisdictions (Arkansas, District of Columbia, Idaho, Maine, Mississippi, Montana, Nevada, North Dakota, South Dakota, Utah, and Wyoming) have since adopted the model act, and Delaware did not adopt the act, but did adopt the "commercial registered agent" provision. The problem this effort seeks to alleviate is that disparate laws, filing requirements, and forms in all of the US jurisdictions where business entities are filed creates a quagmire for any company seeking to register to do business in those jurisdictions. By adopting a common set of laws, the Model Registered Agents Act seeks to create a uniform and simple process of filing and maintaining a business entity in any jurisdiction adopting it.

== See also ==
- List of secretaries of state, who in the United States, provide information about available registered agents in each state
