= Étienne Poulin =

Canadian politician

Member of the Legislative Assembly of Quebec for Rouville
- In office 1881–1886
- Preceded by: Flavien-Guillaume Bouthillier
- Succeeded by: Edmond Lareau

Personal details
- Born: June 27, 1835 Sainte-Marie-de-Monnoir, Lower Canada
- Died: October 25, 1901 (aged 66) Sainte-Marie-de-Monnoir, Quebec
- Party: Conservative
- Relations: Joseph-Napoléon Poulin, brother

Étienne Poulin (June 27, 1835 – October 25, 1901) was a farmer and political figure in Quebec. He represented Rouville in the Legislative Assembly of Quebec from 1881 to 1886 as a Conservative.

He was born in Sainte-Marie-de-Monnoir, Lower Canada, the son of Étienne Poulin and Charlotte Hébert, and was educated at the Collège de Saint-Hyacinthe. In 1854, he married Marcelline Vigeant. Poulin was president of the school board for Marieville from 1868 to 1871 and from 1881 to 1882. He was mayor of Sainte-Marie-de-Monnoir in 1882. He was defeated when he ran for reelection in 1886 and 1890 and again in Iberville in 1897. He died in Sainte-Marie-de-Monnoir at the age of 66.

His older brother Joseph-Napoléon served in the legislative assembly and legislative council for the Province of Canada.
