= Process agent =

A process agent or process server is a representative upon whom court papers may be served. In the US, the role is generally a requirement of US State law and is known as a registered agent, a resident agent or statutory agent. Process agents are also utilized in the US by truck drivers, brokers or freight forwarders for similar purposes. Process agents that provide nationwide coverage for motor carriers are commonly referred to as blanket companies.

In the UK, a process agent is a contractual relationship, permitted by the Civil Procedure Rules.

== England and Wales ==
Under English Civil Procedure Rules, it is necessary to serve papers to start proceedings correctly. If a party does not have an address within the United Kingdom, the procedure for serving these papers can be lengthy and complicated, with proof of service particularly difficult in some circumstances.

It is therefore customary to appoint a process agent and contractually agree that service at the address of the agent will constitute proper service for the purposes of Rule 6.1.1 of the Civil Procedure Rules. In order to meet the requirements of Rule 6.1.1, an appropriate contractual clause needs to be inserted into the agreement specifying the details of the appointment.

It is also possible to appoint a Process Agent for the purposes of arbitration proceedings in a similar manner.

The role of a process agent is a vitally important service for many businesses dealing with suppliers, banks or tenders in the UK. Process agents accept service of notices, proceedings or documents on behalf of their overseas clients in situations where it is not possible for them to be served abroad. A process agent can act in a broad capacity for a company including but not limited to; acting as a process agent for court actions, receiving documents in connection with arbitration proceedings and receiving notices under contracts where an independent party is needed.

A typical example of a process agency arrangement is where an overseas entity raises a loan from a city institution. Often the lending bank will require the appointment of a UK-based process agent to receive formal notices should the borrower default on the loan.
