= Victor Robert =

Canadian politician

Member of the Legislative Assembly of Quebec for Rouville
- In office 1867–1878
- Succeeded by: Solime Bertrand

Personal details
- Born: 1822 Chambly, Lower Canada
- Died: January 25, 1885 (aged 62–63) Marieville, Quebec
- Party: Liberal
- Children: Joseph-Edmond Robert

Victor Robert (1822 – January 25, 1885) was a farmer, carpenter and political figure in Quebec. He represented Rouville in the Legislative Assembly of Quebec from 1867 to 1878 as a Liberal. His name also appears as Victor Robert, dit Lafontaine.

He was born in Chambly, Lower Canada, the son of Jean-Baptiste Robert, dit Lafontaine and Marie-Anne Tifault. He established himself at Marieville. Robert served as justice of the peace, member of the municipal council and mayor of Marieville. In 1846, he married Euphrasie Désautels. Robert was defeated when he ran for reelection to the Quebec assembly in 1878 and 1881. He died at Marieville in 1885.

His son Joseph-Edmond also represented Rouville in the Quebec assembly.
