= Service of process =

Official process of notifying someone of legal proceedings

In the U.S. legal system, service of process is the procedure by which a party to a lawsuit gives an appropriate notice of initial legal action to another party (such as a defendant), court, or administrative body in an effort to exercise jurisdiction over that person so as to force that person to respond to the proceeding in a court, body, or other tribunal. Notice is furnished by delivering a set of court documents (called "process") to the person to be served.

== Service ==
Each jurisdiction has rules regarding the appropriate service of process. Typically, a copy of the summons and initial pleadings must be served upon the defendant personally, or in some cases upon another person of suitable age and discretion at the person's residence or place of business or employment. In some cases, service of process may be effected through the mail as in some small claims court procedures. In exceptional cases, other forms of service may be authorized by procedural rules or court order, including service by publication when an individual cannot be located in a particular jurisdiction.

Proper service of process initially establishes personal jurisdiction of the court over the person served. If the defendant ignores further pleadings or fails to participate in the proceedings, then the court or administrative body may find the defendant in default and award relief to the claimant, petitioner or plaintiff. The defendant may contest the default in the defendant's home state. Service of process must be distinguished from service of subsequent documents (such as pleadings and motion papers) between the parties to the litigation.

Service of process in cases filed in the United States district courts is governed by Rule 4 of the Federal Rules of Civil Procedure. In England and Wales, the rules governing service of documents are contained within Part 6 of the Civil Procedure Rules 1998 (as well as the Practice Directions). In Canada the rules vary from province to province and can be governed differently depending on what the type of case (i.e. family, small claims, criminal, etc.).

Service on a defendant who resides in a country outside the jurisdiction of a court must comply with special procedures prescribed under the Hague Service Convention if the recipient's country is a signatory. Service on defendants in many South American countries and some other countries is effected through the letter rogatory process. Where a defendant's whereabouts are unknown, a court may permit service by publication, usually in a newspaper.

== Manner of service ==
=== Substituted service ===
When an individual party to be served is unavailable for personal service, many jurisdictions allow for substituted service. Substituted service allows the process server to leave service documents with another responsible individual, called a person of suitable age and discretion, such as a cohabiting adult or a teenager. Under the U.S. Federal Rules, substituted service may only be made at the abode or dwelling of the defendant. California, New York, Illinois, and many other United States jurisdictions require that in addition to substituted service, the documents be mailed to the recipient. Substituted service often requires a serving party show that ordinary service is impracticable, that due diligence has been made to attempt to make personal service by delivery, and that substituted service will reach the party and effect notice.

Another method of substituted service is "service by publication" also called "constructive service" in some jurisdictions. Service by publication is used to give "constructive notice" to a defendant who is intentionally absent, in hiding, or unknown (such as a possible descendant of a former landowner), and only when allowed by a judge's order based on a sworn declaration of the inability to find the defendant after "due diligence". Service by publication is commonly used in a divorce action to serve a spouse who has disappeared without leaving a forwarding address. Service by publication usually involves placing the petition for divorce and the summons to a missing spouse in a local newspaper.

In divorce cases, most states that permit service by publication will require due diligence to locate the missing spouse, which can include verifying with the post office that there is no forwarding address; contacting in writing all friends, relatives, and former employers of a spouse who may know the spouse's current address; checking all jails and prisons for any record of a spouse; and checking military records for a spouse.

In addition, in some jurisdictions, substituted service may be effected through motion and public notice, followed by sending the documents by certified mail.

Courts in at least two Canadian provincial jurisdictions have allowed for substituted service via Facebook. In 2018, the Ontario Superior Court of Justice allowed service via Instagram and LinkedIn's built-in messaging systems.

=== Service by mail ===
Service by mail is permitted by most U.S. jurisdictions for service on defendants located in other U.S. states or foreign countries. Service by mail is not available if the country of destination has filed objections to service by mail pursuant to the multinational Hague Service Convention. In California, "Any person providing the [California Department of Motor Vehicles] with a mailing address shall consent to receive service of process".

=== Voluntary acceptance of service (United States) ===
As a substitute for personal service by a process server, some jurisdictions may allow voluntary acceptance of service, also called waiver of service. It means that the served party agrees to voluntarily acknowledge receipt of the complaint or petition without the need to engage a process server.

Acceptance or waiver of service is encouraged by some court systems, especially U.S. federal courts. Under the Federal Rules of Civil Procedure 4(d)(2), when a defendant refuses to waive service "without good cause", the defendant can be held liable for the cost of personal service.

=== Personal service by court services process server ===
Personal service is service of process directly to a party named on the summons, complaint, or petition. In most lawsuits in the United States, personal service is required to prove service. Most states allow substituted service in almost all lawsuits unless a corporation, LLC, LLP, or other business entity is being served; in those cases, personal service must be achieved by serving the documents to the registered agent of a business entity. Some states, e.g. Florida, do not require that the documents actually be handed to the individual. In California and most other states, the documents must be visible to the person being served, i.e., not in a sealed envelope. If the individual refuses to accept service, flees, closes the door, etc., and the individual has been positively identified as the person to be served, the documents may be "drop served" (placed as close to the individual as possible); this is considered a valid service. In the US, personal service of process has been the hallmark for initiating litigation for nearly 100 years, primarily because it guarantees actual notice to the defendant of a legal action.

=== Digital Delivery of Legal Documents ===
Digital delivery of legal documents refers to the use of secure electronic channels such as e-mail, dedicated secure web portals, and cryptographically-anchored systems to effect compliant service and receipt of court papers. In many jurisdictions, courts now permit parties to consent to electronic delivery in lieu of traditional personal service or mail, provided that the method ensures authentication of the recipient and reliable proof of transmission.

=== Common law systems in the United States ===
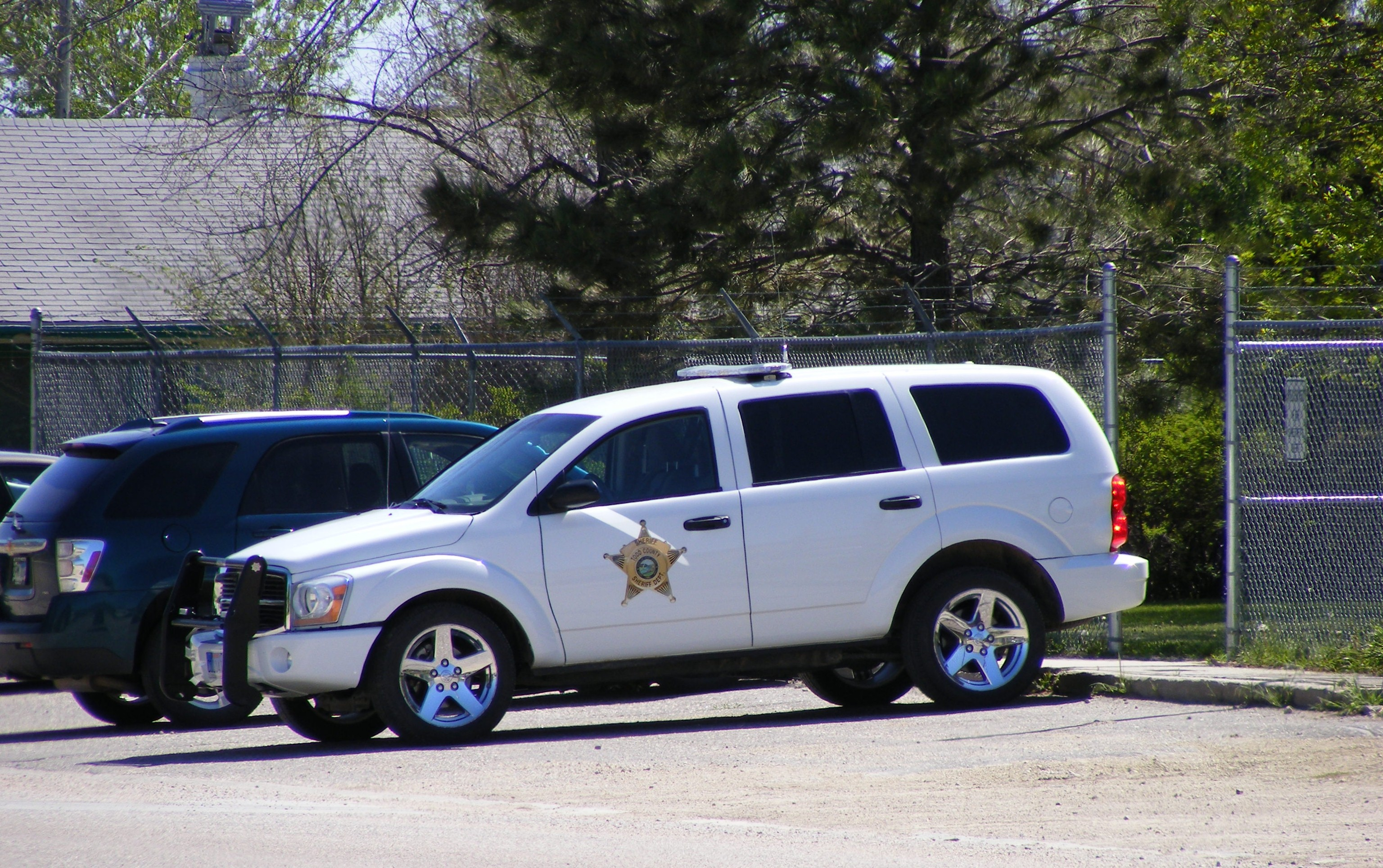
Personal service of civil documents is often done by sheriff's deputies.

According to the Federal Rules of Civil Procedure, a person that serves the process must be 18 years of age or older and not a party to the litigation.

Most jurisdictions require or permit process to be served by a court official, such as a sheriff, marshal, constable, or bailiff. There may be licensing requirements for private process servers, as is the case in New York City, Alaska, Arizona, California, Georgia, Illinois, Montana, Nevada, and Oklahoma. Arizona process servers are required to apply for certification with the clerk of the Superior Court in the county in which they reside. Non-resident applicants may apply in any county. Texas process servers are currently certified by order of the Texas Supreme Court and are regulated through the Process Server Review Board, consisting of members of the industry authorized by the supreme court.

Other jurisdictions require a court order allowing a private person to serve process. Many private investigators perform process serving duties. Texas and Florida also have a required training course which must be completed prior to certification.

An example of such a license would be in Rhode Island, where an applicant must complete 90 days of training with a constable that has 'full powers'. Once the 90 days of training is complete, a test is given at the local courthouse from the laws included in the constable manual. Once an applicant passed the written exam, one will be scheduled for an oral interview with the disciplinary board. If they find the applicant to be competent, they will pass a recommendation to the chief judge who will then swear in one with 'limited power'. These constables can only serve within the county they are appointed. After one year, a limited power constable can apply for his/her full powers to arrest, evict, and be able to serve statewide.

In New York State, personal process is required in divorce and similar matrimonial law actions, absent court permission. Specific practice is that:

The defendant must be personally served with the divorce papers, unless the court grants some other means of service. Note that there are special requirements for service of process in a divorce action.

See CPLR 308 and DRL 232.

=== Federal (United States) ===
The service of federal civil process in the United States is governed by Federal Rules of Civil Procedure, Rule 4. Any person who is at least 18 years of age and is not a party to the case may serve a federal civil summons and complaint. This general rule also applies to the service of federal subpoenas under Federal Rules of Civil Procedure, Rule 45.

=== Civil law systems ===
In civil law jurisdictions, which include all of Continental Europe and most Asian, African, and South American countries, service of process is generally performed by the court. This may be done in person by a bailiff, or by mail, depending on the jurisdiction.

=== International service ===
International service of foreign judicial and extrajudicial documents is governed in general by the 1965 Hague Service Convention. Prior to the enactment of the Hague Service Convention, service of process in civil cases was generally effected by a letter rogatory, a formal request from the court in the country where proceedings were initiated or underway to a court in another country where the defendant resided. This procedure generally required the use of consular and diplomatic channels as the request had to be made to the foreign minister (the Secretary of State in the United States) of the defendant's country by the foreign minister of the originating court.

Since 1965, member states designate a central authority for service of process and requests go directly there. In addition, many states allow some type of service directly by mail or personal service by a person otherwise authorized to service process without involvement of local courts.

== Agent for acceptance of service ==
In some instances, delivery to an agent for acceptance of service or "registered agent" can substitute for personal service on the principal party to be served. The registered agent is a person or company authorized in advance to accept service on behalf of the served party. For example, most corporations are required by local law to maintain a local agent of record for acceptance of service in each jurisdiction where they actively conduct business with the public. The identity of the agent for service can usually be ascertained by searching company filings with appropriate state corporate records or business registration agencies (often the business entity division of a state's secretary of state. Generally, these business registration records are searchable by the public on the secretary of state's website.

In the UK an agent for acceptance of service is generally known as a process agent and is a contractual relationship rather than a statutory one.

== Return of service ==
Once service of process has been effected, the responsible officer or process server must typically file a return of service, proof of service, or affidavit of service with the court, or provide one to the plaintiff to file. The return of service indicates the time and place at which service was effected, the person served, and any additional information needed to establish that service was properly made. It is signed by the process server, and operates as prima facie evidence that service of process was effectively made.

Arizona Court Rules also require that any return or affidavit of service filed by a process server other than a sheriff or constable shall clearly state the county in which the process server is registered. Many Arizona process servers include their certification number on their returns/affidavits. Certification numbers are assigned by the clerk of the superior court in each county.

== Process serving laws (United States) ==
Many states have process serving laws that govern the way service of process is effected, the licensing requirements to effect service, the forms to be used and the time deadlines that service of process may be accomplished upon individual respondents and corporations. These differences may be vast. For example, in New York, service of process may require licensing of the process server; in Pennsylvania, process may only be served by the sheriff or a sheriff's deputy in most cases (except in Philadelphia, where process may be served "by any competent adult"); and in New Jersey, process is effected if, after making an affidavit that diligent efforts to effect personal service had failed, the party sends two copies of the pleading by mail—one by regular mail and one by certified mail, return receipt requested—and either the certified mail receipt is returned signed or the certified mail envelope is returned unclaimed and the regular mail is not returned to the sender. Generally, there are specific procedures and rules for most courts, from local small claims courts to United States District courts. Each court has specific rules, forms, guidelines and procedures which must be followed in order to successfully effect service of process. Failure to follow these guidelines may deem the attempted service improper. Indeed, many defendants in court hearings use the affirmative defense of "I was not served" as an often successful line of defense in any lawsuit. Not surprisingly, this defense tends to be effective in many cases because service of process upon defendant did not follow legal procedure. As for United States federal courts, service of process rules are in the Federal Rules of Civil Procedure, upon which most state service of process laws are based.

=== Jurisdiction ===
It is universal that the laws of service of process must follow the laws that apply to the court that issues the process. A bias or confusion occurs in many jurisdictions where service is made. In Florida, for example, process servers seem to suggest Florida laws apply to all service of process made within the territory of Florida. In this reference, section 48.195 implies an authority of Florida process servers to serve foreign process. This was added to allow sheriffs to serve foreign process within limitations as the section provides, but it does not, and cannot give exclusivity, to state-sanctioned licensed approved process servers to foreign process. This interpretation, however prevalent and beneficial to Florida process servers, is false.

Florida governs only those processes that are issued from Florida courts. An example would be a Wisconsin court process to be served upon a person in Florida. Wisconsin statutes would dictate the service requirements to the Florida participant. Simply, a person must be uninterested, a resident of Florida, and over the age of 18. This is not a popular position as many process servers who have a local Florida license prefer, for reasons of economics, to be considered the only legitimate process server for such a cause. This Wisconsin example is in the majority for all states in the US regarding out of state service in their jurisdiction. There are however a small number of states, such as Arizona, that permit a person of one state (e.g. Arizona) to serve another person in another state (e.g. Florida). The aforementioned Arizona rule is an exception to the majority of other states that require a process server to be 18 and over and an uninvolved party to serve its process in another state. Arizona law has never been challenged on the grounds of sovereignty as Arizona's statutes appear to give its courts legislative and judicial authority for its people to serve a person in a foreign state.

In states where Indian reservations are located, the state generally has no legal jurisdiction over Indian territory – recognized tribes enjoy legal status as a sovereign nation. Thus a process server certified under the authority of the state (i.e. Arizona) cannot serve a party to a case while that person is on the reservation unless the tribal council consents to permit service.

=== Trespassing ===
In nearly every state of the United States, process servers are restricted from trespassing on property as a means of serving process. Such invasions, no matter how innocuous, are regarded as not only invalid, but illegal and may result in penalties for offenders. Gated communities and apartment buildings have created a difficulty for process servers; however, most are required to allow process servers to enter them. However, this fact may be overcome where the process server is in the direct employment of a law enforcement agency, such as the U.S. Marshals Service, a county sheriff's department, or other law enforcement agency having responsibility to serve documents.

In California, "Registered Process Servers" are granted "a limited exemption against trespassing in gated communities." This allows servers to enter a private property for a reasonable period of time to attempt service of process. In California, gated communities which are "staffed by a security guard, or where access is controlled, must allow a Registered Process Server to enter for service of process upon presenting valid identification, and indicating to which address the process server is going." This does not prevent the security guard from contacting the resident and alerting them that a process server is on his way to their residence.

(a) Notwithstanding any other provision of law, any person shall be granted access to a gated community ... for the purpose of performing lawful service of process, upon identifying to the guard the person or persons to be served, and upon displaying a current driver's license or other identification, and one of the follow: (1) a badge [applies to sheriffs and marshals] (2) evidence of current registration as a process server ... (b)This section shall only apply to a gated community which is staffed, at the time service of process is attempted, by a guard or other ... personnel assigned to control access ... it does not apply to a private residence that has posted no trespassing signs

— § 415.21 Access to gated communities.

In Washington, "Registered Process Servers" are granted a limited exemption or affirmative defense against trespassing:

The actor was attempting to serve legal process which includes any document required or allowed to be served upon persons or property, by any statute, rule, ordinance, regulation, or court order, excluding delivery by the mails of the United States. This defense applies only if the actor did not enter into a private residence or other building not open to the public and the entry onto the premises was reasonable and necessary for service of the legal process.

— RCW 9A.52.090 (4)

=== Deadlines ===
Most states have a deadline for completing service of process after filing of the summons and complaint. In New York, for example, service must be completed in 120 days after filing for almost all cases, and Hawaii state circuit courts require service in a civil lawsuit must be effected within six months from commencing suit.

=== Dies non juridicum ===
Some states prohibit the delivery or serving of documents on Sundays, holidays or election days (dies non juridicum). However, some states will allow the service of documents under special circumstances. One such circumstance is when the service of process is pursuant to a court order.

According to various laws, service of process cannot be performed on Sundays in Florida (unless with a court order), Maine, Massachusetts, New York, Rhode Island, South Dakota, Tennessee (unless with a court order), Texas, Virginia, or West Virginia. It can also not be performed on election days or at a place of religious service on Sunday in Michigan, or on holidays in Minnesota. Finally, in New York, process cannot be served on Saturday upon a person who keeps Saturday as holy time.

=== GPS certification ===
In 2011, New York's City Council enacted a regulation requiring process servers to use GPS to prove that they attempted to locate someone. The data is stored for seven years.

=== Sewer Service ===
The term "sewer service" refers to telling a court that a service of process was completed when it had not been, in order to legitimize a civil case. The case would then result in a default judgement because the defendant would not know to appear.

== See also ==
- Civil procedure
- Federal Rules of Civil Procedure
- Sheriffs in the United States
- United States Marshals Service
