= Hague Service Convention =

1965 multilateral treaty

Convention on the Service Abroad of Judicial and Extrajudicial Documents in Civil or Commercial Matters
- State party to the Convention State ratified, not yet in force
- Signed: 15 November 1965
- Location: (Netherlands) The Hague
- Effective: 10 February 1969
- Condition: 3 ratifications
- Parties: 84
- Depositary: Ministry of Foreign Affairs of the Kingdom of the Netherlands
- Citations: 658 U.N.T.S. 164
- Languages: English and French

Full text
- Convention on the Service Abroad of Judicial and Extrajudicial Documents in Civil or Commercial Matters at Wikisource

The Convention on the Service Abroad of Judicial and Extrajudicial Documents in Civil or Commercial Matters, more commonly called the Hague Service Convention, is a multilateral treaty that was adopted in The Hague, the Netherlands, on 15 November 1965 by member states of the Hague Conference on Private International Law. It came into existence to give litigants a reliable and efficient means of serving the documents on parties living, operating or based in another country. The provisions of the convention apply to service of process in civil and commercial matters but not criminal matters. Also, Article 1 states that the Convention shall not apply if the address of the person to be served with the document is not known.

== Diplomatic service via letters rogatory ==
For states that are not party to the Hague Service Convention, diplomatic channels are generally used for the service of legal documents. It is generally effected by a letter rogatory, which is a formal request to issue a judicial order from a court in the state where proceedings are underway to a court in another state. This procedure generally requires transmission of the document to be served from the originating court to the foreign ministry in the state of origin. The foreign ministry in the state of origin forwards the request to the foreign ministry in the destination state. The foreign ministry then forwards the documents to the local court. The local court then makes an order to allow for the service. Once service is made, a certificate of service would then pass through the same channels in reverse. Under a somewhat more streamlined procedure, courts can sometimes forward service requests to the foreign ministry or the foreign court directly, cutting out one or more steps in the process.

== Procedure ==
The Hague Service Convention established a more simplified means for parties to effect service in other contracting states. Under the convention, each contracting state is required to designate a central authority to accept incoming requests for service. A judicial officer who is competent to serve process in the state of origin is permitted to send request for service directly to the central authority of the state where service is to be made. Upon receiving the request, the central authority in the receiving state arranges for service in a manner permitted within the receiving state, typically through a local court. Once service is effected, the central authority sends a certificate of service to the judicial officer who made the request. Parties are required to use three standardized forms: a request for service, a summary of the proceedings (similar to a summons), and a certificate of service.

The main benefits of the Hague Service Convention over letters rogatory is that it is faster (requests generally take two to four months rather than six months to one year), it uses standardized forms that should be recognized by authorities in other states, and it is cheaper (in most cases) because service can be effected by a local attorney without hiring a foreign attorney to advise on foreign service procedures.

The Hague Service Convention does not prohibit a receiving state from permitting international service by methods otherwise authorized by domestic law. For example, a state could allow for service directly by mail or by personal service. States that permit parties to use these alternative means of service make a separate designation in the documents they file upon ratifying or acceding to the convention.

== Alternate methods of service ==
The Hague Convention provides various modes of process service of documents such as by postal channel or by diplomatic/consular agents, judicial officers, officials or other competent persons. These provisions are covered under Articles 8 to 10 and may or not be allowed by member countries as a valid mode of serving the documents in their territory. The method of serving the documents through a central agency (Article 5) is not optional but is binding on all the member countries. Service through a central agency usually takes a long time: 4 to 12 months. The convention gives relief to the litigants if they have not received certificate of service or delivery from the central agency even after waiting for six months. In such cases, the court may, if it considers that a reasonable time has elapsed, give its judgment. Also, in case of urgency, the court may issue a provisional order or protective measure even before six-month waiting period.

=== Central authority ===
Although the service is free, it may take 4 to 12 months for the central authority to process. The central authority decides which method is to be used. In many cases, a bailiff will be assigned by a local court to serve the documents and mail back the proof of service, but service by mail is also possible.

=== Service by mail ===
Service by mail is possible only in states that have not objected to that method under Article 10(a) of the convention and if the jurisdiction where the court case takes place allows it under its applicable law. It is therefore possible in France and the Netherlands but not in Germany, Switzerland, and South Korea, where incoming service is to be effected exclusively through the state's central authority.

In the United States, the interpretation of a provision in Article 10(a) has long been controversial, as the judiciary in some of its jurisdictions contended that service by mail was impossible because the word "send" rather than "serve" was used in the English-language version of the convention. The matter was finally resolved in May 2017 by the US Supreme Court in Water Splash, Inc. v. Menon, bringing the interpretation in line with parties in other US jurisdictions and the rest of the world.

== Relation with other instruments ==
Under the convention, states may conclude different agreements between them that take precedence over the convention. Thus, in the European Union (except for Denmark) other rules are applied instead of the convention.

== State parties ==
As of October 2024, 84 states are contracting parties of the Hague Service Convention.

State party	Signed	Ratified or acceded	Entry into force
Albania	—	1 November 2006	1 July 2007
Andorra	—	26 April 2017	1 December 2017
Antigua and Barbuda	—	1 May 1985	1 November 1981
Argentina	—	2 February 2001	2 December 2001
Armenia (Note: The provisions of the Convention do not apply between Armenia and Azerbaijan.)	—	27 June 2012	1 February 2013
Australia (Note: The Convention entered into force on 1 November 2010 for all of Australia's external territories.)	—	15 March 2010	1 November 2010
Austria	22 November 2019	14 July 2020	12 September 2020
Azerbaijan	—	17 February 2023	1 September 2023
Bahamas, The	—	17 June 1997	1 February 1998
Barbados	—	10 February 1969	1 October 1969
Belarus	—	6 June 1997	1 February 1998
Belgium	21 January 1966	19 November 1970	18 January 1971
Belize	—	8 September 2009	1 May 2010
Bosnia and Herzegovina	—	16 June 2008	1 February 2009
Botswana	—	10 February 1969	1 September 1969
Brazil	—	1 November 2018	1 June 2019
Bulgaria	—	23 November 1999	1 August 2000
Canada	—	26 September 1998	1 May 1999
China	—	6 May 1991	1 January 1992
Colombia	—	10 April 2013	1 November 2013
Costa Rica	—	16 March 2016	1 October 2016
Croatia	—	28 February 2006	1 November 2006
Cyprus	—	26 October 1982	1 June 1983
Czech Republic	—	28 January 1993	1 January 1993
Denmark	7 January 1969	2 August 1969	1 October 1969
Dominican Republic	—	21 March 2024	1 October 2024
Egypt	1 March 1966	12 December 1968	10 February 1969
El Salvador	—	21 March 2024	1 October 2024
Estonia	—	2 February 1996	1 October 1996
Finland	15 November 1965	11 November 1969	10 November 1969
France	12 January 1967	3 July 1972	1 September 1972
Georgia	—	31 May 2021	1 January 2022
Germany	15 November 1965	27 April 1979	26 June 1979
Greece	20 July 1983	20 July 1983	18 September 1983
Hungary	—	13 July 2004	1 April 2005
Iceland	—	10 November 2008	1 July 2009
India	—	23 November 2006	1 August 2007
Ireland	20 October 1989	5 April 1994	4 June 1994
Israel	25 November 1965	14 August 1972	13 October 1972
Italy	25 January 1979	25 November 1981	24 January 1982
Japan	12 March 1970	28 May 1970	27 July 1970
Kazakhstan	—	15 October 2015	1 June 2016
Korea, South	—	13 January 2000	1 August 2000
Kuwait	—	8 May 2002	1 December 2002
Latvia	—	28 March 1995	1 November 1995
Lithuania	—	2 August 2000	1 June 2001
Luxembourg	27 October 1971	9 July 1975	7 September 1975
Malawi	—	24 April 1972	1 December 1972
Malta	—	1 February 2011	1 October 2011
Marshall Islands	—	29 July 2020	1 February 2021
Mexico	—	2 November 1999	1 June 2000
Moldova	—	4 July 2012	1 February 2013
Monaco	—	1 March 2007	1 November 2007
Montenegro	—	16 January 2012	1 September 2012
Morocco	—	24 March 2011	1 November 2011
Netherlands (Note: The Convention entered into force on 27 July 1986 for Aruba.)	15 November 1965	3 November 1975	2 January 1976
Nicaragua	—	24 July 2019	1 February 2020
North Macedonia	—	23 December 2008	1 September 2009
Norway	15 October 1968	2 August 1969	1 October 1969
Pakistan	—	7 December 1988	1 August 1989
Paraguay	—	23 June 2023	1 January 2024
Philippines	—	3 March 2020	1 October 2020
Poland	—	13 February 1996	1 September 1996
Portugal	5 July 1971	27 December 1973	25 February 1974
Romania	—	21 August 2003	1 April 2004
Russia	—	1 May 2001	1 December 2001
Saint Vincent and the Grenadines	—	6 January 2005	27 October 1979
San Marino	—	15 April 2002	1 November 2002
Serbia	—	2 July 2010	1 February 2011
Seychelles	—	18 November 1980	1 July 1981
Singapore	—	16 May 2023	1 December 2023
Slovakia	—	15 March 1993	1 January 1993
Slovenia	—	18 September 2000	1 June 2001
Spain	21 October 1976	4 June 1987	3 August 1987
Sri Lanka	—	31 August 2000	1 June 2001
Sweden	4 February 1969	2 August 1969	1 October 1969
Switzerland	21 May 1985	2 November 1994	1 January 1995
Tunisia	—	10 July 2017	2 February 2018
Turkey	11 June 1968	28 February 1972	28 April 1972
Ukraine	—	1 February 2001	1 December 2001
United Kingdom (Note: The Convention entered into force on 19 July 1970 for Bermuda, the British Virgin Islands, the Cayman Islands, the Falkland Islands, Gibraltar, Guernsey, the Isle of Man, Jersey, Montserrat, the Pitcairn Islands, Saint Helena, and the Turks and Caicos Islands. It entered into force on 2 October 1982 for Anguilla.)	10 December 1965	17 November 1967	10 February 1969
United States (Note: The Convention entered into force for the Northern Mariana Islands on 30 May 1994.)	15 November 1965	24 August 1967	10 February 1969
Venezuela	—	29 October 1993	1 July 1994
Vietnam	—	16 March 2016	1 December 2016
