= Summons =

Legal order to attend proceedings

A summons (also known in England and Wales as a claim form or plaint note, and in the Australian state of New South Wales as a court attendance notice (CAN)) is a legal document issued by a court (a judicial summons) or by an administrative agency of government (an administrative summons) for various purposes.

== Judicial summons ==
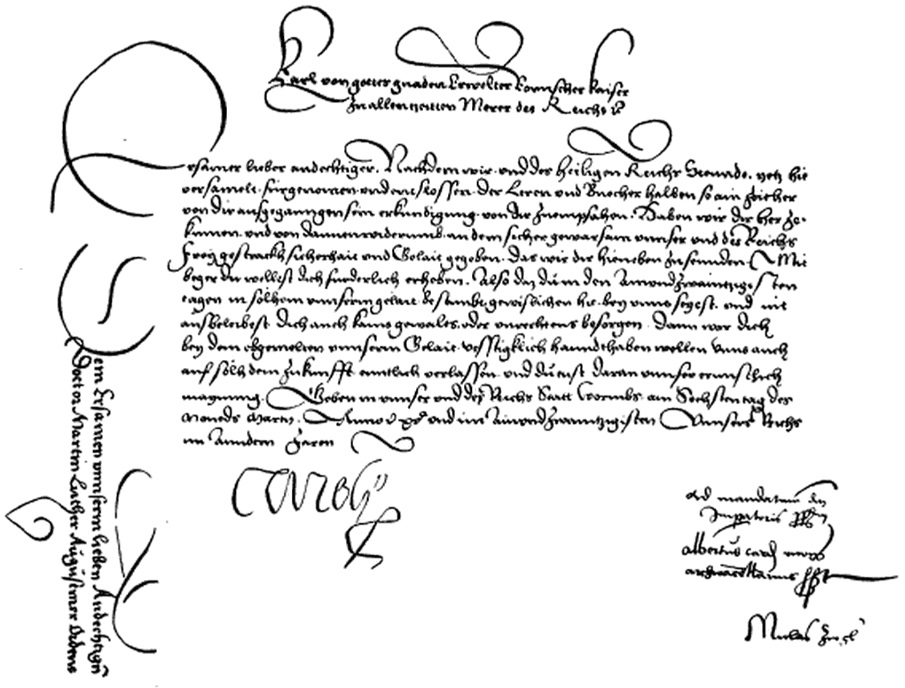
Summons for Martin Luther to appear at the 1521 Diet of Worms, signed by Charles V. The text on the left was on the reverse side.

A judicial summons is served on a person involved in a legal proceeding. Legal action may be in progress against the person, or the person's presence as witness may be required. In the former case, the summons will typically announce to the person to whom it is directed that a legal proceeding has been started against that person, and that a case has been initiated in the issuing court. In some jurisdictions, it may be drafted in legal English difficult for the layman to understand, while several U.S. states expressly require summonses to be drafted in plain English and that they must start with this phrase: "Notice! You have been sued."

The summons announces a date by which the person or persons summoned must either appear in court, or respond in writing to the court or the opposing party or parties. The summons is the descendant of the writ of the common law. It replaces the former procedure in common-law countries by which the plaintiff actually had to ask the sheriff to arrest the defendant in order for the court to obtain personal jurisdiction in both criminal and civil actions.

In some jurisdictions, while the summons still exists, it has been replaced with an order to show cause for many lawsuits.

== Types of summonses ==
=== Citation/claim (legal term) ===
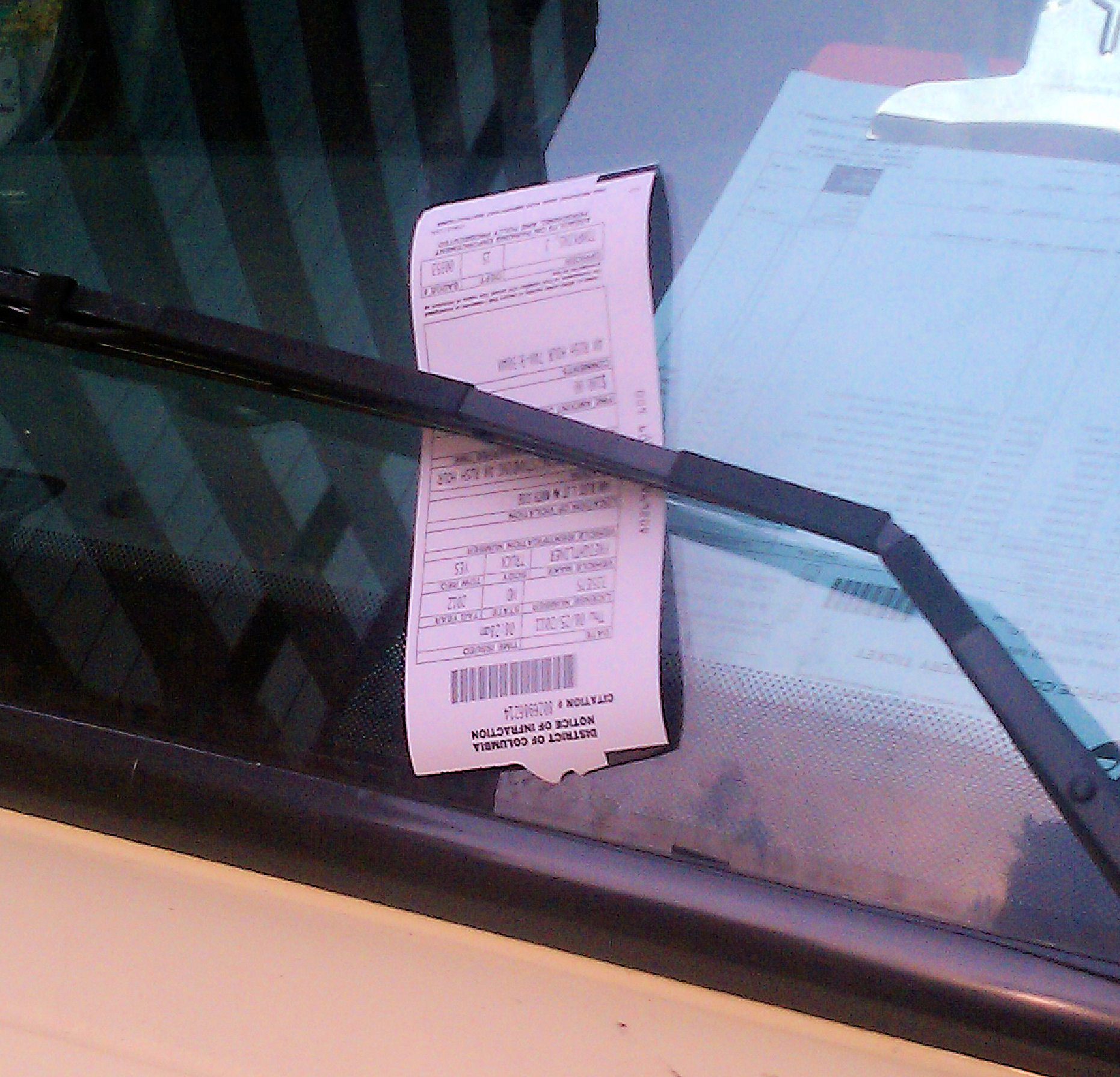
A parking ticket issued in Washington, D.C.

A citation, traffic violation ticket, or notice to appear is a type of summons prepared and served at the scene of the occurrence by a law enforcement official, compelling the appearance of a defendant before the local magistrate within a certain period of time to answer for a minor traffic infraction, misdemeanor, or other summary offence. Failure to appear within the allotted period of time is a separate crime of failure to appear.

In Australia, minor traffic and some summary offences are known as an infringement notice or a fine and can be dealt with by paying a particular monetary amount depending on the offence. The accused person has the right to have the matter heard in a court; if found not guilty the accused person pays nothing other than his legal costs (if any); if found guilty the accused person faces the prospect of a conviction for the offence and/or a substantial increase in the fine up to the maximum. For example, proceeding through a red light could go from A$353 up to A$2,200 if convicted in NSW. For more serious offences, a field court attendance notice is issued.

In the United Kingdom and Hong Kong, law enforcement officials may deal with certain minor offences, such as littering, by issuing a fixed penalty notice, colloquially called an "on-the-spot fine", although legally they are not fines. They allow the recipient to avoid going to court by paying a penalty fixed by statute. If such a notice is ignored or disputed, a court summons will be issued as for any other offence.

=== Civil summons ===
A civil summons is most often accompanied by a complaint. Depending on the type of summons, there is often an option to endorse a summons so that the entity being served may be identified. In the court system in California, for civil unlimited cases in the superior court, a summons will often have these options to endorse:

1. as an individual;
2. as the person sued under the fictitious name of __________________;
3. on behalf of (usually for a company); or
4. by personal delivery on __________

=== Administrative summons ===
One example of an administrative summons is found in the tax law of the United States. The Internal Revenue Code authorizes the U.S. Internal Revenue Service (IRS) to issue a summons for a taxpayer—or any person having custody of books of account relating to a business of a taxpayer—to appear before the U.S. Secretary of the Treasury or his delegate (generally, this means the IRS employee who issued the summons) at the time and place named in the summons. The person summoned may be required to produce books, papers, records, or other data, and to give testimony under oath before an IRS employee.

The IRS is also empowered to issue the section 7602 summons for the purpose of "inquiring into any offense connected with the administration or enforcement of the internal revenue laws".

The summons may be enforced by a court order, and the law provides a criminal penalty of up to one year in prison or a fine, or both, for failure to obey the summons, except that the person summoned may, to the extent applicable, assert a privilege against self incrimination or other evidentiary privileges, if applicable.

In the U.S. immigration court system, a "Notice to Appear" is an administrative summons ordering a respondent to appear before an immigration court for removal proceedings.

== Summonses by jurisdictions ==
=== Australia ===
In the Australian state of New South Wales (NSW) the service of a court attendance notice can be issued in a number of ways, the most common of which is by the NSW Police Force when charging someone after an arrest is made, a bail court attendance notice (with bail conditions) or regular court attendance notice is issued. Other methods the police use include via a paper form called a field court attendance notice (field CAN) which is issued to the accused person on the spot after an offence has been detected. Or by way of a future court attendance notice (future CAN), which replaced the old court issued summons and is served in person by police or sometimes by mail. In all of these cases, the CAN is filed at the court after it has been served.

=== England and Wales ===
In England and Wales, the various royal writs traditionally used to commence the forms of action were abolished by the Uniformity of Process Act 1832 (2 & 3 Will. 4. c. 39). They were consolidated into a writ of summons, which like its predecessors, was traditionally issued in the name of the monarch.

From 1832 to 1980, a writ of summons in England and Wales began with the name of the court, case number, the word "Between", and the names of the parties to the case. This was followed by the name and full title of the current monarch, the word "To:", the defendant's name and their city of residence, and then the royal command, starting with the royal we: "WE COMMAND YOU that within 14 days after service of this Writ on you, inclusive of the date of service, you do cause an appearance to be entered for you in an action at the suit of [plaintiff's name] and take notice that in default of you so doing the Plaintiff may proceed therein, and judgment may be given in your absence". Next came the word "Witness," then the name and title of the Lord Chancellor, and the date on which the writ was issued.

The traditional writ language was changed in 1980 at the insistence of Lord Chancellor Hailsham, who felt that a command from the monarch was too intimidating for ordinary laypeople.

Therefore, as of 1992, a writ of summons simply gave notice, in lieu of the traditional royal command: "This Writ of Summons has been issued against you by the above-named Plaintiff in respect of the claim set out on the back. Within 14 days after the service of this Writ upon you, counting the day of service, you must either satisfy the claim or return to the Court Office mentioned below the accompanying Acknowledgement of Service stating therein whether you intend to contest these proceedings." This was followed by a paragraph warning of the risk of entry of default judgment. The writ was no longer witnessed by the Lord Chancellor and in lieu of that simply stated which court office had issued the writ.

In 1999, the writ of summons was replaced with the claim form by the Civil Procedure Rules 1999 (CPR). This was part of the CPR's reforms to simplify legal terminology; at the same time, the plaintiff was renamed the claimant. Despite its name, the claim form may but is not required to present the details of the claim itself. The statement of claim (which had already replaced the complaint in England and Wales under the Rules of the Supreme Court) was replaced by another document known as particulars of claim. The claim form (Form N1) has space for "brief details of claim" on the first page, and then on the third page the claimant can either provide particulars of claim or indicate by tick box that they are "to follow" (that is, as a separate document). If they are "to follow" the particulars of claim must be served within 14 days of the claim form being served.

Unlike the traditional writ of summons, the notice to the defendant about when to respond is no longer provided on the claim form itself. The CPR is oddly silent about this, but the claimant is generally expected to concurrently serve Form N1C, Notes to defendant on replying to the claim form, which does warn that the defendant must respond within 14 days of service of particulars of claim.

In criminal matters, either a requisition, summons or warrant is issued to initiate criminal proceedings.

=== Republic of Korea ===
In the Republic of Korea, a criminal summons may come from the Korean Prosecution Services or a Court of Law and is a manner to initiate criminal proceedings or call a witness in for questioning. A summons may be served on an individual within Korea or that is abroad.

=== United States ===
In most U.S. jurisdictions, the service of a valid summons is in most cases required for the court to have jurisdiction over the party who is being summoned. The process by which a summons is served is called service of process. The form and content of service in the federal courts is governed by Rule 4 of the Federal Rules of Civil Procedure, and the rules of many state courts are similar. The federal summons is usually issued by the clerk of the court. In many states, the summons may be issued by an attorney, but some states use filing as the means to commence an action and in those states, the attorney must first file the summons in duplicate before it becomes effective. One or more copies are stamped by the court clerk with the court seal and returned to the attorney, who then uses it to actually serve the defendants. Other jurisdictions may only require that the summons be filed after it is served on the defendants. New York State is distinguished by its permissive filing system, in which the summons or complaint need not be filed at all.

== See also ==
- Subpoena

- subpoena ad testificandum
- subpoena duces tecum
