= Edmond Lareau =

Canadian politician

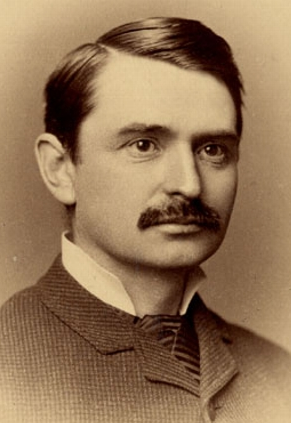

Member of the Legislative Assembly of Quebec for Rouville
- In office 1886–1890
- Preceded by: Étienne Poulin
- Succeeded by: Alfred Girard

Personal details
- Born: March 13, 1848 Mount Johnson (Mont-Saint-Grégoire), Canada East
- Died: April 21, 1890 (aged 42) Montreal, Quebec
- Party: Liberal

Edmond Lareau, QC (March 13, 1848 – April 21, 1890) was a lawyer, author, journalist and political figure in Quebec. He represented Rouville in the Legislative Assembly of Quebec from 1886 to 1890 as a Liberal.

== Biography ==
He was born Pierre-Bénoni-Evremond Lareau in Mount Johnson, Canada East, the son of Pierre-Bénoni Lareau and Odile Sylvestre, and was educated at Collège Sainte-Marie-de-Monnoir and Victoria College in Cobourg, Ontario. Lareau was admitted to the Quebec bar in 1870 and set up practice in Montreal. He was granted a Bachelor of Civil Law by McGill College in 1874. Lareau became a professor of law at the college. He was named Queen's Counsel in 1879. In 1880, he married Marguerite Robillard. He was an unsuccessful candidate for a seat in the House of Commons in 1882.

Lareau contributed to the journals La Patrie and Le Temps and was coeditor of the Lower Canada Jurist with John Sprott Archibald. He was also editor for Le Pays from 1870 to 1872. Lareau published a number of works on the subject of history and law, including:

- the Le droit civil canadien suivant l’ordre établi par les codes, précédé d’une histoire générale du droit canadien, with Gonzalve Doutre (1872)
- the Histoire de la littérature canadienne, a history of Canadian literature (1874).
- the Histoire du droit canadien depuis les origines de la colonie jusqu’à nos jours, a two volume history of Canadian law published in 1888 and 1889.

He died in Montreal at the age of 42 and was buried in the Notre Dame des Neiges Cemetery.
