= 2015 Danish European Union opt-out referendum =

Danish European Union opt-out referendum
- 3 December 2015
- Proposed Law to change the justice opt-out to a case-by-case opt-in. (Note: The ballot question was the name of the proposal.)

Results
Choice	Votes	%
Yes	1,375,862	46.89%
No	1,558,437	53.11%
Valid votes	2,934,299	98.13%
Invalid or blank votes	55,962	1.87%
Total votes	2,990,261	100.00%
Registered voters/turnout	4,153,041	72%
- Results by electoral district
- Source: Statistics Denmark

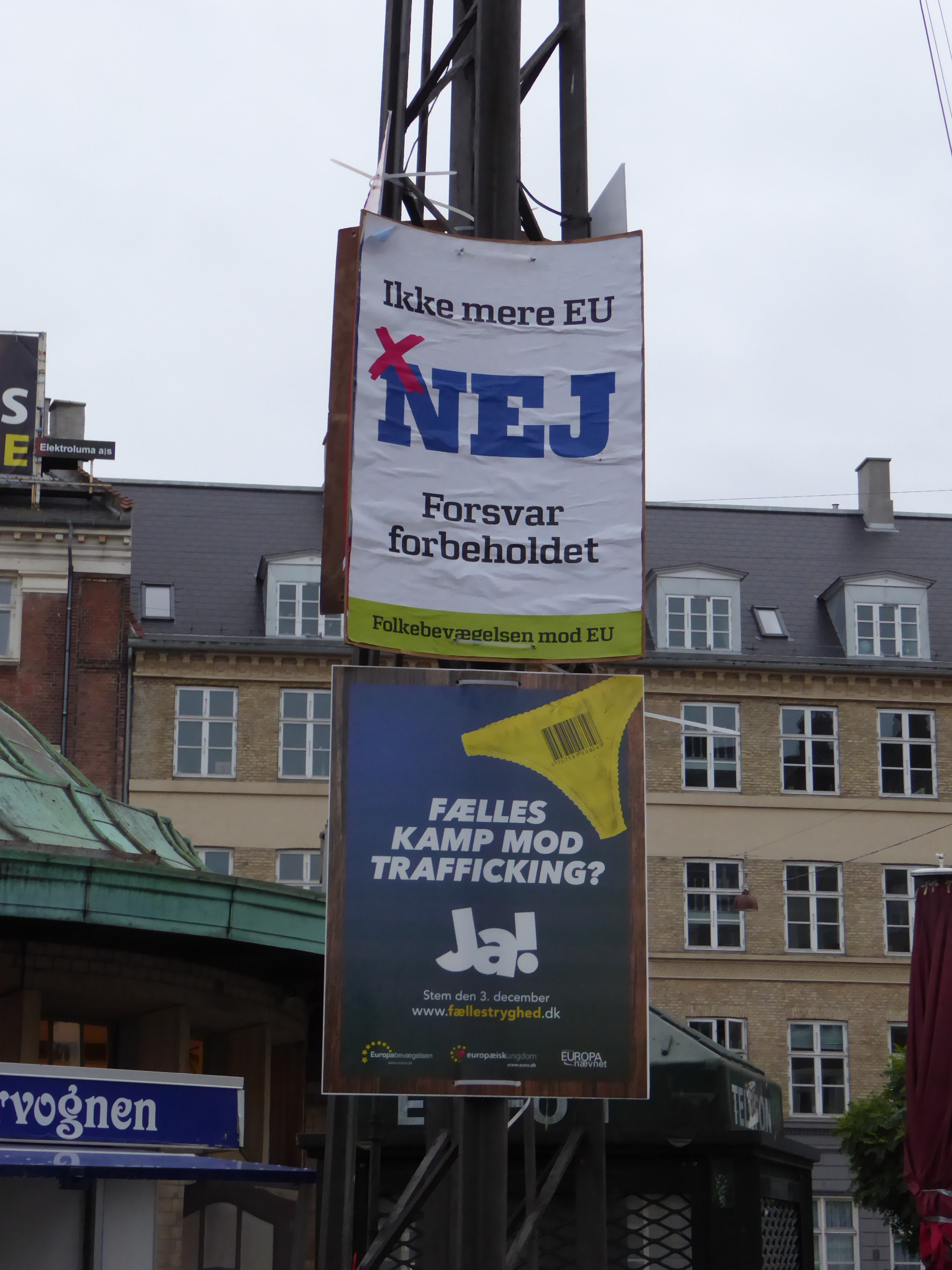
Election posters in Copenhagen

A referendum on one of the country's opt-outs from the European Union was held in Denmark on 3 December 2015. Specifically, the referendum was on whether to convert Denmark's current full opt-out on home and justice matters into an opt-out with case-by-case opt-in similar to those held by Ireland and the United Kingdom. Approval of the referendum was needed for Denmark to remain in Europol under the new rules. However, it was rejected by 53% of voters.

== Background ==
After Danish voters rejected the Maastricht Treaty in a 1992 referendum, the Edinburgh Agreement that was reached granted four exceptions to Denmark, one of which concerning Justice and Home Affairs. The Danish people subsequently approved the Maastricht Treaty in a 1993 referendum.

Several Danish governments had considered holding a referendum on abolishing certain opt-outs. When it became clear that, under new rules, Denmark would have to leave Europol due to its full opt-out, the two main political parties agreed to hold a referendum after the 2015 general election. The second Lars Løkke Rasmussen government that was formed following the election subsequently decided on 21 August 2015 to hold a referendum on 3 December.

=== Consequences in legislation ===
==== List of legislation ====
The following are EU laws affected by the opt-outs, that the proponents wanted to opt into:

===== Police and criminal law =====
- Directive 2014/41/EU, EUR-lex, eu.dk, Direktivet om den europæiske efterforskningskendelse i straffesager, regarding the European Investigation Order in criminal matters
- Directive 2011/99/EU (de), EUR-lex, eu.dk, Direktivet om den europæiske beskyttelsesordre, regarding the European protection order
- Regulation 606/2013 (de), EUR-lex, eu.dk, Forordningen om den civilretlige beskyttelsesordre, regarding the European protection order
- Directive 2011/36/EU (de), EUR-lex, eu.dk, Menneskehandelsdirektivet, regarding preventing and combating trafficking in human beings and protecting its victims
- Directive 2011/92/EU, EUR-lex, eu.dk, Direktivet om seksuelt misbrug af børn, regarding combating the sexual abuse and sexual exploitation of children and child pornography
- Directive 2013/40/EU, EUR-lex, eu.dk, Cybercrimedirektivet, regarding attacks against information systems
- Directive 2014/57/EU, EUR-lex, eu.dk, Direktivet om markedsmisbrug, regarding criminal sanctions for market abuse
- Directive 2014/62/EU, EUR-lex, eu.dk, Direktivet om falskmøntneri, regarding the protection of the euro and other currencies against counterfeiting by criminal law

===== Civil law and commercial law =====
- Regulation 1346/2000 (de), EUR-lex, eu.dk, Konkursforordningen, regarding insolvency proceedings
- Regulation 1206/2001, EUR-lex, eu.dk, Bevisoptagelsesforordningen, regarding cooperation between the courts of the Member States in the taking of evidence in civil or commercial matters
- Regulation 1896/2006, EUR-lex, eu.dk, Betalingspåkravsforordningen, creating a European order for payment procedure
- Regulation 861/2007, EUR-lex, eu.dk, Småkravsforordningen, establishing a European Small Claims Procedure
- Regulation 805/2004, EUR-lex, eu.dk, Forordningen om indførelse af et europæisk tvangsfuldbyrdelsesdokument for ubestridte krav, creating a European Enforcement Order for uncontested claims
- Directive 2008/52/EC (de), EUR-lex, eu.dk, Mæglingsdirektivet, regarding mediation in civil and commercial matters
- Regulation 593/2008, EUR-lex, eu.dk, Rom I-forordningen om lovvalg inden for kontrakt
- Regulation 864/2007, EUR-lex, eu.dk, Rom II-forordningen om lovvalg uden for kontrakt
- Regulation 662/2009, EUR-lex, eu.dk, Forordningen om bilaterale aftaler om lovvalgsregler, establishing a procedure for the negotiation and conclusion of agreements between Member States and third countries on particular matters concerning the law applicable to contractual and non-contractual obligations
- Regulation 655/2014, EUR-lex, eu.dk, Kontosikringsforordningen, establishing a European Account Preservation Order procedure to facilitate cross-border debt recovery in civil and commercial matters

===== Family law =====
- Regulation 650/2012 (de), EUR-lex, eu.dk, Arveretsforordningen, regarding jurisdiction, applicable law, recognition and enforcement of decisions and acceptance and enforcement of authentic instruments in matters of succession and on the creation of a European Certificate of Succession
- Regulation 2201/2003, EUR-lex, eu.dk, Bruxelles IIa-forordningen, regarding jurisdiction and the recognition and enforcement of judgments in matrimonial matters and the matters of parental responsibility
- Regulation 4/2009, EUR-lex, eu.dk, Underholdspligtsforordningen, regarding jurisdiction, applicable law, recognition and enforcement of decisions and cooperation in matters relating to maintenance obligations
- Regulation 664/2009, EUR-lex, eu.dk, Forordningen om bilaterale familieretlige aftaler, establishing a procedure for the negotiation and conclusion of agreements between Member States and third countries concerning jurisdiction, recognition and enforcement of judgments and decisions in matrimonial matters, matters of parental responsibility and matters relating to maintenance obligations, and the law applicable to matters relating to maintenance obligations

===== Proposals =====
- Europol, eu.dk
- PNR, eu.dk
- Eurojust, eu.dk

== Campaign ==
A "yes" vote was supported by the governing Venstre, the Social Democrats, the Conservative People's Party, The Alternative, the Social Liberal Party and the Socialist People's Party. A "no" vote was supported by the Danish People's Party, the Liberal Alliance, the Red–Green Alliance, the People's Movement against the EU and the Young Conservatives.

== Opinion polls ==
Date(s)	Polling agency	Sample	For	Against	Undecided	Lead
1–2 December 2015	Megafon/TV2	1,927	39.4%	42.2%	18.4%	2.8%
30 November–1 December 2015	Gallup/Berlingske	1,630	37%	42%	21%	5%
25 November–1 December 2015	Wilke/Jyllandsposten	2,000	37.4%	41.1%	21.5%	3.7%
22–30 November 2015	Epinion/DR	2,778	32%	36%	31%	4%
26–29 November 2015	Megafon/TV2	1,000	35%	40%	25%	5%
25–26 November 2015	Gallup/Berlingske	1,035	34%	38%	25%	4%
20–23 November 2015	Megafon/TV2	1,031	39%	38%	23%	1%
18–23 November 2015	Norstat/Altinget	1,002	34%	41%	25%	7%
16–22 November 2015	Epinion/DR	2,373	32%	29%	34%	3%
November 2015	Voxmeter/Ritzau	1,009	34.8%	32.1%	33.1%	2.7%
November 2015	Voxmeter/Ritzau	1,010	33.0%	30.5%	36.5%	2.5%
November 2015	Voxmeter/Ritzau	1,005	26.8%	30.4%	42.7%	3.6%
26–28 October 2015	Megafon/Politiken	ca. 1,000	32%	28%	40%	4%
22–26 October 2015	Norstat/Altinget	1,000	31%	37%	33%	6%
14–21 October 2015	Epinion/DR Nyheder	1,005	29%	28%	39%	1%
September 2015	Voxmeter/Ritzau	1,009	26%	37%	36%	9%
21–24 September 2015	Megafon/Politiken	ca. 1,000	41%	32%	27%	9%
16–21 September 2015	Norstat/Altinget	1,001	31%	36%	33%	5%
24–26 August 2015	Megafon/Politiken	ca. 1,000	41%	27%	33%	14%
21–24 August 2015	Norstat/Altinget	1,000	34%	33%	32%	1%
June 2015	Norstat/Altinget	ca. 1,000	38%	31%	31%	7%
May 2015	Norstat/Altinget	ca. 1,000	40%	30%	30%	10%
April 2015	Norstat/Altinget	ca. 1,000	36%	29%	34%	7%
12–17 March 2015	Norstat/Altinget	1,001	38%	27%	35%	11%
3 February 2015	Norstat/Altinget	ca. 1,000	39%	27%	34%	12%
12 January 2015	ukendt/Børsen	ca. 1,000	43%	41%	16%	2%
January 2015	Norstat/Altinget	ca. 1,000	39%	27%	34%	12%

== Results ==
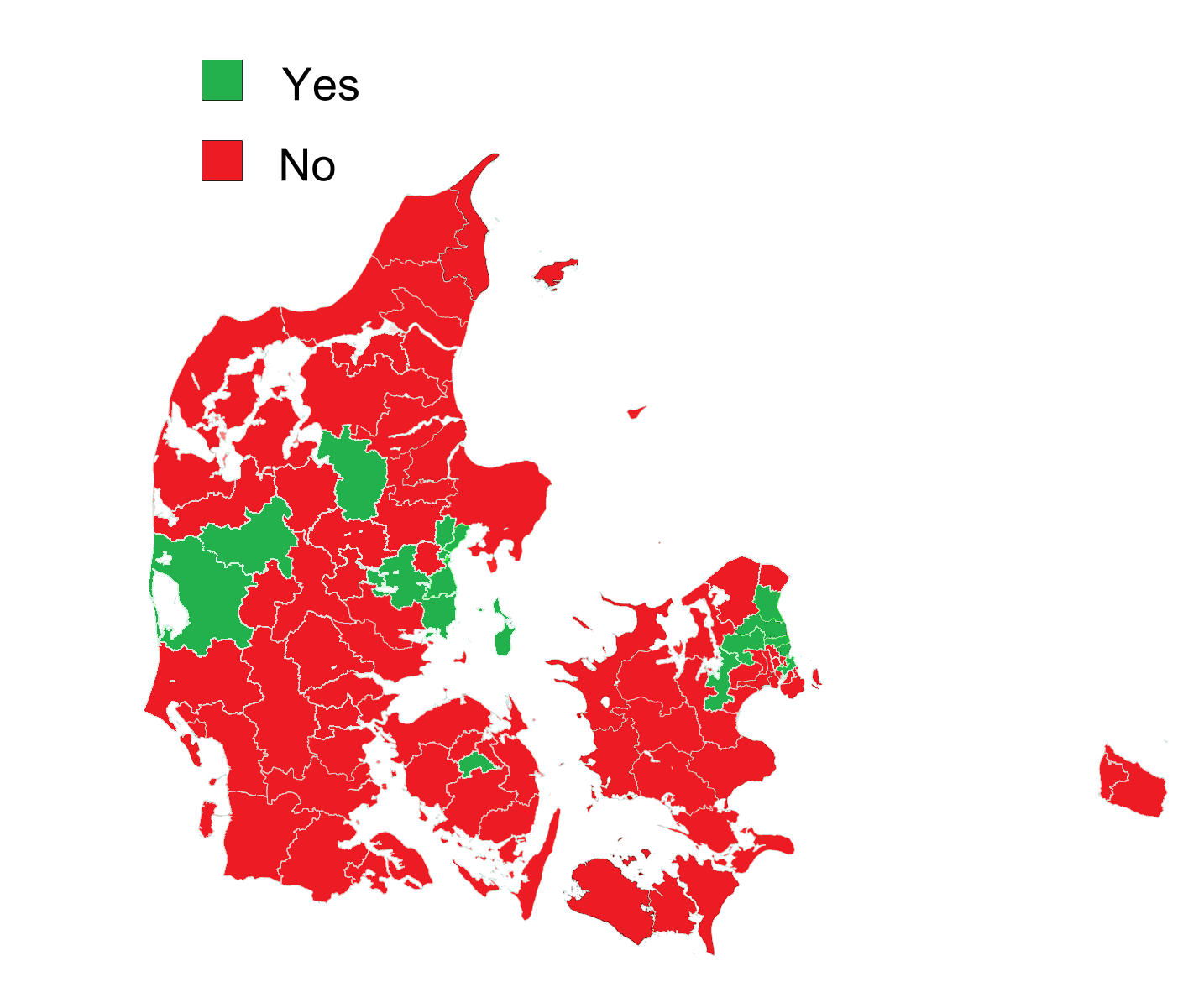
Results by electoral district No Yes

Choice	Votes	%
For	1,375,862	46.89
Against	1,558,437	53.11
Invalid/blank votes	55,962	–
Total	2,990,261	100
Registered voters/turnout	4,153,041	72.00
Source: Statistics Denmark

Results by constituency
District	Yes		No		Valid	Blank	Invalid	Total
District	Votes	%	Votes	%	Valid	Blank	Invalid	Total
Capital Region	442,179	50.4	435,348	49.6	877,527	15,674	2,587	895,788
Copenhagen	176,085	50.3	174,291	49.7	350,376	8,202	1,286	359,864
1. Østerbro	21,103	56.4	16,294	43.6	37,397	851	136	38,384
2. Sundbyvester	14,321	49.0	14,927	51.0	29,248	634	110	29,992
3. Indre By	15,964	58.4	11,381	41.6	27,345	611	88	28,044
4. Sundbyøster	11,263	44.6	13,986	55.4	25,249	572	118	25,939
5. Nørrebro	18,355	49.8	18,527	50.2	36,882	1,305	154	38,341
6. Bispebjerg	9,239	42.3	12,599	57.7	21,838	580	109	22,527
7. Brønshøj	17,239	47.5	19,085	52.5	36,324	738	156	37,218
8. Valby	10,852	45.8	12,830	54.2	23,682	567	83	24,332
9. Vesterbro	14,468	50.1	14,411	49.9	28,879	823	116	29,818
10. Falkoner	16,821	60.5	11,002	39.5	27,823	625	69	28,517
11. Slots	14,327	55.2	11,628	44.8	25,955	543	85	26,583
12. Tårnby	12,133	40.8	17,621	59.2	29,754	353	62	30,169
Copenhagen Surrounding Areas	124,928	48.2	134,156	51.8	259,084	3,748	619	263,451
1. Gentofte	25,149	65.9	13,016	34.1	38,165	527	123	38,815
2. Lyngby	17,511	60.8	11,279	39.2	28,790	490	94	29,374
3. Gladsaxe	15,905	48.9	16,589	51.1	32,494	580	54	33,128
4. Rødovre	13,719	42.6	18,466	57.4	32,185	499	70	32,754
5. Hvidovre	9,897	39.1	15,391	60.9	25,288	334	38	25,660
6. Brøndby	12,753	40.9	18,443	59.1	31,196	342	66	31,604
7. Taastrup	14,767	42.1	20,294	57.9	35,061	485	93	35,639
8. Ballerup	15,227	42.4	20,678	57.6	35,905	491	81	36,477
North Zealand	131,228	53.3	115,130	46.7	246,358	3,329	596	250,283
1. Helsingør	15,438	47.9	16,814	52.1	32,252	467	106	32,825
2. Fredensborg	20,905	60.1	13,901	39.9	34,806	396	47	35,249
3. Hillerød	24,256	49.4	24,883	50.6	49,139	719	134	49,992
4. Frederikssund	17,403	42.6	23,404	57.4	40,807	496	107	41,410
5. Egedal	24,756	55.1	20,150	44.9	44,906	645	96	45,647
6. Rudersdal	28,470	64.1	15,978	35.9	44,448	606	106	45,160
Bornholm	9,938	45.8	11,771	54.2	21,709	395	86	22,190
1. Rønne	4,936	46.8	5,621	53.2	10,557	204	49	10,810
2. Aakirkeby	5,002	44.9	6,150	55.1	11,152	191	37	11,380
Zealand and South Denmark Region	478,225	44.3	601,656	55.7	1,079,881	15,605	2,963	1,098,449
Zealand	191,179	43.0	252,984	57.0	444,163	5,777	1,101	451,041
1. Lolland	8,289	36.3	14,577	63.7	22,866	249	79	23,194
2. Guldborgsund	13,646	40.4	20,093	59.6	33,739	426	94	34,259
3. Vordingborg	10,779	41.5	15,177	58.5	25,956	336	72	26,364
4. Næstved	18,613	42.4	25,269	57.6	43,882	586	111	44,579
5. Faxe	12,957	40.8	18,794	59.2	31,751	379	78	32,208
6. Køge	21,260	45.4	25,545	54.6	46,805	656	88	47,549
7. Greve	17,700	46.9	20,041	53.1	37,741	409	101	38,251
8. Roskilde	23,885	51.9	22,157	48.1	46,042	829	111	46,982
9. Holbæk	15,825	43.3	20,724	56.7	36,549	453	101	37,103
10. Kalundborg	17,400	38.7	27,582	61.3	44,982	516	114	45,612
11. Ringsted	14,490	43.5	18,836	56.5	33,326	477	87	33,890
12. Slagelse	16,335	40.3	24,189	59.7	40,524	461	65	41,050
Funen	120,588	45.9	141,942	54.1	262,530	4,570	801	267,901
1. Odense Øst	14,779	44.9	18,159	55.1	32,938	749	116	33,803
2. Odense Vest	13,938	45.7	16,594	54.3	30,532	581	112	31,225
3. Odense Syd	19,258	52.5	17,428	47.5	36,686	731	141	37,558
4. Assens	10,246	44.8	12,646	55.2	22,892	355	57	23,304
5. Middelfart	17,315	46.8	19,716	53.2	37,031	534	75	37,640
6. Nyborg	13,713	44.1	17,374	55.9	31,087	466	92	31,645
7. Svendborg	16,652	42.5	22,542	57.5	39,194	667	111	39,972
8. Faaborg	14,687	45.7	17,483	54.3	32,170	487	97	32,754
South Jutland	166,458	44.6	206,730	55.4	373,188	5,258	1,061	379,507
1. Sønderborg	17,489	44.4	21,904	55.6	39,393	519	114	40,026
2. Aabenraa	13,561	44.6	16,860	55.4	30,421	386	78	30,885
3. Tønder	8,885	44.5	11,080	55.5	19,965	314	59	20,338
4. Esbjerg By	12,376	38.1	20,118	61.9	32,494	464	111	33,069
5. Esbjerg Omegn	12,940	45.1	15,742	54.9	28,682	372	68	29,122
6. Varde	12,506	47.3	13,937	52.7	26,443	367	53	26,863
7. Vejen	16,146	45.0	19,742	55.0	35,888	479	122	36,489
8. Vejle Nord	13,799	49.2	14,252	50.8	28,051	492	78	28,621
9. Vejle Syd	13,401	46.1	15,678	53.9	29,079	488	109	29,676
10. Fredericia	10,838	41.0	15,582	59.0	26,420	308	62	26,790
11. Kolding Nord	10,794	49.5	11,022	50.5	21,816	298	60	22,174
12. Kolding Syd	10,702	43.7	13,792	56.3	24,494	307	58	24,859
13. Haderslev	13,021	43.3	17,021	56.7	30,042	464	89	30,595
Mid and North Jutland Region	455,458	46.6	521,433	53.4	976,891	16,937	2,196	996,024
East Jutland	194,320	48.2	208,665	51.8	402,985	7,947	958	411,890
1. Århus Syd	22,925	54.7	18,989	45.3	41,914	994	105	43,013
2. Århus Vest	19,077	48.6	20,148	51.4	39,225	849	99	40,173
3. Århus Nord	21,280	50.8	20,605	49.2	41,885	1,154	107	43,146
4. Århus Øst	26,734	56.8	20,307	43.2	47,041	1,332	135	48,508
5. Djurs	18,159	42.8	24,222	57.2	42,381	594	80	43,055
6. Randers Nord	9,693	40.1	14,496	59.9	24,189	295	56	24,540
7. Randers Syd	10,884	42.5	14,740	57.5	25,624	369	53	26,046
8. Favrskov	12,306	48.3	13,149	51.7	25,455	460	55	25,970
9. Skanderborg	23,967	51.8	22,273	48.2	46,240	852	76	47,168
10. Horsens	18,395	41.9	25,533	58.1	43,928	675	117	44,720
11. Hedensted	10,900	43.4	14,203	56.6	25,103	373	75	25,551
West Jutland	131,936	48.5	139,993	51.5	271,929	4,341	600	276,870
1. Struer	10,984	45.2	13,336	54.8	24,320	335	37	24,692
2. Skive	11,311	45.6	13,470	54.4	24,781	373	63	25,217
3. Viborg Vest	12,634	49.5	12,913	50.5	25,547	432	61	26,040
4. Viborg Øst	11,707	50.9	11,290	49.1	22,997	346	60	23,403
5. Silkeborg Nord	11,123	47.1	12,479	52.9	23,602	361	48	24,011
6. Silkeborg Syd	12,658	51.3	12,013	48.7	24,671	429	66	25,166
7. Ikast	9,271	45.3	11,196	54.7	20,467	338	47	20,852
8. Herning Syd	9,905	47.2	11,086	52.8	20,991	339	60	21,390
9. Herning Nord	11,997	50.2	11,920	49.8	23,917	362	39	24,318
10. Holstebro	15,383	49.3	15,826	50.7	31,209	563	63	31,835
11. Ringkøbing	14,963	50.8	14,464	49.2	29,427	463	56	29,946
North Jutland	129,202	42.8	172,775	57.2	301,977	4,649	638	307,264
1. Frederikshavn	12,384	37.5	20,674	62.5	33,058	393	75	33,526
2. Hjørring	14,269	42.5	19,325	57.5	33,594	503	88	34,185
3. Brønderslev	16,328	41.5	23,022	58.5	39,350	529	81	39,960
4. Thisted	15,167	44.6	18,845	55.4	34,012	527	71	34,610
5. Himmerland	15,516	45.5	18,608	54.5	34,124	517	53	34,694
6. Mariagerfjord	9,464	42.7	12,687	57.3	22,151	298	37	22,486
7. Aalborg Øst	16,666	41.7	23,275	58.3	39,941	743	84	40,768
8. Aalborg Vest	15,759	47.6	17,371	52.4	33,130	561	62	33,753
9. Aalborg Nord	13,649	41.8	18,968	58.2	32,617	578	87	33,282
Denmark	1,375,862	46.9	1,558,437	53.1	2,934,299	48,216	7,746	2,990,261
Source: Danmarks Statistik
