= International litigation =

Legal proceedings involving multiple jurisdictions

International litigation, sometimes called transnational litigation, is the practice of litigation in connection with disputes among businesses or individuals residing or based in different countries.

The main difference between international litigation and domestic litigation is that, in the former, certain issues are more likely to be of significance — such as personal jurisdiction, service of process, evidence from abroad, and enforcement of judgments.

== Jurisdiction ==
Although there are differences among the jurisdictional statutes of many American states, they all are subject to the due process requirements imposed by the Constitution of the United States. As a result, most American lawyers who are familiar with general principles of jurisdiction in one or more states of the US are able to guide their clients through jurisdictional issues in connection with disputes among litigants from different states.

The situation is different with respect to jurisdictional principles in the international context. The first difference concerns long-arm jurisdiction, which is the statutory grant of jurisdiction to local courts over out-of-state defendants. A long-arm statute authorizes a court in a state to exercise jurisdiction over an out-of-state defendant. Without a long-arm statute, the courts in a state might not have personal jurisdiction over an out-of-state defendant. A state's authorization to exercise jurisdiction is limited by the federal Constitution. The use of a long-arm statute is usually considered constitutional where the defendant has certain minimum contacts with the forum state and there has been reasonable notice of the action against that defendant.

Second, many countries take the view that American concepts of long-arm jurisdiction are too broad, and courts of such countries will not recognize judgments from American courts based on the exercise of American long-arm jurisdiction.

Looking at the issue from the non-American perspective, courts in some countries exercise jurisdiction based upon principles that American courts would consider unfair and repugnant to American law.

For example, in some countries, such as England and Israel, a court may exercise jurisdiction over a defendant that is considered to be a "necessary or proper" party in a case against a local defendant. It is not clear that such a jurisdictional basis would be upheld by American courts when the non-US judgment-creditor seeks to enforce in the United States.

== Service of process ==
In every lawsuit, the plaintiff must effect service of process upon the defendant(s). In the international context, the issue of service of process is more complex.

In the United States, service of process is routinely carried out by private lawyers or their agents. In contrast, many other countries consider the activity of serving process in a judicial proceeding to be one appropriate only for the government or an arm of the government.

As a result of differing approaches to the issue of service of process, several nations signed the Hague Service Convention (1965), under which each member nation is required to establish a Central Authority to receive, review, and execute requests from foreign courts for carrying out service of process.

Most countries that are signatories to the Hague Service Convention will accept requests for service that are signed by the lawyer for the plaintiff (claimant). Two exceptions are the UK and Israel.

Any lawyer who ignores the international aspects of service of process when suing a non-US defendant might find that the resulting judgment cannot be enforced where the defendants' assets are available.

== Evidence ==
Under the Federal Rules of Civil Procedure, a lawyer licensed in one federal district may execute a subpoena to obtain documents or testimony from a witness located in a (distant) federal district.

In contrast to the domestic situation, when a party to an international dispute needs to obtain evidence located in a foreign country, that party will usually need to make a request of the local court for it (the court) to issue a Letter of Request pursuant to the Hague Evidence Convention. Under the HEC, each member state is required to designate a Central Authority to receive, review, and carry out incoming requests to obtain evidence from persons (or other entities) located in the receiving country.

Litigants before non-US tribunals may request the assistance of American courts to obtain evidence, through Section 1782 Discovery. The use of Section 1782 has increased in recent years.

== Trial considerations ==
Once a lawsuit proceeds past the discovery stage and is ready for trial, the differences between domestic litigation and international litigation are much less pronounced. Nonetheless, there are special issues involving non-US litigants.

Depending upon the language sophistication of the witnesses on behalf of the non-US party, it might be necessary to arrange for an interpreter to translate trial testimony. Interpreters cost money, which increases the costs of the trial.

== Recognition and enforcement ==
In the domestic US context, the recognition of judgments is governed by the Full Faith and Credit Clause of the federal Constitution.

Full faith and credit does not apply to non-US judgments.

The United States is not a party to any multilateral treaty governing the recognition of foreign judgments. Nonetheless, the approach of American courts to the recognition of non-US judgments has been a liberal one, ever since the US Supreme Court's decision in Hilton v. Guyot.

Most states in the US have enacted the Uniform Foreign Money-Judgments Recognition Act, which governs the recognition of non-US judgments.

As a general rule, under the Uniform Act, grounds for non-recognition can be predicated upon:

- Lack of conclusiveness: if the judgment was rendered under a system which does not provide impartial tribunals or procedures compatible with the requirements of due process of law.
- the foreign court did not have personal jurisdiction over the defendant.
- The foreign court did not have jurisdiction over the subject matter;
- The defendant in the proceedings in the foreign court did not receive notice of the proceedings in sufficient time to enable him to defend;
- The judgment was obtained by fraud;
- The cause of action on which the judgment is based is repugnant to the public policy of the state where enforcement is sought;
- The judgment conflicts with another final and conclusive judgment;
- The proceeding in the foreign court was contrary to an agreement between the parties under which the dispute in question was to be settled otherwise than by proceedings in that court; or
- In the case of jurisdiction based only on personal service, the foreign court was a seriously inconvenient forum for the trial of the action; or
- The judgment seeks to enforce the revenue and taxation laws of a foreign jurisdiction.

== Other considerations ==
Some states of the US require foreign corporations to deposit "security" when filing suit in their courts. Some other states require foreign corporations to register to do business as a condition to suing.

In cases in federal court, a witness based outside the United States may execute an affidavit (or declaration) pursuant to 28 U.S.C. section 1746 without having his/her signature notarized. This procedure makes federal court more attractive to a litigant that expects to need to rely upon witnesses who are not based in the United States.

== See also ==
- Judicial interpretation
