= Alice Jill Edwards =

Australian human rights lawyer and academic

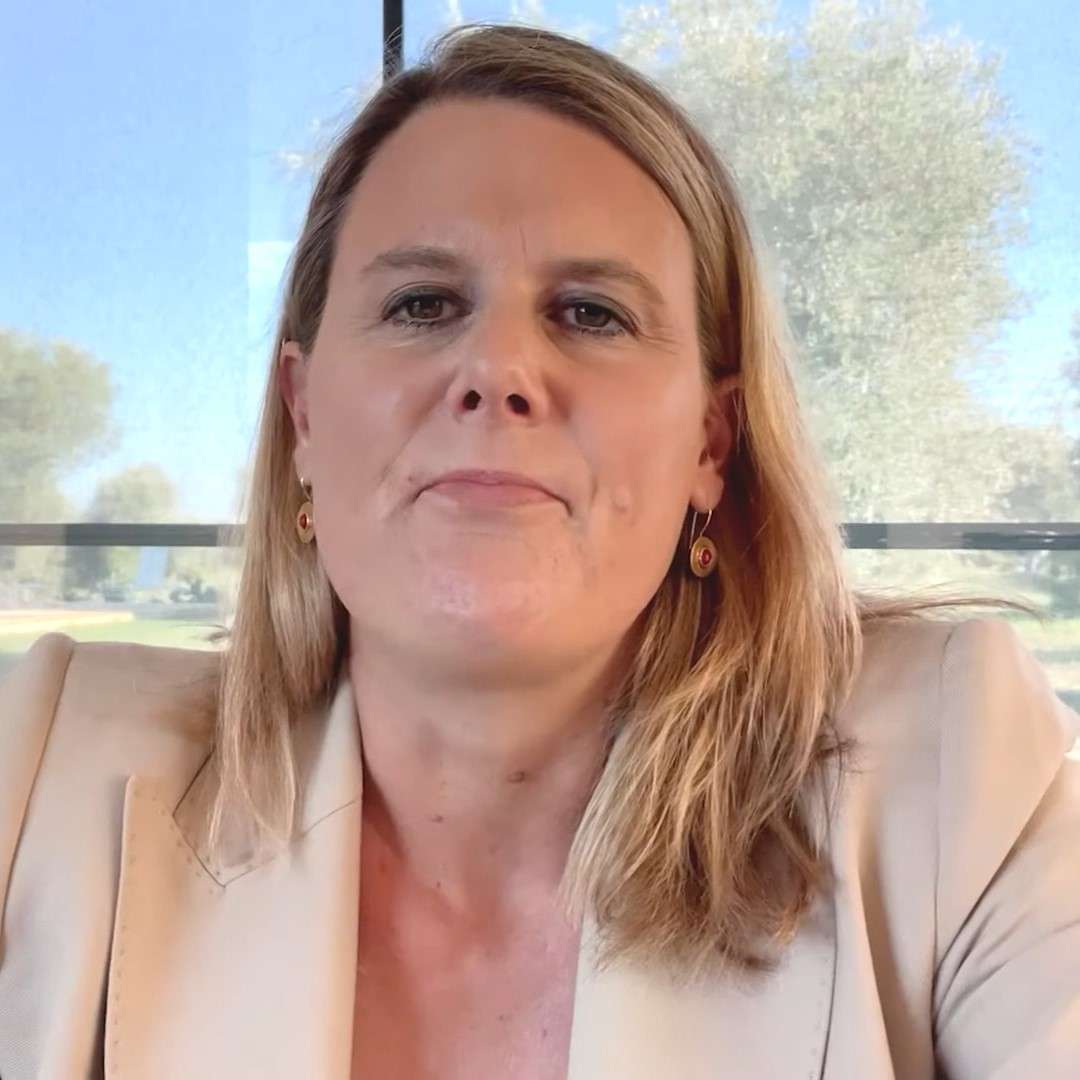

United Nations Special Rapporteur on Torture and Other Cruel, Inhuman or Degrading Treatment or Punishment
- Incumbent
- Assumed office August 2022
- Secretary-General: António Guterres
- Preceded by: Nils Melzer

Personal details
- Born: Australia
- Education: University of Tasmania; University of Nottingham; International Institute of Human Rights; Australian National University
- Occupation: Lawyer, scholar

Alice Jill Edwards (born 1972) is an Australian lawyer and scholar. She was the United Nations Special Rapporteur on Torture and Other Cruel, Inhuman or Degrading Treatment or Punishment 2022 to 2026.

== Early life ==
Edwards was born in Australia and took a bachelor's degree at the University of Tasmania. She holds a Master of Laws from the University of Nottingham and a Diploma in International and Comparative Law from the International Institute of Human Rights in France. She returned to Australia to take a PhD in Public International Law at Australian National University. She previously worked for Amnesty International and a Mozambique-based NGO.

== Career ==
Edwards began working at the Office of the United Nations High Commissioner for Refugees (UNHCR) in 1998 in Bosnia and Herzegovina, followed by field assignments in Rwanda (twice) and Morocco, rising to become Chief of Section – Protection Policy and Legal Advice, the key institutional legal position, from 2010 until 2015. Then from 2016 until 2021, she led the secretariat of the inter-governmental diplomatic Convention against Torture Initiative (CTI). She also sits on the editorial board of the journals Torture and Migration Studies.

She has held an academic appointment in law at the University of Oxford.

She was appointed the United Nations Special Rapporteur on Torture and Other Cruel, Inhuman or Degrading Treatment or Punishment in July 2022, taking up the position in August 2022. In a report presented to the United Nations in March 2023, Edwards stated "the national duty to investigate torture is alarmingly, universally, under-implemented". She encouraged countries to do more to investigate allegations of torture.

She investigated torture in the context of the Russo-Ukrainian War.

Prior to Julian Assange's final appeal against extradition to the United States, Edwards urged the UK to stop his extradition because of concerns he would be subject to torture if extradited. She has since welcomed his release.

She has warned the Hong Kong courts not to rely on evidence purportedly obtained via torture in mainland China, in the trial of Jimmy Lai.

She has intervened in the case of Imran Khan, former Prime Minister of Pakistan, alleging that he was being held in prolonged solitary confinement.

She tried to intervene with Russia on behalf of Alexei Navalny prior to his death in February 2024, alleging that he was being mistreated, was not receiving appropriate medical care for his serious health conditions, and that his constant solitary confinement was against international law And she has since called for a full investigation into his death.

She wrote to airlines and aviation regulators together with Gehad Madi and Siobhán Mullally in April 2024 to caution them against moving people seeking asylum to Rwanda on behalf of the British Government as they could be "compliant" in creating human rights violations. Madi, Edwards and Mullally wrote to the airlines as the UN's special rapporteurs on migrants’ human rights, torture and trafficking to identify the need for companies to comply with international human rights laws.

She has been vocal in respect of the Hamas-Israel armed conflict, calling for accountability for all international crimes. She denounced the attacks committed by Hamas and other armed groups on 7 October 2023 and called for the release of hostages. She decried alleged atrocities including mass killings and acts amounting to torture including sexual torture. She has called for a probe into allegations of mistreatment and torture by Israeli authorities against Palestinians. She was criticised by Euro-Mediterranean Human Rights Monitor for failing to raise issues about Israeli torture of, and minimising reports of Israeli sexual violence against, Palestinians.

In 2024 she was nominated for Australian of the Year.

Her term of office ended in 2026. Her successor is Pau Pérez-Sales from Spain.

== Selected works ==
- (2017) In Flight from Conflict and Violence: UNHCR Consultations on Refugee Status and Other Forms of International Protection
- (2014) Nationality and Statelessness under International Law
- (2011) Violence against Women under International Human Rights Law
