= Torture (disambiguation) =

Torture is the infliction of physical or psychological pain to punish or coerce an action from the victim.

Torture or Tortured may also refer to:

== Music ==
=== Albums ===
- Torture (album), by Cannibal Corpse, 2012
- Tortured, by Annette Ducharme, 1997

=== Songs ===
- "Torture" (song), by the Jacksons from Victory, 1984
- "Torture", written by John D. Loudermilk, notably recorded by Kris Jensen and by Petula Clark
- "Torture", by Abraham Mateo from Who I AM, 2014
- "Torture", by Cavalera Conspiracy from Blunt Force Trauma, 2011
- "Torture", by the Cure from Kiss Me, Kiss Me, Kiss Me, 1987
- "Torture", by Danny Brown from Old, 2013
- "Torture", by King from Bitter Sweet, 1985
- "Torture", by Method Man from Tical 2000: Judgement Day, 1998
- "Torture", by Miyavi from What's My Name?, 2010
- "Torture", by the Psychedelic Furs from Midnight to Midnight, 1987
- "Tortured", by Loverboy from Six, 1997
- "Tortured", by OTEP from Sevas Tra, 2002
- "Tortured", by the Replacements from All Shook Down, 1990

== Other uses ==
- Torture (journal), a medical journal covering rehabilitation of torture victims and prevention of torture
- Tortured (film), a 2008 film starring Laurence Fishburne

== See also ==
- Animal abuse
- BDSM
- Sadomasochism
- Torture murder
