= Cruel, inhuman or degrading treatment =

Human rights concept

Cruel, inhuman (inhumane) or degrading treatment (CIDT) is treatment of persons which is contrary to human rights or dignity, but is not classified as torture. It is forbidden by the Universal Declaration of Human Rights, Article 3 of the European Convention on Human Rights, the United Nations Convention against Torture and the International Covenant on Civil and Political Rights. Although a distinction between torture and CIDT is maintained from a legal point of view, medical and psychological studies have found that this distinction is virtually nonexistent from a psychological point of view, and that people subjected to CIDT experience the same consequences as survivors of torture. Based on this research, some practitioners have recommended abolishing the distinction.

== Inhuman treatment ==
The Equality and Human Rights Commission defines inhuman treatment as:

- serious physical assault
- psychological interrogation
- cruel detention conditions or restraints
- physical or psychological abuse in a healthcare setting
- threatening to torture someone

== Degrading treatment ==
The Equality and Human Rights Commission defines degrading treatment as undignified and humiliating treatment. Whether treatment is considered degrading is dependent on several factors, including the duration of the treatment; physical and mental effects on the victim; and the victim's age, race, sex, and vulnerabilities.

== Medical or scientific experimentation without the free consent of the subject ==
The International Covenant on Civil and Political Rights (ICCPR) in its Article 7 expressly prohibits the medical or scientific experimentation without free consent of its subject(s) and recognizes it as a particular form of torture or cruel, inhuman or degrading treatment. Moreover the Article 4.2 of the ICCPR expressly prohibits derogation from this prohibition in its Article 7, and thus is directly establishing it as peremptory norm. This makes the non-consensual medical or scientific experimentation potentially punishable under the provisions of national penal codes concerning the crimes of torture and cruel, inhuman or degrading treatment, and this in all countries which are parties of the ICCPR and the Convention against Torture and Other Cruel, Inhuman or Degrading Treatment or Punishment.

== See also ==
- Cruel and unusual punishment

== Sources ==
- ASAD, TALAL (1996). "On Torture, or Cruel, Inhuman, and Degrading Treatment". Social Research. 63 (4): 1081–1109. ISSN 0037-783X. JSTOR 40971325.
- Başoğlu, Metin; Livanou, Maria; Crnobarić, Cvetana (1 March 2007). "Torture vs Other Cruel, Inhuman, and Degrading Treatment: Is the Distinction Real or Apparent?". Archives of General Psychiatry. 64 (3): 277–85. doi:10.1001/archpsyc.64.3.277. ISSN 0003-990X. PMID 17339516.
- Waldron, Jeremy (2010). "The Coxford Lecture Inhuman and Degrading Treatment: The Words Themselves". Canadian Journal of Law & Jurisprudence. 23 (2): 269–286. doi:10.1017/S0841820900004938.
- Davis, Michael (2005). "The Moral Justifiability of Torture and other Cruel, Inhuman, or Degrading Treatment". International Journal of Applied Philosophy. 19 (2): 161–178. doi:10.5840/ijap200519215.
- Nowak, Manfred (2014). "Torture and Other Cruel, Inhuman, or Degrading Treatment or Punishment". In Clapham, Andrew; Gaeta, Paola (eds.). The Oxford Handbook of International Law in Armed Conflict. doi:10.1093/law/9780199559695.001.0001. ISBN 9780199559695.
- Bojosi, Kealeboga N. (2004). "The death row phenomenon and the prohibition against torture and cruel, inhuman or degrading treatment". African Human Rights Law Journal. 4 (2): 303–333.
- Liebling, Alison (2011). "Moral performance, inhuman and degrading treatment and prison pain". Punishment & Society. 13 (5): 530–550. doi:10.1177/1462474511422159. S2CID 147386708.
- Pérez-Sales, Pau (2016). Psychological Torture: Definition, Evaluation and Measurement. Taylor & Francis. ISBN 978-1-317-20647-7.
- Weissbrodt, David; Heilman, Cheryl (2011). "Defining Torture and Cruel, Inhuman, and Degrading Treatment". Law and Inequality: A Journal of Theory and Practice. 29: 343.
- de Frouville, O. (2011). "The Influence of the European Court of Human Rights' Case Law on International Criminal Law of Torture and Inhuman or Degrading Treatment". Journal of International Criminal Justice. 9 (3): 633–649. doi:10.1093/jicj/mqr020.
