= Institute of Therapy and Investigation =

Bolivian non-governmental organisation

The Institute of Therapy and Investigation into the Effects of Torture and State Violence (Spanish: Instituto de Terapia e Investigación sobre las Secuelas de la Tortura y la Violencia Estatal) is a multidisciplinary non-governmental organisation based in Bolivia. It offers assistance to those affected directly or indirectly by torture and state violence through rehabilitative means.

Since its founding in 2001 it has been the only organisation in Bolivia dedicated specifically to tackling the issues of torture and state violence.

== Profile ==
ITEI accompanies people affected by torture and state violence through a process of rehabilitation and extends this treatment to the families and communities of those involved. The organisation is committed to creating a collective consciousness surrounding the psychological effects of torture and state violence through training and investigation.

Its stated mission is "a socio-political commitment to the creation of a just society that respects human dignity".

The work of ITEI focuses on the following individuals, families and communities:

- those affected by state torture and/or violence
- political refugees
- those who have returned from exile
- survivors of massacres
- relatives of those killed, detained or disappeared
- those affected by racism

ITEI works under the definition of torture as defined by the United Nations Convention Against Torture.

== Torture and State Violence under Bolivian Law ==
On 12 April 1999 the Bolivian government signed the United Nations Convention Against Torture which recommended that "the Bolivian state incorporates into its penal legislation the definition of torture as it appears in the Convention, which considers it an offence and imposes sanctions proportionate to the severity of the crime".

In December 2005 the Bolivian government signed and ratified the Optional Protocol to the Convention against Torture, agreeing to establish a system of regular and unrestricted visits in places of detention with the aim of preventing torture and other cruel and inhumane acts. However, this has yet to become a reality and violence and torture has continued in Bolivia's prisons, as seen by the death in September 2007 of Justino Porco in Cantumarca Prison in Potosí, to cite one example.

Article 15 (I) and Article 114 (I) of the Constitution of Bolivia recognise the right to life and physical integrity, stating that no one will suffer torture or cruel, inhumane, degrading or humiliating treatment, thus guaranteeing full protection to all those within the Bolivian state. Article 295 of the current Bolivian Penal Code sanctions those responsible for acts of torture with a maximum prison sentence of 10 years for acts that result in the death of a tortured person.

The United Nations High Commissioner for Human Rights noted significant developments in the defence of human rights in Bolivia as upheld in the new Constitution of 7 February 2009, especially in the recognition of the rights of Bolivia's indigenous population, which has been disproportionately affected by acts of state violence. However, the same report stressed that the laws against torture and state violence in Bolivia remain unsatisfactory, particularly regarding the follow-up to events in Sucre and Pando in 2008, despite increased awareness and sensitivity to these issues.

The National Plan of Action on Human Rights 2009-2014 "To Live Well" recognised the absence of any preventative or punitative legislation against torture and mistreatment, and established the objective of adopting a policy of prevention, vigilance and sanction of torture and cruel, inhumane, degrading or humiliating punishment and treatment, or any other form of attack on physical, psychological, moral or sexual integrity perpetrated by private persons or public functionaries. It also recommended that the government implement a national preventive mechanism to allow unrestricted access to places of detention.

Various human rights organisations have raised concerns over the extent to which legislation against torture has actually been implemented. Amnesty International, for example, is concerned that the extradition requests filed with the US government regarding former Bolivian President Gonzalo Sánchez de Lozada and two former ministers, all implicated in the killings of demonstrators in El Alto in 2003, are still pending. Although legal proceedings were taken against the state officials held responsible for events in Pando 2008, both the UN and Amnesty International have expressed concerns about delays and complications in the judicial process, which has yet to be concluded.

== Work ==
ITEI carries out projects in various areas, engaging not only in the investigation of acts of torture and state violence and the rehabilitation of those affected, but also in the prevention of such incidents.

=== Sociotherapy ===
The intervention branch of ITEI is divided into the following:

- Medical division, responsible for rehabilitation and prevention
- Psychotherapeutic division which provides psychological treatment
- Social and legal division which assists reintegration into society

Care is offered to anyone affected by torture and state violence. Between 2005 and 2008 some 678 patients were attended to in ITEI's medical centres in La Paz, El Alto and Cochabamba, many of whom were involved in major acts of state violence or repression. In response to the Cochabamba social unrest of 2007, for example, ITEI offered psychological and social care to the 51 men, women and children directly affected by the incident. ITEI continues to provide medical, psychological and judicial assistance to those involved in the events of 24 May 2008 in Sucre when some 60 government supporters were subject to violence and humiliation in the city's main square at the hands of supporters of Bolivia's opposition movement.

=== Investigation ===
The investigative department works with those who have been subject to torture or other forms of state violence, or have been forced to "disappear" or go into exile. The department carries out surveys and interviews, records witness testimonies, launches investigations, publishes articles, provides legal consultation and hosts workshops, seminars and debates. After the events in Sucre in May 2008, for instance, ITEI initiated an emergency project to document what had occurred and produced a report on "The Return of Repression: Colonial Racism in Charcas", as well as launching a campaign in Europe to raise awareness of what had taken place. ITEI also demanded an investigation into the incident before the Inter-American Court of Human Rights.

=== Training ===
The training department has two principal aims:

1. To organise workshops in human rights and educate those groups which tend to be discriminated against or are considered at risk
2. To arrange courses in psychotraumatology for professionals who come into contact with individuals who have been exposed to violence. ITEI also runs workshops alongside other organisations, and oversees psychotherapy sessions.

Since 2006 ITEI has been working with young people as part of its "Project to Develop Young Aymaran Community Leaders" in the towns of Achacachi and Huanuni, training young leaders who have been affected by state violence and continual social upheaval. The aim of the project is that future generations will encourage coexistence in their communities and the creation of a democratic society that acknowledges and respects human rights.

=== Prison Work ===
Since March 2008 ITEI has carried out programmes of therapy and investigation with prisoners held in detention centres in the cities of La Paz and Cochabamba. ITEI offers psychological and medical assistance to women and children in prison, as well as to prison staff. The investigations aim to document acts of torture and mistreatment, and detect any violence towards children, as well as to establish:

- Where torture is taking place
- The methods of torture that are being used
- Who is committing torture and acts of violence
- Why torture is committed

By detecting and denouncing such treatment, as well as by providing instruction, ITEI hopes to prevent future acts of violence and torture in detention centres. It also hopes that its work in prisons will lead to reforms in the prison system that seek to improve conditions for prisoners and respect their human rights.

=== Draft Bill ===
In 2007 the Ministry of Foreign Affairs in Bolivia asked ITEI to create a draft bill against torture and for the implementation of a National Preventive Mechanism. Delivered to the president of the Committee of Human Rights in July 2010, ITEI's "Draft Bill against Torture and Cruel, Inhumane, Degrading or Humiliating Treatment" proposes a prison sentence of 12 to 20 years for those convicted of torture as well as "just and adequate compensation" for those affected, including full rehabilitation. ITEI, in its explanation of the motives behind the presentation of the draft bill, insists that the current sentences in the Bolivian Penal Code for those found guilty of torture are not in proportion to the offence. According to ITEI, torture has long-lasting physical and psychological effects and therefore the prison sentence should be no shorter than that imposed for murder.

The draft bill also proposes the implementation of a National Preventive Mechanism - which the Bolivian government is obliged to introduce under the Optional Protocol to the Convention against Torture - to establish a system of regular and unrestricted visits in all places of detention with the aim of putting a stop to torture and inhumane treatment. The document mentions various locations where intervention is needed to prevent human rights violations, including police cells, prisons, juvenile detention centres and other police and military establishments.

The proposed bill represents a foundation document for the discussion of legislation against torture and other humane treatment in Bolivia.

== Partner organisations ==
ITEI is a member of the International Rehabilitation Council for Torture Victims (IRCT)
