= Letters rogatory =

Formal request by a court to a foreign court for judicial assistance

Letters rogatory or letters of request are a formal request from a court to a foreign court for some type of judicial assistance. The most common remedies sought by letters rogatory are service of process and taking of evidence.

== Taking of evidence ==
One reason why a court may require assistance from a foreign court is to obtain evidence from a witness. This evidence may be to answer questions relevant to the determination of an issue of fact, or for disclosure of documents.

Courts usually have the power to subpoena witnesses only from within the jurisdiction of their own legislature unless they are aided by foreign judicial, or sometimes legislative, authority. For example, Alice in the United States, could not summon Jean from France to the US courthouse. Instead, the US court would issue a letter rogatory to a French court, which would then examine Jean in France, and send a deposition back to the requesting court.

Insofar as requests to US courts are concerned, the use of letters rogatory for requesting the taking of evidence has been replaced in large part by applications under 28 USC 1782, or Section 1782 Discovery.

In many cases, the witness is willing to provide the testimony. However, the target court may compel the testimony of a witness who is unwilling to appear.

== Conventions ==
In the past, letters rogatory could not usually be transmitted directly between the applicable courts, and they had to be transmitted via consular or diplomatic channels, which could make the whole process very slow. There have been various international conventions in regard to service of process and taking of evidence.

One of the earliest conventions to simplify the procedure of letters rogatory was the 1905 Civil Procedure Convention, signed at The Hague. Drafted only in French, it was ratified by only 22 countries. Later conventions, created after the institution of the Hague Conference on Private International Law, which was drafted in both English and French, commanded more support.

The Hague Service Convention, ratified in 1965, enabled designated authorities in each of the signatory states to transmit documents for service to each other, bypassing the diplomatic route. This convention has been ratified by 60 states, including the United Kingdom and the United States, neither of which had ratified the 1905 convention. The Hague Evidence Convention, ratified in 1970, formalised procedures for taking of evidence. It has been ratified by 43 states. For situations exclusively among member states of the European Union, two regulations (1348/2000 and 1206/2001) superseded the two Hague Conventions. The two regulations apply to each of the member states of the European Union with the exception of Denmark, which has opted out.

== See also ==
- Amicus Curiae
