= Maria Grazia Giammarinaro =

Italian judge and policy-maker (born 1953)

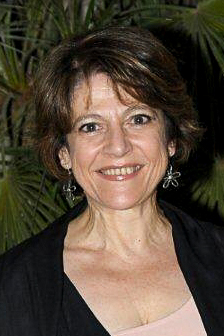
- Born: June 23, 1953 (age 73); Palermo, Sicily, Italy

Maria Grazia Giammarinaro (born 23 June 1953) is an Italian judge and policy-maker.

== Education ==
Giammarinaro graduated in 1975 with a doctorate in Italian Literature and Sociology from the University of Palermo, after which time she worked for several years as a high school teacher before studying law. Giammarinaro graduated with a doctorate in law from the Department of Civil Law, University of Palermo in 1986.

== Career history ==
=== Early judicial work ===
Giammarinaro first rose to prominence in Rome in 1991 where she was appointed as a Judge of the Criminal Court. In this position, she dealt with, among others, cases of manslaughter resulting from medical malpractice and violations of safety regulations in exploitative working situations, as well as with cases of domestic violence and exploitation of prostitution. As a practitioner dealing with gender-based violence, she actively participated in the national debate on the new law on sexual violence (Law No 66 of 15 February 1996 Norme contro la violenza sessuale).

=== Time in Italian government ===
In 1996, Giammarinaro was called to work for the Minister for Equal Opportunities as Head of the Legislative Office and Adviser to the Minister for Equal Opportunities. In this position, Giammarinaro provided complex substantive and legal advice to the Minister on a host of issues such as anti-discrimination legislation, living-together agreements, regulations related to the transmission of the family name, domestic and sexual violence against women, the sexual abuse of children, alternative sanctions for women and children in detention, women's access to voluntary military service, migration regulation especially regarding family reunification and civil action against discrimination. She was also tasked with providing advice on the smuggling of migrants and trafficking in human beings, and personally oversaw the development of Italian legislation against human trafficking. Her leadership in this area was recognized early on by the Italian Government when she was appointed as Co-ordinator of the Italian Inter-ministerial Committee of Government Action against Trafficking in Women and Children, co-chaired by the Minister for Equal Opportunities and the Minister for Social Solidarity from 1997–2001. In this co-ordinating function, Giammarinaro worked with the National Antimafia Directorate, the Headquarters of the Police, the Carabinieri and Guardia di Finanza, with government agencies and departments, to strengthen the Italian Government's response to human trafficking, as well as to improve communication and partnership with civil society organizations and non-governmental organizations.

=== Multi-lateral treaty negotiations ===
It was during her tenure as Adviser to the Minister that Giammarinaro was selected to represent the Italian Government in several high profile international and multi-lateral negotiations especially concerning transnational organized crime. In 1999–2000, Giammarinaro was a member of the Italian delegation to the Ad Hoc Committee on the Elaboration of a United Nations Convention against Transnational Organized Crime and the Protocol to Prevent, Suppress and Punish Trafficking in Persons, especially Women and Children at the UN Commission for Crime Prevention and Criminal Justice in Vienna. In particular, she contributed to the development of a global agreement on the definition of trafficking in human beings, especially concerning the "abuse of a position of vulnerability" as a key concept to address difficult cases of debt bondage, extreme poverty or psychological subjugation. She was in Palermo in 2000 when the Convention and the Protocol were signed. On this occasion she participated in an informal discussion with First Lady Hillary Clinton along with a few select personalities from around the world.

She was also the Italian representative at all G-8 meetings of the Lyon Group concerning transnational organized crime, in particular the sub-group on Smuggling of Migrants and Trafficking in Persons, 1999–2000, and a member of the Italian delegation to the Committee on the elaboration of the Optional Protocol to the Convention on the Elimination of all Forms of Discrimination against Women (CEDAW), 1997–1999. She was the main drafter of the first Italian Report submitted to the CEDAW Committee in 1999. Giammarinaro was also an active member of the Italian delegation at the Rome Statute Conference in which the Statute of the International Criminal Court was approved in July 1998. At the Rome Statute negotiations, she actively contributed to the negotiations which resulted in the inclusion of human trafficking in the context of enslavement as a crime against humanity in the jurisdiction of the first ever permanent, international war crimes court in The Hague.

=== Anti-Mafia expertise ===
From 2001 to 2006, Giammarinaro served as a Pre-Trial Judge in the Preliminary Investigation Office of the Criminal Court of Rome. During this period, she developed particular expertise in human trafficking and organized crime cases, presiding over many complex large scale anti-mafia trials. She issued several important judgments dealing with a host of issues from terrorism, drug trafficking, torture, voluntary homicide and manslaughter to mafia association and trafficking in human beings. She contributed to developing and consolidating good judicial practices aimed at protecting victims' rights such as avoiding the repetition of interviews and visual contact with the defendant, while respecting the rights of the accused.

=== Council of Europe and European Commission ===
During this period, Giammarinaro was in charge of drafting a Feasibility Study for a Council of Europe Convention on Action against Trafficking in Human Beings for the Secretariat of the Council of Europe. Subsequently she took part as the Scientific Expert of the Secretariat in the whole negotiation of the Council of Europe Convention against Action against Trafficking in Human Beings, until its adoption in 2005. In the same period she was a member of the National Committee for Equal Opportunities of the National Judicial Council of Italy.

Giammarinaro served from 2006 until 2009 in the European Commission's Directorate-General for Justice, Freedom and Security of the European Commission in Brussels, where she was responsible for work to combat human trafficking and the sexual exploitation of children, as well as for penal aspects of illegal immigration within the unit dealing with the fight against organized crime. During this time she co-ordinated the Group of Experts on Trafficking in Human Beings of the European Commission.

While at the European Commission, Giammarinaro was instrumental in the development of the 2011 EU Directive on trafficking. Giammarinaro was the drafter of the first proposal for a Framework Decision on Trafficking, subsequently transformed into a Directive, and is widely regarded as one of the main actors in the negotiation leading to the adoption of Directive 2011/36 on preventing and combating trafficking in human beings, and protecting its victims. Importantly, for the first time, an EU Directive in penal matters included strengthened victim provisions regarding victims' rights in criminal proceedings, assistance and support before, during and after criminal proceedings, and special protective provisions for child victims. In 2010, Giammarinaro was selected and appointed as the third ever Special Representative and Co-ordinator for Combating Trafficking in Human Beings of the OSCE for a four-year term which ended in 2014.

== Tenure as OSCE Special Representative ==
=== Mandate ===
As OSCE Special Representative and Co-ordinator for Combating Trafficking in Human Beings, Giammarinaro was equipped with an extensive mandate to promote the fight against trafficking in human beings. Supported by her Office, she engaged in continued dialogue with the 57 OSCE participating States to raise their awareness of the crime and strengthen their responses. Moreover, she actively contributed to national and regional conferences as well as expert meetings to promote the OSCE's human rights based approach to prevention, protection, prosecution and partnership. Giammarinaro also worked in close co-operation with parliamentarians and the judiciary, building capacities and strengthening support at the national level for combating human trafficking. All these activities were carried out in close co-operation with other OSCE structures, the participating States, governmental and non-governmental organizations, as well as with international partners, especially through the Alliance against Trafficking in Persons, such as the Council of Europe, UNODC, ILO, IOM, EU and others.

=== Country visit reports ===
During her OSCE tenure, she developed the practice of country visits, by which she delivered targeted and specific recommendations to national authorities on how to improve their Government's response to human trafficking. In this capacity she made concrete improvements to the following countries which she visited: United Kingdom, Canada, Moldova, Ireland, Portugal, Azerbaijan, Bosnia and Herzegovina, Romania, Kazakhstan and Uzbekistan among others.

=== Main achievements and policy platforms ===
Giammarinaro is widely credited for having raised the political profile of the fight against trafficking, but also for having put forward a number of important and previously lesser-well known areas for advocacy and action: promoting a human rights based approach to combating human trafficking, preventing the trafficking of children, raising the visibility of trafficking for labour exploitation and specifically, domestic servitude, including in diplomatic households; broadening the partnership to include especially NGOs and other civil society actors in combating trafficking; promoting the implementation of the non-punishment of victims who were compelled to commit unlawful activities; highlighting the linkages between discrimination, social justice and human trafficking, and identifying the scope and scale of trafficking in human beings for organ removal, among other areas. In 2011, Giammarinaro was interviewed on CNN's Freedom Project – Ending Modern Slavery by Jim Clancy, drawing attention to the growing problem of trafficking for labour exploitation and child trafficking in Europe. Another important area of Giammarinaro's work has been on the non-punishment of victims, issued in the form of Recommendations of the Special Representative in 2013, which were cited as a source considered by the Lord Chief Justice of England and Wales in a landmark judgment from the highest Court in the United Kingdom which overturned the convictions of four victims of human trafficking for crimes directly linked to their situation as trafficked persons. Giammarinaro was interviewed by UK's Observer in 2013 on the occasion of the release of her Recommendations, stating that "[m]any people including children are trafficked exactly for this purpose, for example pickpocketing or drug cultivation and this is a big problem because once they commit crimes they are actually treated as criminals".

It was during the period of her mandate as OSCE SR that consensus was reached on new anti-trafficking commitments at the OSCE, including on the 2011 Vilnius Declaration on Combating All Forms of Human Trafficking and notably on the Addendum to the Action Plan on Combating Trafficking in Human Beings, 2013 a forward looking document which updated OSCE commitments to reflect new trends and challenges which emerged since the adoption of the 2003 OSCE Action Plan.

=== 2012 Hero Award ===
In 2012, she received the Hero Award from the US State Department, "in recognition of her exemplary leadership to increase engagement and strengthen commitments to fight human trafficking in the OSCE region, and to highlight the urgent issues of labour exploitation and domestic servitude in Europe". The US Government acknowledged some of the highlights of her tenure in the following way: "Dr. Giammarinaro shepherded the Ministerial Declaration on combating trafficking to adoption at the Vilnius Ministerial 2011. She has strengthened the OSCE's partnership through the Alliance against Trafficking in Persons, an informal platform of advocacy including UN agencies, international organizations, social partners, and international NGOs dealing with human rights and trafficking."

== Appointment as UN Special Rapporteur ==
On 26 June 2014, Giammarinaro was appointed by the President of the United Nations Human Rights Council as the Special Rapporteur on trafficking in persons, especially women and children, replacing Ms. Joy Ngozi Ezeilo. A report by the Consultative Group to the HRC had proposed her as the most qualified candidate.
