= Deposition (law) =

Out-of-court oral testimony of a witness, reduced to writing

A deposition in the law of the United States, or examination for discovery in the law of Canada, is the taking of sworn, out-of-court oral testimony of a witness that may be reduced to a written transcript for later use in court or for discovery purposes. Depositions are commonly used in litigation in the United States and Canada. They are almost always conducted outside court by the lawyers themselves, with no judge present to supervise the examination.

== History ==
Depositions by written interrogatories first appeared around the mid-15th century as a procedure for discovery, factfinding, and evidence preservation in suits in equity in English courts. They differed radically from modern depositions in three ways: the party seeking a witness's testimony merely propounded written interrogatories which were read out loud by a master or court-appointed commissioner to the witness in a closed proceeding without parties or counsel present; the witness's first-person oral answers under oath were not recorded verbatim, but were summarized by the master, commissioner, or a clerk appointed by them into a third-person continuous narrative; and the resulting written product (also called a "deposition") was filed with the court under seal and its contents were not revealed or "published" to the parties until shortly before trial.

The modern deposition by oral examination began to develop in New York in the early 19th century when Chancellor James Kent of the New York Court of Chancery allowed masters to actually examine witnesses (that is, pursue lines of questions in real time based on the witness's preceding answers) rather than read static interrogatories (which tended to be broadly worded and resulted in very inefficient depositions). He also allowed parties and counsel to be present during depositions. This meant depositions were no longer secret and led to counsel insisting on taking over the examinations themselves. These developments gradually spread across the United States and Canada.

During the late 19th century, summary narratives by court-appointed examiners were replaced by verbatim transcripts by court reporters. Finally, the merger of common law and equity procedure led to the adoption of live testimony in open court as the default method of taking trial evidence in all trials (equity had used depositions by written interrogatories in lieu of live testimony), which reduced the deposition to its modern role in American civil procedure as a discovery and evidence preservation device.

== By country ==
=== Canada ===
In Canada, the process is nearly identical to that followed in the United States, but the proceeding is called an examination for discovery (French: interrogatoire préalable). Typically, the questions for the witness will be a mixture of direct questions and cross-examinations on prior statements. While most of the same objections to form are applicable as in the United States, the witness's lawyer may additionally take certain questions "under advisement" as a means of delaying answering the question, without making a formal objection.

The process is considered in Canada to be time-consuming and expensive when conducted without limits. As a result, Rule 31.05.1 of the Ontario Rules of Civil Procedure has, since January 1, 2010, limited examinations for discovery to seven hours per party except with consent of the other parties or the leave of the court. British Columbia implemented similar reforms on July 1, 2010, although the new Rule 7-2(2) can be read in two ways, it appears to be that each party can examine each other party for a maximum of seven hours unless the court orders otherwise. The alternative reading is that each party is only to be examined for a maximum of seven hours.

=== China ===
In mainland China, it is generally illegal to take depositions for use in foreign courts.

=== United States ===
Deposition is the preferred term in U.S. federal courts and in the majority of U.S. states. In some unusual situations, depositions can be taken during or even after trial.

==== Civil procedure ====
In almost all cases pending in United States federal courts, depositions are carried out under Rule 30 of the Federal Rules of Civil Procedure. About 35 states use versions of the FRCP in their state courts. Other states have discovery rules that are set out either in court rules or statutes, and which vary somewhat from one state to another. According to FRCP Rule 30, the number of depositions is limited to ten depositions per side (i.e. plaintiffs and defendants), with deposition of each deponent limited to a single day of no more than seven hours (unless specified otherwise in local rules of the district).

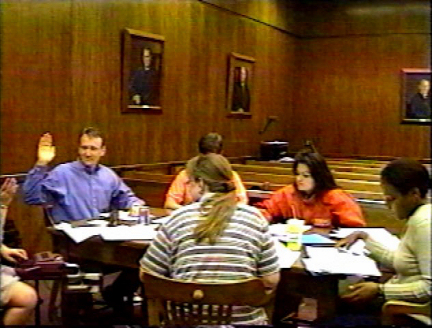
Expert witness deposition in a mock trial simulation. The court reporter, who is an officer of the court, administers the oath to the deponent.

The person to be deposed (questioned) at a deposition, known as the deponent, is usually notified to appear at the appropriate time and place by means of a subpoena. Frequently, the most desired witness (the deponent) is an opposite party to the action. In that instance, legal notice may be given to that person's attorney, and a subpoena is not required. However, if the witness is not a party to the lawsuit (a third party) or is reluctant to testify, then a subpoena must be served on that party. To ensure an accurate record of statements made during a deposition, a court reporter is present and typically transcribes the deposition by digital recording or stenographic means. Depending upon the amount in controversy and the ability of the witness to appear at trial, audio or video recordings of the deposition are sometimes taken as well.

===== Conduct of depositions =====
Depositions usually take place at the office of the court reporter or in the office of one of the law firms involved in a case. However, depositions are also sometimes taken at a witness's workplace or home, or in a nearby hotel's conference room. Generally, the deposition is attended by the person who is to be deposed, their attorney, court reporter, and other parties in the case who can appear personally or be represented by their counsels. Any party to the action and their attorneys have the right to be present and to ask questions.

Prior to taking a deposition, the court reporter administers the same oath or affirmation that the deponent would take if the testimony were being given in court in front of a judge and jury. Thereafter, the court reporter makes a verbatim digital or stenographic record of all that is said during the deposition, in the same manner that witness testimony is recorded in court. Some jurisdictions allow stenomask technology in lieu of traditional stenographic equipment, although many jurisdictions still prohibit stenomask because of its disconcerting effect on some lawyers and witnesses.

Attorneys for the deposing litigant are often present, although this is not required in all jurisdictions. The attorney who has ordered the deposition begins questioning of the deponent (this is referred to as "direct examination" or "direct" for short). Since nods and gestures cannot be recorded, the witness is instructed to answer all questions aloud. After the direct examination, other attorneys in attendance have an opportunity to cross-examine the witness. The first attorney may ask more questions at the end, in re-direct, which may be followed by re-cross.

During the course of the deposition, one attorney or another may object to questions asked. In most jurisdictions, only two types of objections are allowed: The first is to assert a privilege and the second is to object to the form of the question asked. Objections to form are frequently used to signal the witness to be careful in answering the question. Since the judge is not present, all other objections, in particular those involving the rules of evidence, are generally preserved until trial. They still can be made sometime at the deposition to indicate the serious problem to judge and witness, but the witness must answer the question despite these objections. If the form objection is made, the opposite party still has the right to re-phrase the same question and ask it again. Indeed, in Texas, lawyers were so aggressively using objections to indirectly coach their witnesses on the record that all objections outside four narrow categories are now prohibited and making such prohibited objections waives all objections to the question or answer at issue. California is the major "outlier" on deposition objections; under the California Civil Discovery Act as enacted in 1957 and heavily revised in 1986, most objections must be given on the record at the deposition (and must be specific as to the objectionable nature of the question or response) or they are permanently waived.

As with oral examination at trial, depositions can become heated at times, with some attorneys asking harassing questions to provoke witnesses into losing their tempers, some witnesses giving evasive answers, and occasional use of profane language. In extreme situations, one side or the other may ask the reporter to mark the record, then may suspend the deposition, demand a rush transcript, and file an emergency motion to compel a response, for a protective order, or for sanctions. Some courts have magistrates or discovery commissioners who are on call for such contingencies, and the parties are supposed to use them to referee such disputes over the telephone or via email before resorting to filing motions. In extreme circumstances where the relationship between the lawyers, parties, or witnesses has totally broken down, the court may require the use of a discovery referee who will have authority to sit in on depositions and rule immediately on objections as they are presented, may order that all further depositions take place in court in the presence of a judge, or may grant terminating sanctions if the record is already clear as to which party or attorney is responsible for the breakdown in civility.

Parties can bring documents to the deposition and ask document identification questions to build a foundation for making the documents admissible as evidence at trial, as long as the deponent admits their authenticity. The court reporter and all parties in the case are usually provided a copy of the documents during the deposition for review.

In recent years, developments in litigation technology has allowed the use of paper documents to be replaced by electronic documents and exhibits in the deposition. In such cases, the examining attorney marks and distributes the official exhibits electronically using a laptop or tablet device. The deponent, court reporter, and all parties receive digital official exhibits or courtesy copies. Combined with live transcript feed technology and legal videography, digital exhibit technology has made participation in remote depositions more functional and popular.

Under FRCP 30(d)(1) and its state counterparts, a deposition normally must take place for no longer than seven hours on one day per each deponent, unless otherwise stipulated by the parties or ordered by the court. The deposing party who knows that a deposition will require more than seven hours on one day must either ask the deponent to stipulate to more time, or, if the deponent is uncooperative, promptly file a motion for a longer deposition. For many years, California was the major exception to this rule, in that its Civil Discovery Act had no default time limit; depositions could theoretically proceed indefinitely, or at least until the deposition became so obviously excessive and burdensome that the deponent was able to move for a protective order. However, in January 2013, the California legislature amended the Civil Discovery Act to fall in line with the federal rule, by requiring that depositions will typically be limited to seven hours of total testimony. This new rule does not apply to "any case brought by an employee or applicant for employment against an employer for acts or omissions arising out of or relating to the employment relationship."

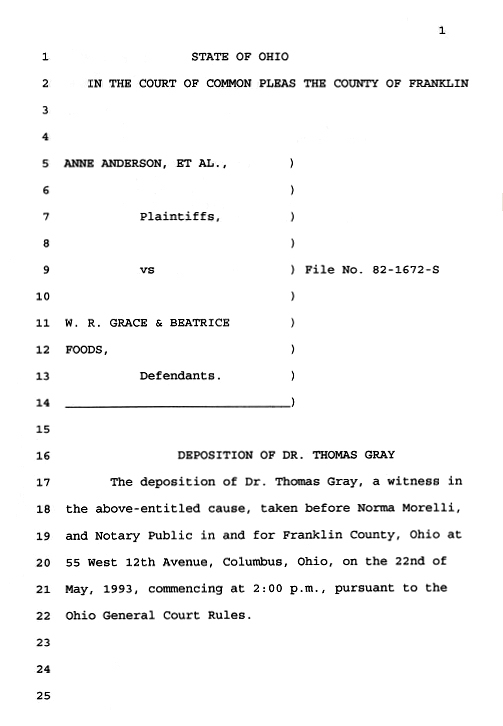
Example page from stenographers copy of an expert's deposition from Anderson v. Cryovac

After the deposition, the transcript is then published in the form of a hardcopy booklet, which is provided to the deponent as well as to any party to the suit who wishes to purchase a copy. The booklet will have the case caption (the name of the court, case number, and names of the parties) on the front. Inside, the pages have line numbers along the left margin, so that the parties can precisely cite testimony by page and line in later court documents. Timestamps are inserted into the margin if a video recording is being made; in the event the witness is unavailable for trial, the parties or the court will use the timestamps to identify admissible segments which a video editor will stitch together to present to the jury. A concordance is automatically generated by the stenographic system's software and included in the back of the booklet. Finally, the booklet includes the court reporter's certificate in which they formally certify the truth and accuracy of the transcript. (In some states, the court reporter is also a notary public.) Most court reporters can also provide a digital copy of the transcript in ASCII, RealLegal, and PDF formats.

The court reporter also keeps a copy of the documents provided to the deponent during the deposition for document identification questions, unless digital document and exhibit technology is employed, in which case the deponent and all parties receive the official exhibits in real time. The deponent normally has the right to read and sign the deposition transcript before it is filed with the court. The deponent cannot change his testimony as recorded by the court reporter in the deposition transcript, but under rule 30(e) the deponent can correct on an additional "errata sheet" any mistakes in the deposition transcript shortly after the transcript has been typed and bound.

The errata sheet allows the deponent to make any modifications that make "changes in form or substance," giving the deponent the option to alter their record from the original transcript. Issues may arise where a party attempts to make substantive changes to testimony through errata sheets.

===== Use of depositions =====
The chief values of obtaining a deposition, as with any discovery proceeding, is to give all litigant parties in a contested case a fair preview of the evidence, and to provide support documents for further trials and dispositive motions. The process provides a "level playing field" of information among the litigants and avoids surprises at trial (traditionally regarded as an unfair tactic). Another benefit of taking depositions is to preserve a witness's recollection while it is still fresh, since the trial may still be months or years away. When a witness's testimony in open court is inconsistent with that given at deposition, a party can introduce the deposition to impeach (or contradict) the witness. In the event a witness is unavailable for trial (usually because they are deceased, seriously ill, or live hundreds of miles away), their deposition may be read or played before the jury and made part of the record in the case, with the same legal force as live testimony. In some states, stenographic, audio, or video records of depositions can be offered into evidence even if the witness is available. Deposition of the opposite party is often used to produce self-incriminating statements from the deponent, also document identification questions can make exhibits admissible for hearings and summary judgment motions.

Sometimes, after a number of witnesses have been deposed, the parties will have enough information that they can reasonably predict the outcome of a prospective trial, and may decide to arrive at a compromise settlement, thus avoiding trial and preventing additional costs of litigation. Accordingly, while most depositions are not videotaped, opposing counsel may use the opportunity to get an impression of the witness's affect and appearance, because these are telling factors as to how that person will present in front of a jury. Furthermore, deposition transcripts are frequently submitted in support of motions for summary judgment as evidence that there is no triable issue of fact. The moving party may use transcripts to argue that even if all the testimony given at deposition was given again at trial, no reasonable factfinder could find in the opponent's favor on a material issue of fact. The rationale is that generally, a witness must give consistent testimony on all material issues of fact both at deposition and at trial (unless there is a very good reason for changing one's answers), or else the inconsistencies can and will be used to impeach his credibility.

==== Criminal procedure ====
In some United States jurisdictions, depositions may be taken in criminal cases, for reasons that vary between jurisdictions. In federal criminal cases, Federal Rules of Criminal Procedure Rule 15 governs the taking of depositions. Each state has its own laws which govern the taking of depositions.

Most jurisdictions provide that depositions may be taken to perpetuate the testimony of a witness, that is, preserve their testimony for trial. If the person requested to testify (deponent) is a party to the lawsuit or someone who works for an involved party, notice of time and place of the examination before trial can be given to the other side's attorney, but if the witness is an independent third party, a subpoena must be served on this witness if they are recalcitrant. This occurs when a witness may not be able to testify at trial. The deposition of the witness is taken and, if the witness is unable to appear at trial, the deposition may be used to establish the witness' testimony in lieu of the witness actually testifying. Regarding depositions to preserve testimony, the Confrontation Clause of the Sixth Amendment to the United States Constitution establishes a constitutional right of the defendant to be present during the deposition and to cross-examine the witness. The defendant may waive this right.

Some jurisdictions provide that depositions may be taken for purposes of discovery. In these jurisdictions, the defendant does not have a constitutional right to be present, although such a right may be established by statute.

Some jurisdictions require that because of the sensitive nature of taking a deposition of a minor, it must be videotaped.

A defendant in a criminal case may not be deposed without their consent because of the Fifth Amendment right to not give testimony against oneself.

== See also ==
- subpoena duces tecum
- subpoena ad testificandum
- Section 1782 Discovery
- Request for admission
