= Siobhán Mullally =

Irish jurist and UN special rapporteur

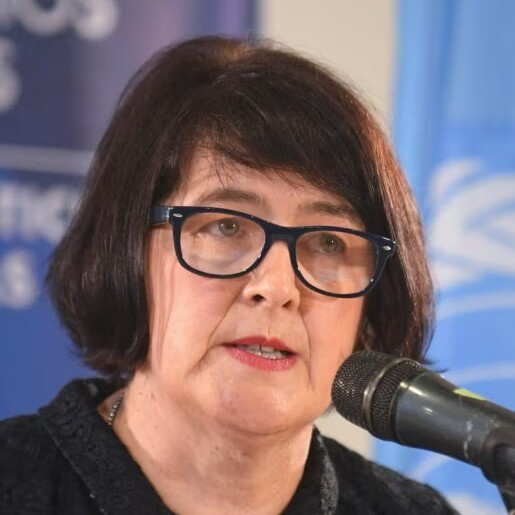
- Born: 1968 (age 57–58); London
- Education: European University Institute in Florence
- Occupation: Professor of Human Rights Law
- Employer(s): University College Cork, University of Galway
- Known for: Professor and United Nations special rapporteur on people trafficking

Siobhán Mullally (born 1968) is an Irish professor of law and the UN special rapporteur on human trafficking. In 2025 she was the Established Professor of Human Rights Law at the University of Galway where she is also the Director of the Irish Centre for Human Rights. She was appointed UN Special Rapporteur on trafficking in persons, especially women and children, for the UN Human Rights Council in 2020

== Life ==
Mullally was born in London in 1968. She graduated in law in 1988 at University College Cork and two years later she became a Master of Laws at the London School of Economics and Political Science. She was a visiting professor at the National Law School of India University in Bangalore in 1994, and at Peshawar University from 1992 to 1994. She became a Doctor of Laws in 2003 at the European University Institute in Florence.

In her 2006 publication, Gender, Culture and Human Rights: Reclaiming Universalism, she argued that feminism needed to "take hold" of human rights and "restructure them". Mullally was a founding member of the leadership team of the migrant rights organisation NASC and is a member of the Irish Council for Civil Liberties. She chaired the Irish Refugee Council from 2006 to 2008. In 2009, she looked at the independence of Pakistan's judiciary as part of an International Bar Association inquiry team.

From 2012 to 2018 she was a member of the European Advisory Board of the Group of Experts on Action against Trafficking in Human Beings (GRETA). She was the group's president from 2016 to 2018 and she co-authored reports on Austria, the UK, Italy, Hungary, Turkey and Sweden. From 2014 to 2019 she was a member of the Irish Human Rights and Equality Commission, a member of the Treaty Organisation for the Good Friday Agreement and a member of the Joint Committee on Human Rights of the Northern Irish and Irish Human Rights Commissions. She was appointed UN Special Rapporteur on trafficking in persons, especially women and children, for the UN Human Rights Council in 2020.

In May 2023, she visited Colombia as part of her UN brief to look at human trafficking. The country has millions of refugees and there were areas where armed independent groups were in charge. In 2024 it was announced that she was to be the founding head of the Platform of Independent Experts on Refugee Rights (PIERR) which is funded by OHCHR and UNHCR. She wrote to airlines and aviation regulators together with Gehad Madi and Alice Jill Edwards in April 2024 to caution them against moving people to Rwanda on behalf of the British Government as they could be "compliant" in creating human rights violations. Madi, Edwards and Mullally wrote to the airlines (they were the UN's special rapporteurs on migrants, torture and trafficking) to remind them of the need to comply with international human rights laws.

In 2024 she spent eleven days in Guinea-Bissau where she warned of the hazards facing girls who are brought in from the country to take employment in domestic service. She said that due to conditions including poor education and poverty these girls with at risk of being exploited sexually. She highlighted street children and the risks due to tourism particularly in the Bijagós Islands. She noted that the government was making moves but these were not adequate.

Mullaly was Professor of Law at University College Cork and Director of the Centre for Criminal Justice and Human Rights in Cork. As of 2024, she was the Professor at the University of Galway and Director of the Irish Centre for Human Rights .

== Publications ==
She has been an editor of several Irish Yearbooks of International Law with Fiona de Londras.

- Gender, Culture and Human Rights: Reclaiming Universalism, 2006
- "Civic Integration, Migrant Women and the Veil: At the Limits of Rights?" in Modern Law Review, 2011
- "Fleeing Homophobia: Sexual Orientation, Gender Identity and Asylum" in International Journal of Refugee Law, 2015
- Care, Migration and Human Rights: Law and Practice, 2015
- "Regulation Abortion: Dissensus and the Politics of Rights" in Social & Legal Studies, 2016
- "A Crisis of Protection in Europe: Migrants at Sea" in Proceedings Of The 98th Annual Meeting, American Society of International Law, 2016
- International Disability Law and the Experience of Marginality, 2019
