= Inge Genefke =

Danish human rights activist (born 1938)

Inge Genefke (born 1938) is a Danish campaigner and worker on behalf of torture victims. She received the Right Livelihood Award in 1988 "for helping those whose lives have been shattered by torture to regain their health and personality."

== Work ==
Born in Denmark, Genefke has devoted her career specifically to the treatment and rehabilitation of victims of torture. She began her career in this field in 1973 after Amnesty International issued a plea to physicians throughout the world to assist those who had been tortured.

She started as co-founder of the Danish Medical Group of Amnesty International in 1974. In 1982 she founded the Rehabilitation and Research Centre for Torture Victims (RCT) in Copenhagen, Denmark. The International Rehabilitation Council for Torture Victims was founded in 1985, initially as the international arm of the RCT. As the demands continued to grow, the IRCT was established as an international and independent organisation in 1997, with Genefke serving as the IRCT Ambassador.

== See also ==
- The Secret Life of Words (2005 film)
