= United Nations Special Rapporteur on Torture and Other Cruel, Inhuman or Degrading Treatment or Punishment =

- Emblem of the United Nations
- Incumbent; Pau Pérez-Sales since August 2026
- Inaugural holder: Pieter Kooijmans
- Website: Official website

The United Nations Special Rapporteur on Torture and Other Cruel, Inhuman or Degrading Treatment or Punishment is a United Nations special rapporteur. The office has been filled by Pau Pérez-Sales since 1 August 2026.

== History ==
United Nations Special Rapporteur on Torture and Other Cruel, Inhuman or Degrading Treatment or Punishment
Name	Image	Time frame	Reference
Peter Kooijmans	Head and shoulders photo of man	1985–1993	
Nigel Rodley	Head and shoulders photo of man	1993–2001	
Theo van Boven	Head and shoulders photo of man	2001–2004	
Manfred Nowak	Head and shoulders photo of man	2004–2010	
Juan E. Méndez	Head and shoulders photo of man	2010–2016	
Nils Melzer		2016–2022	
Alice Jill Edwards		2022–2026	
Pau Pérez-Sales		2026–	
