= Special Rapporteur on trafficking in persons, especially women and children =

United Nations mandate to address human trafficking

- Incumbent; Siobhán Mullally since 2020
- Reports to: UN High Commissioner for Human Rights
- Formation: 2004; 22 years ago
- Website: Special Procedures of the Human Rights Council

The post of Special Rapporteur on trafficking in persons, especially women and children, was created by the United Nations Human Rights Council in 2004 to gather information on trafficking in persons, especially women and children, and to develop strategies for combating it.

== Human trafficking ==
Human trafficking has been on the agenda of the United Nations from the very beginning; the Convention for the Suppression of the Traffic in Persons and of the Exploitation of the Prostitution of Others was adopted in 1949.

According to estimates by the International Labour Organization (ILO) from 2014, human trafficking generates approximately US$150 billion in profit annually.

The United Nations Office on Drugs and Crime (UNODC) has been compiling official statistics on trafficking victims since 2003, based on data provided by member states. In 2016, the UNODC documented over 25,000 trafficking victims in 97 countries, although a significant number of unreported cases is likely.

An ILO publication estimated that around 50 million people were victims of modern slavery in 2021. Of these, approximately 28 million were forced into labor and approximately 22 million were sexually exploited. Since there is a close link between trafficking for the purpose of exploitation and the exploitation itself, high figures for modern slavery must also indicate a large number of victims of trafficking.

According to the UNODC study from 2016, 49% of trafficking victims are women, 23% are girls, and 7% are boys. While men are mainly trafficked for forced labor, 83% of women and 72% of girls are sexually exploited.

== The UN mandate ==
In 2004, the UN Human Rights Council established the mandate for the Special Rapporteur on Trafficking in Persons through its resolution E/CN.4/2004/110. It has been renewed annually ever since. It is the only international human rights mechanism that focuses exclusively on combating trafficking in persons. The mandate is global and it works closely with government institutions and civil society.

The Special Rapporteur's task is to gather information from all relevant actors, assess the human rights situation, and make recommendations for improvements. These recommendations are to be presented in annual reports to the Human Rights Council and the UN General Assembly.

The Special Rapporteur serves on a voluntary basis and is not subject to instructions; he is not a United Nations employee but receives a mandate from the UN, for which a code of conduct adopted by the UN Human Rights Council applies. The independent status of the mandate holder is essential for the impartial performance of their duties. The term of office is limited to a maximum of two three-year terms.

== Officeholders ==
- 2004–2008: Sigma Huda, Bangladesh
- 2008-2014: Joy Ngozi Ezeilo, Nigeria
- 2014–2020: Maria Grazia Giammarinaro, Italy
- Since 2020: Siobhán Mullally, Ireland

== Publications (selection) ==
A/HRC/53/28: Refugee protection, internal displacement and statelessness

- Report of the Special Rapporteur on trafficking in persons, especially women and children, Siobhán Mullally (Advance edited version), published on May 23, 2023

A/77/170: Report of the Special Rapporteur on trafficking in persons, especially women and children, published on July 15, 2022
A/76/263: Report on the intersections between trafficking and terrorism, published on 19 July 2021
