= Fiona de Londras =

Irish academic, UK-based since 2012

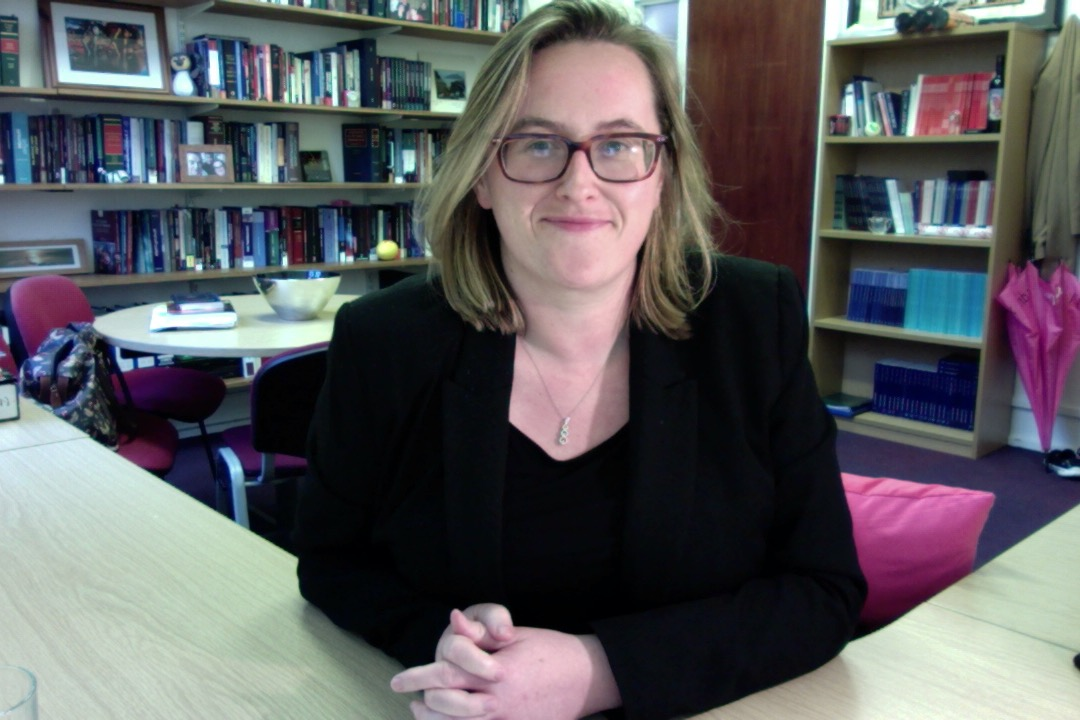
- Fiona de Londras, 2018
- Occupation: Barber Professor of Jurisprudence
- Known for: Abortion reform in Ireland, governance of counter-terrorism
- Awards: Philip Leverhulme Prize 2017

Academic background
- Education: University College Cork
- Thesis: Power, panic and the resilience of international human rights law : a study of habeas corpus in the 'war on terrorism' (2008)

Academic work
- Discipline: Law; Abortion reform; Counter-terrorism; Human rights; Constitutionalism
- Institutions: University of Birmingham Australian National University
- Website: fionadelondras.com

Fiona de Londras (born 1980) is an Irish academic and the Barber Professor of Jurisprudence at the University of Birmingham, UK. From 2019 to 2025, she was also an honorary professor at the Australian National University in Canberra.

== Life ==
=== Early life and education ===
de Londras was born in Ireland in 1980.

She studied law at University College Cork, pursuing studies to Ph.D level.

=== Academic career ===
After obtaining her Ph.D, she became a lecturer at University College Dublin's School of Law in 2008. From 2010 to 2012 she was a research fellow of the Hague Institute for the Internationalisation of Law.

In 2012 de Londras moved to the University of Durham as a Professor of Law and the Co-Director of the Durham Human Rights Centre.

She moved to the University of Birmingham in 2015 as the inaugural Chair in Global Legal Studies at Birmingham Law School. In 2024 she was announced as the Barber Professor of Jurisprudence at the University of Birmingham. She is the first woman to be appointed to this chair, recognising exceptional public lawyers, since its foundation in 1935.

She became an honorary professor at the Australian National University in 2019.

==== Visiting positions ====
de Londras has held (short-term) visiting positions at University of Peshawar (Pakistan), Emory Law School (Atlanta, GA), University of Minnesota, British Institute of International and Comparative Law (London), the Transitional Justice Institute (University of Ulster), Osgoode Hall Law School (York University, Toronto), and the University of Oxford (affiliated to Oxford Human Rights Hub, the OMS Human Rights for Future Generations Programme, and Lincoln College).

In January 2015 she was Genest Global Visitor at Osgoode Hall Law School, as part of which she delivered the Pierre Genest Memorial Lecture. In December 2017 she was the Cheng Chan Lan Yue Distinguished Visiting Fellow at the University of Hong Kong Faculty of Law.

==== Other roles ====
She was a member of the Law sub-panel for REF 2021. She has been appointed to the Law Sub Panel (UoA 18) for REF2029.

== Publications ==
de Londras has published dozens of articles and books on human rights and constitutional law in academic outlets, and also writes regularly in online and traditional media sources.

Key books and articles include:

- Fiona de Londras, The Practice and Problems of Transnational Counter-Terrorism (2022)
- Cora Chan, Fiona de Londras, "China's National Security: Endangering Hong Kong's Rule of Law?" (2020)
- Jessie Blackbourn, Fiona de Londras, Lydia Morgan, Accountability and Review in the Counter-Terrorist State (2019)
- Fiona de Londras, Kanstantsin Dzehstiarou, Great debates on the ECHR (2018)
- Fiona de Londras, Mairead Enright, Repealing the 8th: Reforming Irish Abortion Law (2018)
- Fiona de Londras, (2011) Detention in the War on Terror: Can Human Rights Fight Back?, Cambridge University Press
- Fiona de Londras & Josephine Doody (2015), The Impact, Legitimacy and Effectiveness of EU Counter-Terrorism (Routledge)
- Fergal F. Davis & Fiona de Londras (2014), Critical Debates on Counter-Terrorist Judicial Review (Cambridge; Cambridge University Press)
- Fiona de Londras & Cliona Kelly (2010) The European Convention on Human Rights Act: Operation, Impact and Analysis (Dublin, Round Hall/Thomson Reuters)

She has been an editor of several Irish Yearbooks of International Law with fellow Irish law professor Siobhán Mullally.

== Recognition ==
In 2017 de Londras won the Philip Leverhulme Prize in law, which is awarded to those within ten years of their PhD whose work has already attracted international recognition and whose future career is exceptionally promising.

== Abortion law reform ==
de Londras was a prominent advocate of abortion law reform in Ireland and played a significant role in the debates on the 36th Amendment to the Irish Constitution, which resulted in the repeal of the 8th Amendment on May 25, 2018. In 2015 de Londras was part of the group of ten feminist lawyers asked to draft ‘model legislation’ for access to abortion law for the Irish Labour Party. The group published their proposals as the General Scheme of Access to Abortion Bill 2015, which significantly influenced the proposals of the Labour Party itself. In 2018 de Londras published a book, Repealing the 8th: Reforming Irish Abortion Law (Policy Press) with Máiréad Enright in which they presented a revised model law, reflecting the recommendations of the Citizens’ Assembly. Key innovations in that draft include a proposal for trans inclusive language, the introduction of ‘buffer zones’ around clinics where abortion care is provided, and the inclusion of a provision for mandatory review of the operation of the statute three years after its enactment. The latter was included in the Health (Regulation of Termination of Pregnancy) Act 2018, and the Minister for Health Simon Harris committed to introducing buffer/exclusion zones around locations where abortion is provided.

Her work on abortion law reform in Ireland has been covered across international media including the Irish Independent, the Conversation, the Journal, Newstalk, the Oxford Human Rights Hub, BBC World News, CNN International, The Atlantic, Times (Ireland Edition), the Times, Dagsavisen, Politiken, and Hot Press.

=== Protection of Life During Pregnancy Act 2013 ===
Under the 8th Amendment, de Londras was highly critical of the treatment of suicidal women under the Protection of Life During Pregnancy Act 2013. She argued that there was no legal justification for the additional burdens that women whose lives were at risk from suicide had to face in order to access abortion when compared to women whose lives were at risk from physical illness.

=== Oireachtas Committee on the 8th Amendment 2017 ===
As well as criticising the Protection of Life During Pregnancy Act 2013, de Londras argued that the 8th Amendment was "unliveable" and unworkable, and characterised it as a "pre-emptive strike against women’s liberation". Appearing before the Oireachtas Committee on the 8th Amendment in September 2017, she argued "Constitutions should…enable the government to meet the needs of those it governs. Article 40.3.3 does not allow for a legislative structure that meets the needs of the thousands of women in Ireland who every year access abortion outside of the healthcare structures in this state". During her appearance before the Committee she was confronted by Senator Ronán Mullen who said she appeared to be incapable of using the term "unborn", and accused her of presenting advocacy rather than informed opinion. In response she said she was "agnostic" about what term was used. "Foetal life, unborn life, prenatal life, I’m happy to use any of those...I don’t have any problem with using a different word."

=== Referendum Campaign 2018 ===
During the referendum on repeal of the 8th Amendment de Londras played a prominent role in explaining the proposed changes to the law. With Máiréad Enright she founded the website www.aboutthe8th.com which provided questions and answers on the referendum "without argument". The website also had a Twitter and Facebook presence, and in partnership with Lawyers for Choice produced and distributed more than 10,000 leaflets explaining the legal implications of repeal and the Government’s proposed new legislation. The Centre for Disability Law and Policy at NUI Galway produced an easy read version of the booklet. Her role in the referendum campaign was acknowledged by Minister for Health Simon Harris, Minister for Culture Josepha Madigan, and Kate O’Connell TD in the Dáil.

== WHO Abortion Care Guidelines ==
de Londras led research on the human rights and health impact of abortion laws that was commissioned by the World Health Organization in preparation for its 2022 Abortion Care Guideline. The Guideline includes seven recommendations on abortion law and policy that emerge from the evidence base developed by de Londras and her collaborators, and which recommend the removal of unnecessary, non-evidence-based requirements like gestational limits, mandatory waiting times, and third party authorisations. Using a methodology developed by de Londras' research team, the Guideline "has a much stronger human rights focus than previous WHO guidance, integrating human rights throughout and looking at the underlying determinants of health as part of a comprehensive approach to abortion"

== Other areas of research ==
=== Judicial activism and innovation ===
de Londras is a prominent voice in the debate on the appropriate role of the judiciary within what she calls the ‘constitutionalist ecosystem’. In the context of Irish constitutional law, she argues that the meaning of constitutional provisions is rarely static or self-evident, so that the task of constitutional interpretation is shared across different branches of government (and, thus, essentially collaborative). However even within that collaborative task, she argued that superior courts have a significant role and can and should be innovative (or what some might call ‘activist’). She lodges this argument in the claim that constitutional governance must constantly address new and emerging issues, so that any system of governance that has a constitutionalist orientation is constantly faced with the task of establishing and assessing the constitutionality of new responses to old and emergent challenges. As a result, she argues that innovative constitutional interpretation is necessary so that the boundaries and limits of constitutionally permissible action can be identified in the face of new and different forms of government activity and governance. This argument was most significantly made out in “In Defence of Judicial Innovation and Constitutional Evolution” in Laura Cahillane, James Gallen & Tom Hickey, Judges, Politics and the Irish Constitution (Manchester University Press, 2016), which Judge Richard Humphreys described as “the best piece in a very good book” in his review of the collection.

Writing in the context of the European Convention on Human Rights de Londras has made a similar argument around judicial innovation and the evolution of the Convention, arguing that the Court should focus on constitutionalist evolution (over individual justice) and that in doing so the judges of the Court exercise significant self-restraint. She has written for a reorientation of the business of the Court away from dealing with large numbers of individual complaints and towards prioritising constitutionalist cases, arguing that non-execution, non-compliance, and persistent rights abuses in areas of legal clarity are a political failure that cannot be addressed by the Court per se but rather require the concerted activity of member states of the ECHR. To this end, she has argued that the infringement procedures under Article 46(4) of the Convention are unlikely to be effective. Her work on the ECHR has been cited by the Court and the PACE, and in 2018 she published Great Debates on the ECHR with Kanstantsin Dzehtsiarou, her first book on the European Convention on Human Rights.

=== Counter-terrorism ===
de Londras is well known for her work on counter-terrorism, constitutionalism, human rights, and the law.

In the context of counter-terrorism law de Londras is known for her argument that judicial oversight is both welcome and effective in attempting to limit effectively the security excesses of government and parliament. In her first major book, Detention in the ‘War on Terror’ (Cambridge University Press, 2011), she argued that in times of terrorism both government and populist urges are in favour of the introduction of measures that tend to be repressive of human rights, but that domestic courts are increasingly pushing back against these measures in order to try to ensure interferences with rights are proportionate. She subsequently defended judicial oversight of counter-terrorism as a necessary counter-weight to political excesses.

In recent years her work has turned more to the governance of counter-terrorism and focused less on the substantive provisions in counter-terrorism law. She ran a major EU-funded project called SECILE to assess the scale of EU counter-terrorism and to analyse the extent to which it might be said to be legitimate, effective and impactful. This resulted in the publication of The Impact, Legitimacy and Effectiveness of EU Counter-Terrorism (Routledge, 2015), co-edited with Josephine Doody. Building on this work de Londras has argued consistently that the processes of making and reviewing EU counter-terrorism law are inadequate and require substantial revision.

In 2017 she was awarded a grant by the Joseph Rowntree Charitable Trust to lead an 18-month project on counter-terrorism review in the UK, expanding this governance concern into the domestic realm. This project resulted in a new book, with Jessie Blackbourn (Durham) and Lydia Morgan (Birmingham), entitled Accountability and Review in the Counter-Terrorist State, published in 2019 by Bristol University Press. In 2022 she published the first comprehensive account of international counter-terrorism law and practice in The Practice and Problems of Transnational Counter-Terrorism (CUP).
