= Pau Pérez-Sales =

Spanish psychiatrist (born 1963)

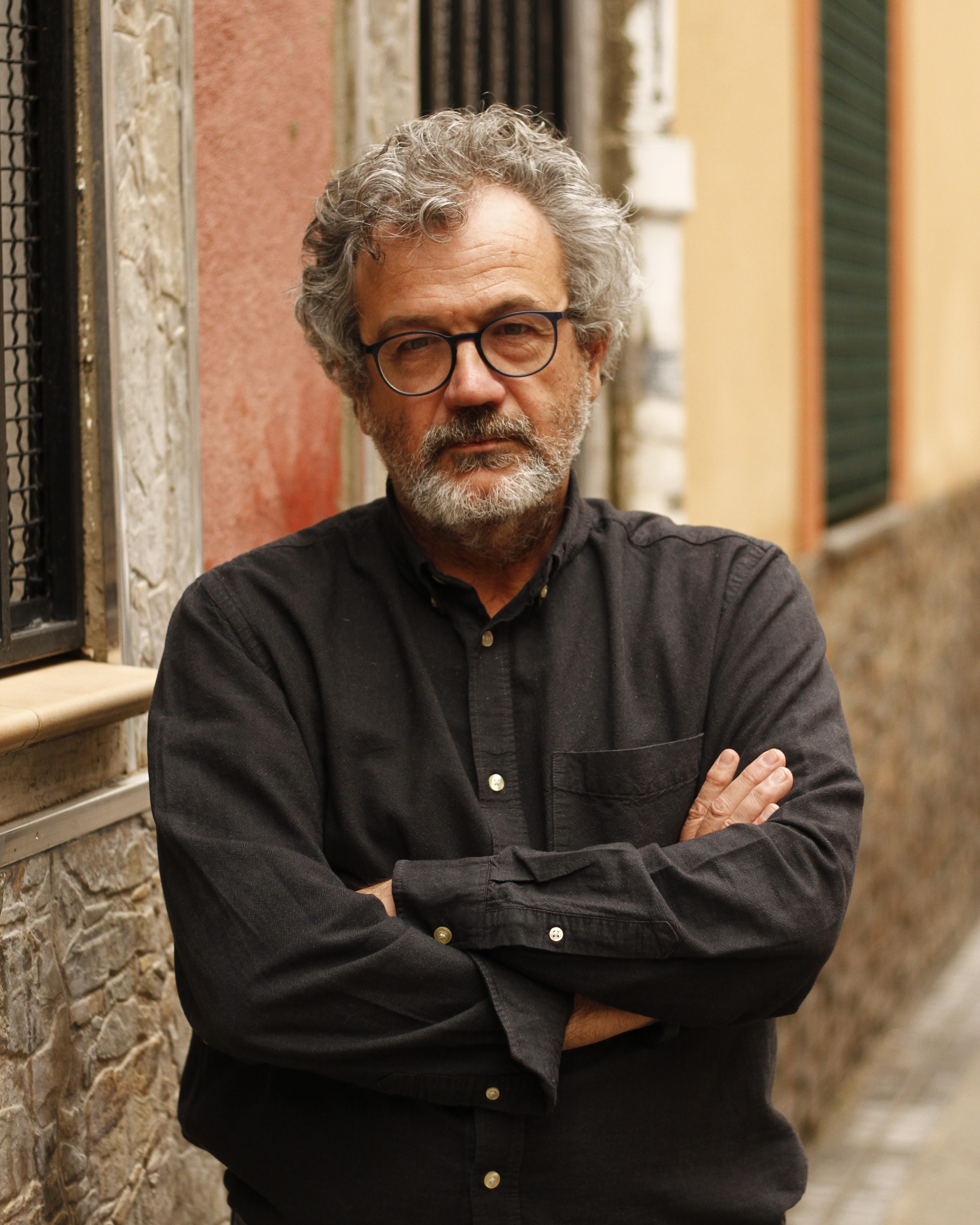
- Born: 1963 (age 62–63); Girona, Catalonia, Spain
- Education: University of Barcelona (MD), Autonomous University of Madrid (PhD in Psychiatry)
- Occupations: Forensic psychiatrist, researcher
- Employer(s): Universidad Complutense de Madrid, Hospital La Paz (Madrid)
- Title: Director, Post-Doctoral Degree in Mental Health in Political Violence and Catastrophe; Clinical Director. SiRa Centre
- Board member of: Editor-in-Chief of Torture Journal

Pau Perez-Sales is a forensic psychiatrist, psychotherapist, researcher, and the United Nations Special Rapporteur on torture and other cruel, inhuman or degrading treatment or punishment. An internationally recognized expert on torture and human rights, he founded the SIRA Centre for the research, forensic documentation, and rehabilitation of ill-treatment and torture victims in Madrid, and has served as its Clinical Director since 2014.

He was the director of the Universidad Complutense de Madrid's Post-Doctoral Degree in Mental Health in Political Violence and Catastrophe until 2024, and has been a Senior Consultant in Psychiatry at the Hospital Universitario La Paz in Madrid since 1997.

== Education ==
Pérez-Sales obtained his medical degree at the University of Barcelona in 1987. He completed his specialist training in psychiatry at the Hospital Universitario La Paz, Madrid, and received his PhD in Psychiatry from the Autonomous University of Madrid in 1994.

== Research and career ==
Pau Pérez-Sales is a former Chair of the Section on Psychological Consequences of Persecution and Torture of the World Psychiatric Association. He has conducted extensive research on the operational application of scientific research on physical and psychological torture. He coined the term "torturing environments" and developed tools to study them.

He worked as a consultant for the World Health Organization, the Inter Agency Standing Committee group on Mental Health and Psychosocial Support in Emergency Settings, MH-GAP Intervention Guide Rapid Assessment in Emergencies Program, and coordinated MHPSS programs for Doctors of the World and Médecins Sans Frontières.

His other research interests include psychotherapy in individual and community trauma, transcultural psychiatry, post-traumatic factors, and resilience. In 2012, he developed The Vital Impact Assessment Scale (Escala de Impacto Vital), also known as the VIVO Questionnaire, a tool for assessing the impact of traumatic experiences on identity and worldviews.

Since the late 1980s, Pérez-Sales has been associated with Liberation Psychology in Latin America, living and working in Nicaragua, Guatemala, Mexico, El Salvador, Chile and Colombia working with grassroot organizations, authoring books and articles related to enforced disappearances, exhumation of mass graves and policies of truth and reparation.

Pérez-Sales was a member of the international Steering Committee of the Principles on Effective Interviewing for Investigations and Information Gathering, known as the Méndez Principles, a set of standards for conducting non-coercive investigative interviews, developed between 2018 and 2021.

Since 2010, he has served as Expert Advisor to Spain's National Mechanism for the Prevention of Torture and other Cruel, Inhuman or Degrading Treatment (NPM), part of the Office of the Ombudsman (Defensor del Pueblo), participating in monitoring visits to detention facilities and producing reports on solitary confinement and ill-treatment.

Pérez-Sales is editor-in-chief of the journal Torture, a peer-review biomedical and legal journal published by the International Rehabilitation Council for Torture Victims.

In 2026 he was appointed as the United Nations Special Rapporteur on torture and other cruel, inhuman or degrading treatment or punishment.

== Selected works ==
- (2026). Torturing Environments: Psychological, Clinical and Legal Dimensions. Routledge. ISBN 9781003639350. doi:10.4324/9781003639350.
- (2022).Violencia y Trauma: del Trabajo comunitario a la psicoterapia. Guía de procesos y programas integrados. Irredento Libros.
- (2021). Repensar Experiencias. Evaluación (y diseño) de programas psicosociales. Metodologías y Técnicas. Irredento Libros. 15 November 2022.
- (2020).Cuestionario VIVO. La medida del impacto psicológico de experiencias extremas. Irredento Libros. 15 November 2022. ISBN 978-84-944889-4-8.
- (2016).Psychological torture : definition, evaluation and measurement. New York: Routledge. 2017. ISBN 978-1-315-61694-0. OCLC 954617171.
- (2007).Resistencias contra el Olvido. Trabajo psicosocial en procesos de exhumaciones. Ed GEDISA. 16 November 2007. ISBN 978-84-9784-257-0.
- (2006).Trauma, culpa y duelo : hacia una psicoterapia integradora, programa de autoformación en psicoterapia de respuestas traumáticas. Bilbao: Desclée de Brouwer. 2006. ISBN 9788433020567. OCLC 752460238.
- (2004).Psicología y Psiquiatria Transcultural. Bases prácticas para la acción. Desclee de Brower. 3 February 2004. ISBN 84-330-1844-2.
- (2001).Chiapas : Fundamentos Psicológicos de una Guerra Contemporánea. GAC/PRODH. 3 February 2001. ISBN 84-88949-41-3.
- (1999).Actuaciones Psicosociales en Guerra y Violencia Política. Ex-Libris. 3 February 1999.
- (1998).Muerte y desaparición forzada en la Araucanía: una perspectiva étnica. LOM. 3 February 1998.
