= International Rehabilitation Council for Torture Victims =

Non-governmental organization

International Rehabilitation Council for Torture Victims (IRCT)
- Founded: 1985 by Inge Genefke
- Type: Non-profit; NGO
- Location: Global General secretariat in Copenhagen, Denmark
- Secretary-General: Lisa Henry
- Affiliations: Global Focus
- Award: Right Livelihood Award
- Website: irct.org

The International Rehabilitation Council for Torture Victims (IRCT) is an independent, international health professional organization that promotes and supports the rehabilitation of torture victims and works for the prevention of torture worldwide. Based in Denmark, the IRCT is the umbrella organization for over 160 independent torture rehabilitation organizations in 76 countries that treat and assist torture survivors and their families. They advocate for holistic rehabilitation for all victims of torture, which can include access to justice, reparations, and medical, psychological, and psycho-social counseling. The IRCT does this through strengthening the capacity of their membership, enabling an improved policy environment for torture victims, and generating and share knowledge on issues related to the rehabilitation of torture victims. Professionals at the IRCT rehabilitation centers and programs provide treatment for an estimated 100,000 survivors of torture every year. Victims receive multidisciplinary support including medical and psychological care and legal aid. The aim of the rehabilitation process is to empower torture survivors to resume as full a life as possible. In 1988, IRCT, along with founder Inge Genefke, was given the Right Livelihood Award "for helping those whose lives have been shattered by torture to regain their health and personality."

== History ==
The medical response to the problem of torture began in 1973 with the launch of a campaign by Amnesty International (AI) to help and diagnose torture victims. At this time, very little was known about torture methods or the physical or psychosocial consequences for torture victims. The first AI group to start this work was founded in Denmark in 1974 and consisted of four voluntary doctors. This group was part of a network of some 4,000 medical doctors from 34 countries worldwide. It quickly became evident that, in addition to documenting cases of torture for use in potential legal proceedings, it was also critical to identify methods to help treat and rehabilitate victims of torture. This resulted in the establishment in 1978 of the first medical international working group to address the rehabilitation of torture victims, which held the first international medical seminar on torture, Violations of Human Rights – Torture and the Medical Profession, in Athens, Greece. In 1979, members of the Danish medical group obtained permission to admit and examine torture victims at Copenhagen University Hospital, in Denmark. Three years later, in 1982, the Rehabilitation and Research Centre for Torture Victims (RCT) was founded in Copenhagen by Dr. Inge Genefke, MD, as an independent institution with its own premises. In response to a growing need for global support and assistance in the rehabilitation of torture victims, the International Rehabilitation Council for Torture Victims was founded in 1985, initially as the international arm of the RCT, and, from 1997, as an international and independent organization. In 2010, the IRCT celebrated its 25th anniversary.

== Members ==
The list of IRCT members includes more than 160 members in 76 countries.

== Work ==
The work of the IRCT can be divided into three areas:

- Offering rehabilitation services to torture survivors
- Countering impunity for perpetrators and promoting justice for survivors
- Raising awareness among policy-makers and citizens

The stated vision of the IRCT is "a world that values and accepts shared responsibility for the eradication of torture". The objective of the organization is to promote the provision of specialized treatment and rehabilitation services for victims of torture and to contribute to the prevention of torture globally. To further these goals, the IRCT seeks on an international basis:

- to develop and maintain an advocacy programme that accumulates, processes, and disseminates information about torture as well as the consequences and the rehabilitation of torture
- to establish international funding for rehabilitation services and programs for the prevention of torture
- to promote the education and training of relevant professionals in the medical as well as social, legal, and ethical aspects of torture
- to encourage the establishment and maintenance of rehabilitation services
- to establish and expand institutional relations in the international effort to abolish the practice of torture
- to support all other activities that may contribute to the prevention of torture, and
- to promote knowledge of and use of the Istanbul Protocol to promote access to torture survivors to high-quality medico-legal, or forensic, documentation of torture for use in legal proceedings.

The IRCT has special consultative status with the UN Economic and Social Council and the UN Department of Public Information, and participatory status with the Council of Europe. Important collaboration partners include (but are not limited to) the World Medical Association (WMA), the World Confederation of Physical Therapy (WCPT), the World Psychiatric Association (WPA), the International Council of Nurses (ICN), and Physicians for Human Rights (PHR). The IRCT also works in partnership with governments, human rights organizations, health professional organizations, and intergovernmental organizations.

=== Publications ===
- Torture, a journal on rehabilitation of torture victims and prevention of torture.

== Structure ==
The IRCT comprises four bodies: the General Assembly, the council, the executive committee, and the General Secretariat.

=== General Assembly ===
The IRCT General Assembly meets every three years and comprises accredited rehabilitation centers and programs worldwide. The General Assembly provides a forum in which representatives of rehabilitation centers and programs, and others working in related fields, may facilitate and press forward the global work against torture. The first IRCT General Assembly was conducted as a Written General Assembly on 16 June – 6 July 2003. All rehabilitation centers and programs that are accredited with the IRCT were eligible to participate in the General Assembly, the forum in which the IRCT Council is elected. A total of 94 accredited rehabilitation centers and programs participated in the 2003 IRCT Written General Assembly.

=== Council and Executive Committee ===
According to the IRCT Statutes and Bylaws, the IRCT Council is elected by the General Assembly and comprises up to 30 members, 27 representing rehabilitation centers and programs worldwide, and three independent experts. The council is the principal policy-making and advisory standard-setting body of the IRCT, and includes the seven members of the executive committee.

The allocation of seats to the IRCT Council by region is as follows:

- Europe – 7 seats
- Asia – 4 seats
- North America – 2 seats
- Latin America – 4 seats
- Sub Sahara Africa – 4 seats
- Middle East and North Africa – 3 seats
- Pacific – 2 seats
- Independent experts – 3 seats
- Country of domicile of the IRCT General Secretariat (Denmark) – 1 seat.

=== General Secretariat ===
The General Secretariat, based in Copenhagen, Denmark, is the operational body of the IRCT, responsible for the management and implementation of the IRCT's policies and programmes in support of the rehabilitation of torture victims and the prevention of torture worldwide. The General Secretariat consists of the Office of the Secretary-General, Administration and Finance Team, Communications Team, Membership Team, Health Team, Advocacy and Legal Team and Liaison Offices in Brussels and Geneva.

== See also ==
- UN International Day in Support of Victims of Torture – 26 June
- Institute of Therapy and Investigation
- Freedom from Torture
- United Nations Convention Against Torture
- Optional Protocol to the Convention against Torture and other Cruel, Inhuman or Degrading Treatment or Punishment (2006)
- Torture
- Psychology of torture
- The Secret Life of Words – 2005 film
- Committee for the Prevention of Torture
- European Convention for the Prevention of Torture and Inhuman or Degrading Treatment or Punishment
- Universal Declaration of Human Rights
