= Hague Evidence Convention =

1970 multilateral treaty

Convention on the Taking of Evidence Abroad in Civil or Commercial Matters
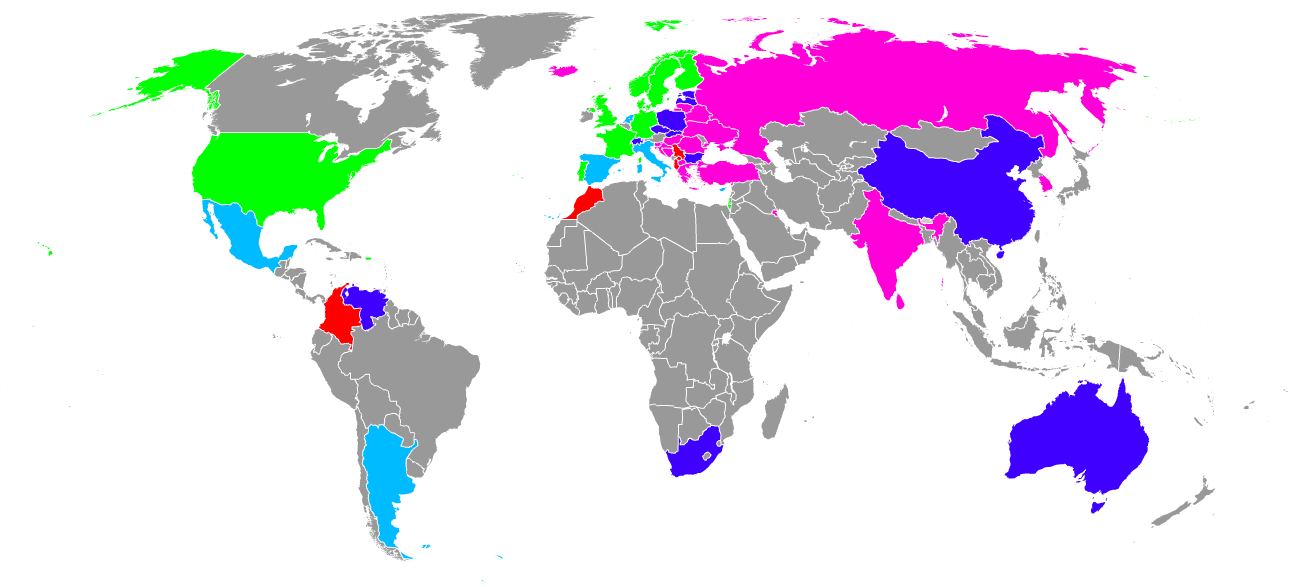
- States parties to the convention by year of ratifications: green: '70, light blue: '80, blue '90, pink '00, red '10
- Signed: 18 March 1970
- Location: The Netherlands
- Effective: 7 October 1972
- Condition: ratification by 3 states
- Parties: 69
- Depositary: Ministry of Foreign Affairs (Netherlands)
- Languages: French and English

Full text
- Convention on the Taking of Evidence Abroad in Civil or Commercial Matters at Wikisource

The Convention on the Taking of Evidence Abroad in Civil or Commercial Matters—more commonly referred to as the Hague Evidence Convention—is a multilateral treaty which was drafted under the auspices of the Hague Conference on Private International Law (HCPIL). The treaty was negotiated in 1967 and 1968 and signed in The Hague on 18 March 1970. It entered into force in 1972. It allows transmission of letters of request (letters rogatory) from one signatory state (where the evidence is sought) to another signatory state (where the evidence is located) without recourse to consular and diplomatic channels. Inside the US, obtaining evidence under the Evidence Convention can be compared to comity.

The Hague Evidence Convention was not the first convention to address the transmission of evidence from one state to another. The 1905 Civil Procedure Convention—also signed in The Hague—contained provisions dealing with the transmission of evidence. However, that earlier convention did not command wide support and was only ratified by 22 countries.

== Substantive provisions ==
=== Central authorities and procedures ===
The convention establishes a procedure whereby each contracting state designates a "central authority" to receive and review incoming "letters of request" for taking evidence in that country.

The central authority reviews the letter of request to determine that it complies with the requirements of the convention. If the letter of request does comply, the central authority then "transmits" the letter of request "to the authority competent to execute" it (article 2), which essentially means to a court.

Under Article 9, the judicial authority that executes a letter of request applies its own law as to the methods and procedures for executing the letter of request.

Under article 13, (a) the documents establishing the execution of the letter of request are to be sent by the requested authority (the recipient of the letter of request) to the requesting authority by the same channel that was used by the requesting authority, and (b) whenever the letter of request is not executed (in whole or in part), the requesting authority is to be informed immediately and advised of the reasons.

=== Pre-trial discovery ===
The convention also applies to pre-trial discovery: obtaining of evidence prior to trial without the prior approval of a judge. While this is a common practice in many common law countries, it was felt unacceptable by many others. Countries can however object to application to pre-trial discovery through an objection according to Article 23. As of April 2019, the convention applies to pre-trial discovery in 15 countries. 26 states have objected fully excluding pretrial discovery, while 17 others have restricted its applicability.

An example of a partial objection to pre-trial discovery is from Mexico, requiring the start of the judicial proceedings, identifiability of the documents and a clear relationship between the requested documents and the pending proceedings:

C) FORMULATION OF PRE-TRIAL DISCOVERY OF DOCUMENTS

4. With reference to Article 23 of the Convention, the United Mexican States declares that according to Mexican law, it shall only be able to comply with letters of request issued for the purpose of obtaining the production and transcription of documents when the following requirements are met: (a) that the judicial proceeding has been commenced; (b) that the documents are reasonably identifiable as to date, subject and other relevant information and that the request specifies those facts and circumstances that lead the requesting party to reasonable believe that the requested documents are known to the person from whom they are requested or that they are in his possession or under his control or custody;

(c) that the direct relationship between the evidence or information sought and the pending proceeding be identified.

== Parties ==
Countries that ratified (cumulative by year)

As of 2023, there are 66 states which are parties of the Hague Evidence Convention. 60 of the HCPIL member states are party to the Hague Evidence Convention. In addition, six states that are not members of the HCPIL (Barbados, Colombia, Kuwait, Liechtenstein, Nicaragua and Seychelles) have joined the Hague Evidence Convention. Article 39 of the Hague Evidence Convention expressly permits states which were not members of the HCPIL at the time of the conclusion of the treaty to accede to the convention.

State	Date of Ratification	Comments
Albania	16 July 2010	
Andorra	26 April 2017	
Argentina	8 May 1987	
Armenia	27 June 2012	
Australia	23 October 1992	
Barbados	5 March 1981	
Belarus	7 August 2001	
Bosnia and Herzegovina	16 June 2008	
Brazil	9 April 2014	
Bulgaria	23 November 1999	
China, People's Republic of	8 December 1997	including the Special Administrative Regions of Hong Kong and Macao
Colombia	13 January 2012	
Costa Rica	16 March 2016	
Croatia	1 October 2009	
Cyprus	13 January 1983	
Czech Republic	28 June 1993	succession of the ratification of Czechoslovakia in 1976
Denmark	20 June 1972	
El Salvador	19 January 2023	
Estonia	2 February 1996	
Finland	7 April 1976	
France	7 August 1974	Complete territory
Georgia	31 May 2021	
Germany	27 April 1979	
Greece	18 January 2005	
Hungary	13 July 2004	
Iceland	10 November 2008	
India	7 February 2007	
Israel	19 July 1979	
Italy	22 June 1982	
Kazakhstan	26 September 2016	
Kuwait	8 May 2002	
Latvia	28 March 1995	
Liechtenstein	12 November 2008	
Lithuania	2 August 2000	
Luxembourg	26 July 1977	
Macedonia	13 March 2009	
Malta	24 February 2011	
Montenegro	16 January 2012	

State	Date of Ratification	Comments
Mexico	27 July 1989	
Morocco	24 March 2011	
Monaco	17 January 1986	
Montenegro	16 January 2012	
Netherlands	8 April 1981	European Netherlands and Aruba
Nicaragua	27 February 2019	
Norway	3 August 1972	
Paraguay	23 June 2023	
Poland	13 February 1996	
Portugal	12 March 1975	
Romania	21 August 2003	
Russia	1 May 2001	
Serbia	2 July 2010	
Seychelles	7 January 2004	
Singapore	27 October 1978	
Slovakia	15 March 1993	succession of the ratification of Czechoslovakia in 1976
Slovenia	18 November 2000	
South Africa	8 July 1997	
South Korea	14 December 2009	
Spain	22 May 1987	
Sri Lanka	30 October 2000	
Sweden	2 May 1975	
Switzerland	2 November 1994	
Turkey	13 August 2004	
Ukraine	1 February 2001	
United Kingdom	16 July 1976	Including Akrotiri and Dhekelia, Anguilla, Cayman Islands, Falkland Islands, Gibraltar, Guernsey, Isle of Man, Jersey
United States	8 August 1972	Including Guam, Puerto Rico and the Virgin Islands
Venezuela	1 November 1993	
Vietnam	3 May 2020	

== Practical operation in member states ==
At least two member states authorise private lawyers to be involved in the evidence-gathering process. Under the law of the British Virgin Islands, if a witness is summoned to testify pursuant to a letter of request, a legal practitioner for any party may administer the oath to the witness.

The availability of a private lawyer to be directly involved is even more broad under Israeli law. As noted above, Israel has not issued an article 23 declaration. Israeli law provides, pursuant to the Legal Assistance Among States Law 1998, for the possibility of the appointment of a private lawyer to oversee the process of taking evidence under the convention. That statute also governs the procedure for evidence-gathering in Israel in aid of foreign criminal investigations. As a result, even in civil matters (including Hague Evidence Convention requests), the Israeli court system usually assigns letters of request to judges in the criminal division. Due to that allocation, most Israeli decisions issued in connection with international evidence-gathering are stamped "closed doors," which essentially means that it is unlawful to publish the decision.

The American Bar Association conducted a survey to receive feedback from American lawyers concerning their experience with the letter of request procedures under the Hague Evidence Convention. The ABA published the results of the survey in October 2003, and its Conclusions section begins as follows:

The Hague Evidence Convention has been remarkably successful in bridging differences between the common law and civil law approaches to obtaining evidence and has significantly streamlined the procedures for compulsion of evidence from abroad.

== Obtaining evidence outside the convention ==
Insofar as requests to United States courts are concerned, parties may also use the simpler discovery provision codified at 28 United States Code § 1782 (see Section 1782 Discovery).

Between states of the European Union, the convention has largely been supplanted by Council Regulation (EC) No. 1206/2001 on Cooperation Between the Courts of the Member States in the Taking of Evidence in Civil or Commercial Matters.
