= Evidence Regulation =

Regulation (EC) No 1783/2020
- European Union regulation
- Title: Regulation (EU) 2020/1783 of the European Parliament and of the Council of 25 November 2020 on cooperation between the courts of the Member States in the taking of evidence in civil or commercial matters (taking of evidence) (recast) [2020] OJ L405/1
- Applicability: All EU countries except Denmark
- Made by: Council
- Made under: Article 81(2) of the Treaty on the Functioning of the European Union
- Journal reference: OJ L 405/1

History
- Date made: 25 November 2020
- Entry into force: 25 November 2020

Other legislation
- Replaces: Council Regulation (EC) No 1206/2001 of 28 May 2001 on cooperation between the courts of the Member States in the taking of evidence in civil or commercial matters (OJ L 174, 27.6.2001, p. 1).

Regulation (EU) No. 1783/2020 of 25 November 2020 on cooperation between the courts of the Member States in the taking of evidence in civil or commercial matters (taking of evidence) replaced the earlier Council Regulation (EC) No 1206/2001 of 28 May 2001 on cooperation in taking of evidence. It is a European Union regulation in the field of judicial cooperation. It allows taking of evidence from one member state to another without recourse to consular and diplomatic channels. The regulation applies to all the member states of the European Union with the exception of Denmark.

Taking of evidence in civil cases prior to the regulation was done either under the Hague Evidence Convention or by means of a letter rogatory (also called a letter of request), a formal request from a court in one country to take evidence to another in which the witness is domiciled. This formal document usually required transmission from the originating court to the Ministry of Foreign Affairs (MFA) in the state of origin, who then forwarded it, possibly through various embassies, to the MFA in the destination state. The foreign MFA would then pass the documents to the judicial authorities in that state, who would then go about obtaining the required evidence. The evidence would then be returned via the same long winded channels.

This regulation enables a somewhat simplified route by allowing direct contact between the courts in the member states. A standardised request form included in the annex to the regulation must be used. This aids the process by being widely recognised by the relevant authorities. The regulation also contains various articles to promote the use of communication technologies such as telephone conferencing and videoconferencing.
