= European Enforcement Order =

Method of enforcing foreign judgments within the EU

The European Enforcement Order (EEO) is a method of enforcing foreign judgments within the European Union without the need of any intermediate proceedings, such as exequatur. The procedure was established by Council Regulation (EC) 805/2004 of 21 April 2004 and came into force on 21 October 2005.

== Regulation ==
The EEO is applicable only in relation to uncontested claims. Uncontested claims are defined in Article 3 of the regulation as one of the following:

1. the debtor has expressly agreed to it by admission or by means of a settlement which has been approved by a court or concluded before a court in the course of proceedings; or
2. the debtor has never objected to it, in compliance with the relevant procedural requirements under the law of the Member State of origin (where judgment was given or the claim arose); or
3. after initial objection, the debtor has never appeared or been represented at court, provided that such conduct amounts to a tacit admission of the claim or of the facts alleged by the creditor under the law of the Member State of origin; or
4. the debtor has expressly agreed to it in an “authentic instrument” i.e. a document whose contents and signature have been ‘authenticated’ by a public authority.

The regulation provides a mechanism whereby if the defendant objects to the use of the EEO, the matter can become a Court case which can then be defended.

The EEO can be only be used in civil or commercial matters and specifically does not apply to the status or legal capacity of natural persons, rights in property arising out of a matrimonial relationship, wills and succession; bankruptcy, proceedings relating to the winding-up of insolvent companies or other legal persons, judicial arrangements, compositions and analogous proceedings; social security; arbitration.

However, Article 10 of Regulation 805/2004 requires that any application to rectify or withdraw a European Enforcement Order; whether upon any of the above bases or on any other basis; may only be made by application to the court of origin which made the European Enforcement Order Certificate (EEOC) in the first place – that is to say, any such application to withdraw or rectify an EEOC may only be made before the court of the State of Origin which originally made the EEOC.

== Effect ==
The effect of these provisions and the intention, is to prevent judgment debtors challenging European Enforcement Orders in the State of Enforcement without first having recourse to the State of Origin where the EEOC was originally made. The only exceptions to this general rule arise under Article 21 of Regulation 805/2004 which allows judgment debtors to challenge an EEOC if there has been an earlier judgment pre-dating the judgment forming the basis of the EEOC, which involved the same parties and the same cause of action and which is irreconcilable with the EEOC and/or where the EEO Certificate itself is plainly defective because the Court of Origin which made the EEOC failed to comply with the minimum standards for making EEOCs as set out in Regulation 805/2004. An example of a failure to comply with minimum standards would be where the Court of Origin failed to tick all of the boxes demonstrating that service was properly effected on the judgment debtor.
