= Joy Ezeilo =

Nigerian lawyer

Prof Joy Ezeilo
- Born: Joy Ngozi Ezeilo
- Citizenship: Nigeria
- Occupations: Barrister; Academic
- Awards: 2022 BBC 100 Women

Academic background
- Education: University of Nigeria, Nsukka

Joy Ngozi Ezeilo is a Nigerian professor of public law, a Senior Advocate of Nigeria, an activist, and a six-year United Nations Special Rapporteur on Trafficking persons in Africa. She is also a former Commissioner for Gender and Social Development, Enugu State. She was a former Dean and HOD of faculty of law University of Nigeria Nsukka and the founder of the Women Aid Collective (WACOL). She is a recipient of Officer of the Order of Niger (OON) and one of the 2022 BBC 100 Women

== Early life and education ==
Joy was born in 1966 at Enugu in Nigeria. She earned her Ph.D. in Nigeria, LLM in London LL.B. also in Nigeria BL, Diploma, Peace & Conflict Resolution in Uppsala.

== Career ==
Joy became a professor of Law in 2011. She was part of the United Nations Civil Society Advisory Board on Prevention of Sexual Exploitation and Abuse between Feb 2019 to Feb 2022. In 2013, she was selected by the UN Secretary-General as one of the members of the Board of Trustees UN Trust Fund for Victims of Trafficking that is managed by the UNODC Vienna, Austria. In Nigeria, she is the Chairperson of the Sexual Assault Referral Network (SARC), a co-chair of Africa Advisory Committee, Human Rights Watch, Africa Division, and a Council Member Human Rights Institute of the Nigerian Bar Association (NBA). Between 2012 and 2015, Ezeilo was nominated as a Commissioner for Gender and Social Development in Enugu State. She delivered the 144th Inaugural Lecture of the University of Nigeria on October 11, 2018. It was entitled, "`Are we born free or equal? Law, Justice and Human Rights in Nigeria’." On December 19, 2023, she was appointed a member of the United Nations' Independent International Fact-Finding Mission for Sudan, working alongside Mohamed Chande Othman of Tanzania and Mona Rishmawi of Jordan/Switzerland on the mission.

== Awards ==
In 1995, Joy won British Chevening School Scholarship. In 1998, she won the MacArthur Funds for Leadership Development. In 2006, she was honoured with a Nigerian Government national honour of Officer of the Order of Nigeria (OON) by President Olusegun Obasanjo (GCFR). In 2013, she was named in Newsweek & Daily Beast of 125 Women of Impact worldwide. In 2019, she won the National Human Rights Award and the Hon. Justice Taslim Elias Award (given to law professors who had taught for over twenty-five years in Nigerian universities). On March 5, 2022, she was given the civil society award of Excellence by the United Nations Development Programme (UNDP). In 2022, she was awarded as one of the 2022 BBC 100 Women. On March 5, 2022, she was honoured with the Civil Society Award of Excellence by the United Nations Development Programme (UNDP)/ UN Women in collaboration with the Embassies of the United States of America, Germany, France, EU Delegation and the British High Commission to commemorate the International Women’s Day Awards Gala.

== Personal life ==
She is a high Chief in Igboland bestowed with the triple chieftaincy of Ochendo, Ada ejiejemba Ndi Igbo, and Nzebuna chi. She was married to the late Dr. Augustine Ezenta Ezeilo, and they have adult children and grandchildren.
