= Judicial assistance =

International cooperation between courts

Judicial assistance is the admittance and enforcement of a judicial order or request by a court from one jurisdiction to a court in another jurisdiction. Such admittance sometimes requires a treaty between the governments of the two jurisdictions. Without a treaty, judicial assistance can also take place in individual case on an ad hoc basis. In common law jurisdictions, if a judicial assistance treaty is not in effect then the extra-jurisdictional order may be only admitted as evidence in separate litigation covering the same matter.

== Common orders in judicial assistance ==
- Service of documents
- Taking evidence
- Marriage license & Divorce
- Arbitration award
- Lien
- Damages
- Liquidation

== See also ==
- Letter rogatory
- Mutual legal assistance treaty
