= Section 1782 discovery =

Section 1782 of Title 28 of the United States Code is a federal statute that allows a litigant (party) to a legal proceeding outside the United States to apply to an American court to obtain evidence for use in the non-US proceeding, a process known as discovery. The full name of Section 1782 is "Assistance to foreign and international tribunals and to litigants before such tribunals".

The text of Section 1782(a) reads as follows:

The district court of the district in which a person resides or is found may order him to give his testimony or statement or to produce a document or other thing for use in a proceeding in a foreign or international tribunal, including criminal investigations conducted before formal accusation. The order may be made pursuant to a letter rogatory issued, or request made, by a foreign or international tribunal or upon the application of any interested person. ... The order may prescribe the practice and procedure, which may be in whole or part the practice and procedure of the foreign country or the international tribunal, for taking the testimony or statement or producing the document or other thing. To the extent that the order does not prescribe otherwise, the testimony or statement shall be taken, and the document or other thing produced, in accordance with the Federal Rules of Civil Procedure.

A person may not be compelled to give his testimony or statement or to produce a document or other thing in violation of any legally applicable privilege.

In essence, an applicant under Section 1782 needs to show three things:

- (a) it is an "interested person" in a foreign proceeding,
- (b) the proceeding is before a foreign "tribunal", and
- (c) the person from whom evidence is sought is in the district of the court before which the application has been filed.

The type of evidence that may be obtained under Section 1782 includes both documentary evidence and testimonial evidence.

The Court then has a discretion whether to grant the discovery requested. Following the Intel decision (discussed below) the factors relevant to the exercise of this discretion include the following:

(1) whether the person from whom discovery is sought is a participant in the foreign proceeding;
(2) the nature of the foreign tribunal and the character of the proceedings;
(3) whether the application conceals an attempt to circumvent foreign proof-gathering restrictions or other policies; and
(4) whether the discovery sought is unduly intrusive or burdensome.

== The Intel decision ==
For many years, district courts and appellate courts disagreed as to

- (a) the scope of permitted discovery (evidence-taking) under Section 1782,
- (b) who may request section 1782 discovery,
- (c) at what stage of a non-US proceeding a section 1782 order may be granted,
- (d) the meaning of the statute's term "tribunal", and
- (e) whether an applicant under section 1782 needs to show that the requested evidence would be "discoverable" in the foreign jurisdiction.

The case law concerning Section 1782 was largely clarified in 2004, when the Supreme Court of the United States issued its decision in Intel Corp. v. Advanced Micro Devices, Inc. Intel held that

- (a) section 1782 discovery may be sought by any "interested person",
- (b) such discovery may sometimes be sought even prior to the initiation of formal proceedings outside the United States, and
- (c) a "tribunal" within the meaning of the section is any tribunal that acts as a "first instance decisionmaker".

The court also largely did away with any requirement of "discoverability" before the non-US tribunal.

In essence, Intel held that section 1782 discovery is available to a non-US litigant almost as freely as discovery is available in connection with a lawsuit that is pending entirely before a court in the United States.

Section 1782 has received great attention in recent years, following Intel.

== Use of Section 1782 versus use of the Hague Evidence Convention ==
The subject matter of Section 1782 – obtaining evidence in the US for use in legal proceedings outside the United States – overlaps to some extent with the subject matter of a treaty to which the US and approximately sixty nations are signatories, the Hague Evidence Convention.

In at least two respects, when a non-US litigant seeks evidence from the United States, there is an advantage in using section 1782 over the Hague Evidence Convention:

- there is no need to have first requested the discovery from the non-US tribunal; and
- sometimes discovery can be granted even before a lawsuit is commenced outside the United States.

== Applications ==
In the post-Intel era, most applications under section 1782 have been filed by companies from the United Kingdom, Germany, and other European countries. There has been an increase in recent years in applications from Middle Eastern countries.

Other than Japan, few Asian litigants have filed section 1782 applications in recent years.

In 2010, Chevron Corporation filed several section 1782 applications to obtain evidence in connection with the defense of product liability claims brought against it in the Republic of Ecuador.

Many observers believe that cost considerations have been one of the reasons that Section 1782 has not been used more extensively.

== Controversy ==
Not all American lawyers or businesspeople believe that section 1782 discovery is a good thing.

The United States Chamber of Commerce has expressed concerns as to the burden upon American businesses in having to comply with orders to produce evidence under Section 1782. That concern was echoed by Justice Stephen Breyer in his dissent in the Supreme Court's Intel decision. Justice Breyer stated that "discovery and discovery-related judicial proceedings take time, they are expensive, and cost and delay, or threats of cost and delay, can themselves force parties to settle underlying disputes." Nevertheless, having American courts give effect to discovery under section 1782 has been justified to "encourage foreign countries by example to provide similar means of assistance to our courts".

Writing in the International Practicum of the New York State Bar Association (1999), Hugh L. Burns and Sharad A. Samy (both New York) have referred to section 1782 as the international litigant's discovery "weapon of choice".

In a commentary in Mealey's International Arbitration Report, Barry Garfinkel and Timothy Nelson (both New York), discussed a decision of a federal district court in Georgia that permitted Section 1782 discovery in connection with a non-US arbitration. Entitling their commentary "Sweet Georgia", Garfinkel and Nelson called the Georgian decision "ground breaking". Writing in the New York Law Journal in May 2007, Eric Schwartz and Alan Howard (both New York) expressed a critical view of the Georgia case and of the apparent trend that it represented. Schwartz and Howard predicted that the pro-discovery ruling from Georgia could result in "the doors of the U.S. federal courts [swinging] open to a flood of future applications for the discovery of evidence against U.S. businesses for use in international arbitration proceedings" (emphasis added). Schwartz and Howard further asserted that such possibility should be "cause for alarm" for the U.S. business community.

Subsequently, the US Supreme Court ruled that Section 1782 discovery is not available in respect of a non-US commercial arbitration or an ad hoc UNCITRAL investor-state arbitration. This is discussed further below.

Writing in the International Litigation Quarterly (of the American Bar Association) in March 2008, Eric Sherby (Israel) rejected the contention that section 1782 imposes too much of a burden on Corporate America. Focusing on five cases from the mid-1990s through 2006, Sherby argued that the availability of Section 1782 discovery makes it more likely that an American court will grant a forum non conveniens (inconvenient forum) dismissal in many lawsuits brought against American defendants. As a result, Sherby further argued, Section 1782 is a blessing in disguise for those American companies that are engaged in international commerce yet do not want to be sued in American courts in connection with those activities.

Writing in a newsletter of the ABA's Committee on Pretrial Practice & Discovery, Jonathan I. Handler and Erica Tennyson have observed that Section 1782 "may lead to nonreciprocal access to discovery and may even allow private litigants to exploit the statute to obtain information about a competitor and force an adversary to settle the underlying dispute." At the same time, Handler and Tennyson note that these "potential inequities" can be offset by a district court's broad discretion in deciding whether and to what extent to grant Section 1782 requests.

The section 1782 litigation that has received the most attention has involved Chevron Corporation, which brought several section 1782 motions in various courts throughout the United States in connection with a massive tort claim against Chevron in Ecuador.

== Application to non-US arbitrations ==
The Federal appellate courts had been divided as to whether a non-US arbitration constitutes a "foreign or international tribunal" for the purposes of 1782 discovery. The Second, Fifth, and Seventh Circuits had held that a private arbitration does not fall within the definition of tribunal under the statute. The Fourth and Sixth Circuits had taken the contrary view as to private arbitrations. The Second Circuit had held that a specific investor-state arbitration fell within the definition (but had declined to rule that all such arbitrations would do so). Some courts had undertaken a "functional analysis" and considered several factors to determine whether an adjudicatory body is a "tribunal" for the purposes of the statute.

The United States Department of Justice took the position that an arbitral tribunal is not a foreign tribunal under the statute.

This issue has now been determined by the US Supreme Court. In ZF Automotive US, Inc. v Luxshare, Ltd., 596 US (2022) (decided June 13, 2022, together with AlixPartners LLP v The Fund for Protection of Investor Rights in Foreign States), the Court unanimously held that Section 1782 did not apply to a commercial international arbitration or an ad hoc UNCITRAL investor-state arbitration. The Court reversed the decisions of the Sixth and Second Circuits on these issues. The Court concluded thus (at page 16):

"In sum, only a governmental or intergovernmental adjudicative body constitutes a “foreign or international tribunal” under §1782. Such bodies are those that exercise governmental authority conferred by one nation or multiple nations. Neither the private commercial arbitral panel in the first case nor the ad hoc arbitration panel in the second case qualifies."

The Court (at page 15) left open the possibility that some investor-state arbitrations might qualify as foreign tribunals, on a case by case basis, holding as follows:

"None of this forecloses the possibility that sovereigns might imbue an ad hoc arbitration panel with official authority. Governmental and intergovernmental bodies may take many forms, and we do not attempt to prescribe how they should be structured. The point is only that a body does not possess governmental authority just because nations agree in a treaty to submit to arbitration before it. The relevant question is whether the nations intended that the ad hoc panel exercise governmental authority. And here, all indications are that they did not."

Following ZF, in In re Alpene 2022 WL 15497008 (Oct. 27, 2022), the Eastern District of New York held that section 1782 discovery was not available in relation to an investor-State arbitration under the auspices of the International Centre for the Settlement of Investment Disputes (ICSID). The Court found that there was “insufficient support” for the argument that Malta and China (the two relevant States) had “intended to imbue the ICSID arbitration panel with government authority".

The Southern District of New York reached the same conclusion as to an ICSID arbitral panel in In Re: Application of Webuild S.p.A. and Sacyr S.A. 2022 WL 17807321 (Dec. 19, 2022).

== Remaining areas of uncertainty ==
The case law so far is split as to whether a section 1782 order may compel a person located in the United States to produce documents that are located outside the US. Sherby has argued that most cases that have addressed the subject do not expressly hold that there is any geographical limitation to section 1782 and that, in determining whether to apply section 1782 to documents outside the US, the main issue that courts have considered is whether there is evidence indicating either (1) that the applicant is trying to circumvent a restriction of the foreign tribunal or (2) that an order of production would interfere with the foreign proceedings.

The U.S. Court of Appeals for the Ninth Circuit declined to rule on the point in Four Pillars Enterprises Co v Avery Dennison Corp 308 F3d 1075 (2002). The Seventh Circuit refused extraterritorial discovery in Kestrel v. Joy Global, 362 F.3d 401 (2004), but this appears mainly to have been because the documents sought were outside the target company's files. The District Court for the District of Columbia ruled against extra territorial discovery in Norex Petroleum Ltd v Chubb Ins Co of Canada 384 F Supp 2d 45 (2005). Subsequently, however, the Eleventh Circuit allowed extraterritorial discovery in Sergeeva v Tripleton Int’l Limited 834 F3d 1194 (2016). The Second Circuit then held in In re del Valle Ruiz 939 F3d 520 (2019) that Section 1782 does not contain any categorical bar to extraterritorial discovery. Other Circuits have not addressed the issue.

In Fleischmann v. McDonald’s Corp., 466 F. Supp. 2d 1020 (2006), the District Court for the Northern District of Illinois took the view that Section 1782 permits orders requiring non-parties to produce documents and to give oral testimony by deposition, but not orders to answer written interrogatories. At least one 2007 case, however, did require a non-party to answer interrogatories.

Interrogatories were ordered by the District Court for the District of Columbia in In re Application of The Islamic Republic of Pakistan for an Order Permitting Discovery Pursuant to 28 U.S.C. § 1782, Misc. Action No. 18-103 (D.D.C. April 10, 2019).

In Minatec Finance S.A.R.L. v. SI Group, Inc., No. 1:08-CV-269 (LEK/RFT), 2008 WL3884374 (August 18, 2008) the District Court for the Northern District of New York held that a German tax auditing procedure is a "tribunal" for the purposes of Section 1782 discovery.
