= Torture (journal) =

- Discipline: Rehabilitation medicine] [Human Rights] [Torture
- Language: English
- Edited by: Pau Pérez-Sales

Publication details
- History: 1991–present
- Publisher: International Rehabilitation Council for Torture Victims
- Frequency: Triannually
- Open access: Yes

Standard abbreviations
- ISO 4: Torture

Indexing
- ISSN: 1018-8185 (print); 1997-3322 (web)
- OCLC no.: 29707439

Links
- Journal homepage; Online archive

Torture: Journal on Rehabilitation of Torture Victims and Prevention of Torture is a peer-reviewed medical journal on rehabilitation of torture victims and prevention of torture, published triannually by the International Rehabilitation Council for Torture Victims.

== History ==
The Torture: Journal on Rehabilitation of Torture Victims and Prevention of Torture was established in 1991 as Torture: Quarterly Journal on Rehabilitation of Torture Victims and Prevention of Torture. It began as a newsletter for IRCT members, focused on sharing best practices in the treatment of torture survivors. Today, it has become a global publication with a broad reach, being included in relevant databases such as MEDLINE and Scopus. It has evolved beyond the investigation of physical methods of torture to explore lesser-known clinical areas related to psychological torture, such as sleep deprivation, use of white rooms, and domestic violence. The Journal features thematic issues that address topics such as gender, enforced disappearances, and the documentation of torture in children, consolidating diverse specializations in one place. The journal obtained its current title in 2004.

== Abstracting and indexing ==
The journal is abstracted and indexed in MEDLINE/PubMed.
