= Encore Capital Group =

American financial-services company

Encore Capital Group, Inc.
- Company type: Public
- Traded as: Nasdaq: ECPG; S&P 600 component
- Industry: Financial services, Debt buyer Debt-collection
- Founded: 1953; 73 years ago
- Headquarters: San Diego, California, United States
- Key people: Ashish Masih, (president & CEO)
- Products: Specialty finance
- Services: Collections and recoveries
- Revenue: ▲US$ 1.4 billion (FY 2018)
- Number of employees: 8,300 Globally
- Subsidiaries: Midland Credit Management
- Website: encorecapital.com

Encore Capital Group, Inc. is a publicly traded debt buyer based in the United States. The company is headquartered in San Diego, and operates throughout the United States. The firm is a publicly traded NASDAQ Global Select company (ECPG), a component stock of the Russell 2000, the S&P SmallCap 600, and the Wilshire 4500.

== History ==
Encore Capital Group's subsidiary company, Midland Credit Management, Inc., through which it purchases all of its debt, was founded in 1953 and was incorporated in Kansas in September 1953. In 1998, an investor group led by Nelson Peltz and Peter May and Kerry Packer of Consolidated Press International Holdings Limited, acquired a majority interest in its operations.

The group formed a holding company, which it incorporated in Delaware in April 1999 as MCM Capital Group, Inc., later renamed Encore Capital Group, Inc. in April 2002. The company completed its initial public offering of 2,250,000 shares of common stock in July 1999. Encore Capital is the largest publicly traded United States debt buyer by revenue.

Ashish Masih is Encore Capital's president and chief executive officer. Masih joined Encore Capital in 2009.

In June, 2013, Encore acquired Asset Acceptance Corporation, a debt buyer based in Warren, Michigan. In 2014, Encore Capital acquired Virginia-based Atlantic Credit & Finance.

In January 2015, New York State Attorney General Eric Schneiderman sued Encore Capital over unethical practices and forced Encore Capital to pay a $675,000 penalty and vacate more than 4,500 court judgments against borrowers.

In September 2015, both Encore and Portfolio Recovery Associates, the United States’ two largest publicly held debt buyers, were charged with violating the Fair Debt Collection Practices Act and the Dodd–Frank Wall Street Reform and Consumer Protection Act by filing "lawsuits against consumers without having the intent to prove many of the debts, winning the vast majority of the lawsuits by default when consumers failed to defend themselves."

The Consumer Financial Protection Bureau imposed an enforcement action on Encore Capital for pressuring borrowers "to pay with false statements, with lawsuits and with the use of using so-called robo-signed court documents." According to The New York Times, Encore paid "$42 million in consumer refunds and a $10 million penalty" and an injunction to "stop collections on debts totaling more than $125 million."

On June 6, 2017, Encore Capital announced the launch of its financial literacy program, Money Matters, which sends employee volunteers to teach high school and college students financial literacy.

In 2018, Encore fully acquired British debt buyer Cabot Financial.

In September 2020, the Consumer Financial Protection Bureau filed a lawsuit against Encore Capital and its subsidiary Cabot Financial. In October 2020, Encore Capital agreed to pay an addition $78,308.81 in consumer redress as well as an additional $15 million in civil money penalty as directed by the CFPB. Encore is subject to five years of monitoring, ending the consent order and resolving further litigation.
