= Midland Credit Management =

American debt buyer and debt collection company

Midland Credit Management, Inc.
- Type: Subsidiary
- Founded: 1953; 73 years ago
- Key people: Ryan Bell (president)
- Number of employees: 4,000 (2017)
- Parent: Encore Capital Group
- Website: www.midlandcredit.com

Midland Credit Management, Inc. is an American debt buyer and debt collection company headquartered in San Diego, California, and has offices throughout the United States as well as in India and Costa Rica. It is a wholly owned subsidiary of Encore Capital Group (Nasdaq: ECPG). It is one of the largest debt collectors in the United States.

== History ==
Midland Credit Management, Inc., was founded in 1953 and incorporated in 1953. The company is a wholly owned subsidiary of Encore Capital Group. In 1998, an investor group led by Nelson Peltz, Peter May and Kerry Packer acquired a majority interest in its operations. That year, the company announced plans to double employment in its East Phoenix, Arizona call centers, with the end goal of employing 2,000 people in the region.

In 1999, Midland Credit Management became part of a publicly traded company when its parent company, MCM Capital Group, Inc. completed its initial public offering. In 2002, MCM Capital Group, Inc. was renamed Encore Capital Group, Inc., and Midland Credit Management is now a wholly owned subsidiary of Encore Capital Group.

== Operations ==
Midland Credit Management is a purchaser and collector of debt in the United States. According to ConsumerAffairs, as of 2021 more than 7 million consumers had paid off debt to Midland Credit Management.

== Lawsuits, fines and controversies ==
In 2013, the Southern District Court of New York ruled that Midland had the right to charge the same interest rate as charged by the bank that made the loan, finding that the terms of the loan were legally "valid when made". In 2015, the Second Circuit Court of Appeals overturned the Southern District Court's decision, ruling that Midland Credit Management did not qualify for usury protection.

After the Supreme Court of the United States refused to review the case in 2016, the Second Circuit Court ruled in 2019 that Midland Credit Management was not protected under the National Bank Act. The Office of the Comptroller of the Currency (OCC) issued a final rule to address the legal uncertainties caused by the Second Circuit Court of Appeal's decision and codified "valid when made".

In September 2015, Midland Credit Management entered into a consent order with the Consumer Financial Protection Bureau (CFPB) regarding violations to the Consumer Financial Protection Act, the Fair Debt Collection Practices Act, and the Fair Credit Reporting Act. In 2020, the CFPB filed a suit alleging the company violated the terms of the consent order. The suit was settled with a $15 million civil money penalty.

The company was one of the debt collectors investigated in the book Bad Paper by Jake Halpern. In 2016, John Oliver mentioned Midland Credit Management as part of a segment on debt collection on his show Last Week Tonight with John Oliver.
