= Rotkiske v. Klemm =

2019 United States Supreme Court opinion

- Supreme Court of the United States

Argued October 18, 2019 Decided December 10, 2019
- Full case name: Rotkiske v. Klemm et al
- Docket no.: 18-328
- Citations: 589 U.S. 8 (more) 140 S. Ct. 355; 205 L. Ed. 2d 291

Case history
- Prior: Claim dismissed, Rotkiske v. Klemm, No. 15-cv-3638, 2016 WL 1021140 (E.D. Pa. Mar. 15, 2016); affirmed, 890 F.3d 422 (3d Cir. 2018); cert. granted, 139 S. Ct. 1259 (2019).

Holding
- The statute of limitations for private rights of action under the Fair Debt Collection Practices Act of 1977 begins to run when the violation occurs, not when the victim discovers it.

Court membership
- Chief Justice John Roberts Associate Justices Clarence Thomas · Ruth Bader Ginsburg; Stephen Breyer · Samuel Alito; Sonia Sotomayor · Elena Kagan; Neil Gorsuch · Brett Kavanaugh

Case opinions
- Majority: Thomas, joined by Roberts, Breyer, Alito, Sotomayor, Kagan, Gorsuch, Kavanaugh
- Concurrence: Sotomayor
- Dissent: Ginsburg

Laws applied
- Fair Debt Collection Practices Act

Rotkiske v. Klemm, 589 U.S. 8 (2019), was a decision by the Supreme Court of the United States involving the statute of limitations under the Fair Debt Collection Practices Act of 1977. The Court ruled that the statute of limitations begins one year after the alleged FDCPA violation took place, not one year after the violation was discovered by the plaintiff. This ruling affirmed a decision by the 3rd Circuit Court of Appeals. It is noteworthy for being the first signed opinion released from the 2019 term. It is also noteworthy for resolving a circuit split regarding a major consumer protection law.

== Background ==
=== Legal concepts ===
==== The Fair Debt Collection Practices Act ====
In 1977, Congress enacted the Fair Debt Collection Practices Act (FDCPA), a landmark consumer protection law which established federal legal protections against abusive or unfair debt collection practices. It enacted regulations on the way debt collectors could conduct business, including requirements for serving notice of collection lawsuits to debtors. The FDCPA is enforced by a variety of federal agencies, primarily the Consumer Financial Protection Bureau (CFPB) and the Federal Trade Commission (FTC). The FDCPA also establishes a private right of action; this allows private individuals who are harmed by unlawful debt collection practices to file lawsuits against the debt collector on their own.

==== Tolling ====
In law, tolling is a legal doctrine that allows for the delay or pausing of a statute of limitations. (That is, the statute of limitations can be 'tolled' (paused) for a period of time, granting one party additional time to file a lawsuit). Even if a statute doesn't explicitly contain a provision for tolling, courts can sometimes toll a statute of limitations under the principle of equity, generally when the plaintiff—through no fault of their own—was denied their ability to file suit in a timely manner.

=== Case history ===
The plaintiff, Rotkiske, accrued approximately $1,200 in credit card debt between 2003 and 2005. After he failed to pay the debt, his bank turned to a professional debt-collection firm called Klemm & Associates.

Klemm first attempted to sue Rotkiske in Philadelphia Municipal Court in March 2008. However, it served the notification of the lawsuit to an old address, where a stranger at that address accepted the notification. When Klemm learned that they had the wrong address, they dropped the suit. In 2009, Klemm filed suit for the second time, sending the notification of the lawsuit the same address as in 2008 where, again, a stranger accepted the notification. When Rotkiske failed to appear, the Philadelphia Municipal Court entered a default judgment against him.

In September 2014, Rotkiske discovered the default judgment on his record when he was denied a mortgage because of it. In June 2015, Rotkiske filed a federal lawsuit under the Fair Debt Collection Practices Act in the federal court.

== In lower courts ==
Rotkiske's federal lawsuit was first heard by the Eastern District of Pennsylvania. Rotkiske argued that Klemm had violated the Fair Debt Collection Practices Act when it filed its second lawsuit against him in 2009, after the state-law statute of limitations had expired. He argued that Klemm should not have even attempted to contact him when it knew it did not have the legal ability to collect. Klemm responded by filing a motion to dismiss, arguing that the FDCPA provides a 1-year statute of limitations for private suits, which had long expired by 2015.

Rotkiske acknowledged that he had filed his lawsuit extremely late. However, in his filing he argued that the doctrine of equitable tolling meant that the statute of limitations should not have begun until 2014 (when he discovered the default judgment while applying for his mortgage). He argued that the doctrine of equitable tolling applied to his case because Klemm committed fraud by deliberately sending the notification of the 2009 lawsuit to an address that they knew was incorrect, thus depriving him of the ability to appear in court. This practice, colloquially known as sewer service (in reference to the act of "serving" court papers to someone by dumping them in a sewer), is prohibited by law. He also argued in the alternative that the statute of limitations would not begin until he discovered the default judgment on his record.

In March 2016 Eastern District court sided with Klemm, dismissing Rotkiske's lawsuit over the statute of limitations issue. The judge ruled that the statute of limitations continues to run even if the plaintiff did not know about the FDCPA violation. They also rejected his argument regarding equitable tolling, ruling that, even if Klemm had deliberately sent the notification to the wrong house, Rotkiske had not been misled by their conduct Rotkiske appealed to the 3rd Circuit Court of Appeals, which in a unanimous en banc ruling authored by Judge Thomas Hardiman, upheld the Eastern District court's ruling against him in May 2018. The precedent established by the 3rd Circuit contradicted rulings from the 4th Circuit and the 9th Circuit, each of which had previously held that the statute of limitations begins to toll from the date the violation was discovered, not when it occurred.

Rotkiske appealed again, this time to the United States Supreme Court. The Supreme Court granted his application for a writ of certiorari, agreeing to hear the case, on February 25, 2019.

Before the Supreme Court, Rotkiske was represented by Scott Gant of the prominent firm Boies Schiller Flexner LLP. Shay Dvoretzky from Jones Day argued the case on behalf of Klemm.

== Supreme Court opinion ==
On December 10, 2019, the United States Supreme Court ruled that the one-year filing deadline for FDCPA lawsuits runs from the date when the alleged violation occurs.

=== Majority opinion ===
In the 8–1 majority opinion, authored by Justice Clarence Thomas, the Court applied a textualist reading of the FDCPA and found that the plain language of the law was unambiguous: an FDCPA action "may be brought [...] within one year from the date on which the violation occurs", with no mention of "discovery rule" extending the deadline to file to one year after the violation was discovered by the plaintiff. The majority opinion rejected Rotkiske's wish to incorporate a discovery rule into the FDCPA, describing such an expansive application of the discovery rule as a "bad wine of recent vintage". The opinion noted that Congress could have chosen to include a discovery rule in the law but deliberately chose not to, making it inappropriate for the Supreme Court to add that to the law. It also noted that, though Rotkiske had made an argument based on equitable tolling and fraud in the District Court, he chose not to raise that argument in his appeal, thus preventing the Supreme Court from addressing it.

=== Concurrence ===
In her concurrence, Justice Sonia Sotomayor agreed with the majority opinion's interpretation of the FDCPA and its ruling against Rotkiske. She wrote separately to challenge the majority's assertion that the discovery rule was a "bad wine of recent vintage", noting that the Supreme Court had long recognized this exception to the statutes of limitation for suits based on fraud or concealment, including Holmberg v. Armbrecht (1946), Exploration Co. v. United States (1918), and Bailey v. Glover (1875).

=== Dissent ===
Justice Ruth Bader Ginsburg filed an opinion dissenting in part and dissenting from the judgment. She agreed with the majority's interpretation of the FDCPA statute of limitations, but asserted that the fraudulent actions alleged in the complaint should warrant the application of the discovery rule, starting the statute of limitations on the date that he learned of the default judgment (in 2014). She considers this fraud-based discovery rule distinct from the generic discovery rule rejected by the majority, and would apply it even in cases where the generic discovery rule does not apply. Ginsburg's opinion also challenges the claim that Rotkiske failed to preserve the fraud argument in his appeals.

=== Effect ===
This ruling upheld the 3rd Circuit's ruling against Rotkiske, and resolved a circuit split between the 3rd Circuit and the 4th and 9th Circuit Courts of Appeal.
