= Credit Corp Group =

Australian debt collection company

Credit Corp Group Limited
- Type: Public
- Traded as: ASX: CCP
- Industry: Financial services
- Founded: September 4, 2000
- Headquarters: Sydney, Australia
- Area served: Australia, New Zealand, United States
- Key people: Thomas Beregi (CEO), Eric Dodd (Chairman)
- Services: Consumer finance, debt collection, debt buyer
- Number of employees: 2,149 (2025)
- Subsidiaries: Baycorp (Aust) Pty Limited; Baycorp (NZ) Limited; Baycorp (WA) Pty Limited; Baycorp Collection Services Pty Limited; Baycorp Collection Services (Aust) Pty Limited; Baycorp Collections PDL (Australia) Pty Limited; Car Start Pty Limited; Certus Partners Pty Limited; CLH Legal Group Pty Ltd; Collection House Limited; Credit Corp Acceptance Pty Limited; Credit Corp Australia Pty Limited; Credit Corp Collections Pty Limited; Credit Corp Financial Services Pty Limited; Credit Corp Lending Pty Limited; Credit Corp Receivables Pty Limited; Credit Corp Recoveries Pty Limited; Credit Corp Services Pty Limited; Hudson Legal Pty Ltd; Lion Finance Pty Ltd; Midstate Creditcollect Pty Ltd; National Credit Management Limited; Personal Insolvency Management Pty Limited; ThinkMe Finance Pty Ltd; Valute Pty Limited
- Website: creditcorp.com.au ccfs.com.au

Credit Corp Group is an Australian debt collector and debt buying company. The company purchases and collects debts in Australia, New Zealand, and the United States (US).

The business purchases consumer and small business debt from Australian, New Zealand and US banks, finance companies, telecommunication and utility companies. Through its subsidiary Credit Corp Financial Services Pty Limited, Credit Corp offers online consumer finance.

Its brands include Wallet Wizard, Car Start, Clear Cash, Resolvr and Wizpay.

== History ==
Credit Corp Group Limited was founded and has been listed on the Australian Securities Exchange since 2000.
