= CAMCO =

CAMCO or Camco may refer to:

- Camco, Tibet
- Central Aircraft Manufacturing Company, a defunct aircraft manufacturer
- Capital Acquisitions and Management Corporation, a defunct debt collection company
- General Electric’s Canadian appliance manufacturing company in Toronto, Ontario
- Camco Drum Company, a defunct drum company
- The nickname for Camden County (disambiguation)
