= Debt validation =

Right to challenge or receive verification of a debt

Debt validation, or "debt verification", refers to a consumer's right to challenge a debt and/or receive written verification of a debt from a debt collector. The right to dispute the debt and receive validation are part of the consumer's rights under the United States Federal Fair Debt Collection Practices Act (FDCPA) and are set out in §809 of that act, which has been codified in Title 15, Section 1692-1692p of the United States Code. This debt validation procedure was expected to reduce the incidence of debt collectors dunning the wrong person or attempting to collect previously paid debts.

== Persons or entities considered debt collectors ==
Under the Fair Debt Collection Practices Act, any person or entity, including lawyers, who regularly attempts to collect consumer debts is considered a debt collector and is therefore required to respond to proper debt validation requests. In contrast, the original creditor and its employees are generally not subject to the FDCPA, though they may be regulated by other state and federal laws; including the Fair Credit Reporting Act, which was modified by the Fair and Accurate Credit Transactions Act in 2003. The original Act excluded lawyers from the definition of "debt collector" by explicitly exempting from any coverage “any attorney-at-law collecting a debt as an attorney on behalf of and in the name of a client.” The definition of "debt collector" was amended in 1986 to omit the prior exemption for attorneys. Despite the amendment, some attorneys maintained that litigation in an attempt to collect a debt did not bring them within the definition of "debt collector" in 15 U.S.C. § 1692a(6). This issue was not resolved until 1995, when the Supreme Court determined that the FDCPA applies to any attorneys who regularly engage in debt collection activity, even if it includes litigation.

== Time limits for disputing a debt or requesting validation ==
A consumer can dispute all or any part of a debt at any time, but only a written request sent within thirty days of receipt of the first written notice of the debt triggers validation rights under the FDCPA. 15 U.S.C. § 1692g(a) requires specific information regarding the consumer's right to dispute all or part of the debt to be provided in writing to the consumer within 5 days of the initial communication. 15 U.S.C. § 1692g(b) specifies the response required of a debt collector upon receipt of a timely written or oral dispute, most notably that it shall cease collection of the debt until the collector mails the consumer "verification of the debt or a copy of a judgment, or the name and address of the original creditor, and a copy of such verification or judgment, or name and address of the original creditor."

Thus, there is no time limit for providing the required verification or other information, just that the collector must cease collection until it provides the required information. 15 U.S.C. § 1692g(b) also contains a prohibition against the collection activities and communications during the initial 30 days of contact with the consumer overshadowing or being inconsistent with the consumer's right to dispute the debt or request the name and address of the original. 15 U.S.C. § 1692g(c) provides that failure by the consumer to dispute the debt during the thirty-day period after the debt collector's initial communication with the consumer may not be construed by any court as an admission by the consumer that he is liable for the debt.

== Difficulty in defining what constitutes debt validation ==
The FDCPA does not define what constitutes proper debt validation, and the issue has not been fully resolved by the courts. In the leading case of Chaudhry v. Gallerizzo, the Fourth Circuit Court of Appeals adopted a relatively low standard: "Verification of a debt involves nothing more than the debt collector confirming in writing that the amount being demanded is what the creditor is claiming is owed; the debt collector is not required to keep detailed files of the alleged debt." The Court further stated that a request for validation of the debt is primarily intended to eliminate such problems as collectors contacting the wrong person or attempting to collect debts which have already been paid. In 2006, the Ninth Circuit Court of Appeals followed and adopted what they described as the "reasonable standard" articulated in Chaudhry.

Consumer advocates have criticized the Chaudhry and Clark cases as setting too low a legal standard for validation and allowing debt collectors to justify providing little information in response to a dispute. In addition, some courts (such as the Court of Appeals of Indiana) have taken a stricter stance on debt validation than the Chuadhry Court, though the precedential value of such cases is uncertain.

== Consequences of debt collector not responding ==
There is no deadline for the debt collector to provide a response to the request for validation. However, a debt collector must cease all attempts to collect the debt until they have sent a sufficient response.

If a consumer makes a timely request for debt validation and a debt collector fails to provide proper validation or does not respond at all, the debt collector may not legally continue to pursue the debt. If collection activity continues, the consumer may file a lawsuit in state or federal court for violation of the FDCPA (see Fair Debt Collection Practices Act for discussion of FDCPA lawsuits).

Any dispute of the debt must also be reported by the creditor on the consumer's credit report pursuant to the Fair Credit Reporting Act (FCRA).

== See also ==
- Fair Debt Collection Practices Act
- Fair Credit Reporting Act
- Adverse Credit History
- Credit card
- Credit rating agency
- Credit history
