= Dunning (process) =

Reminding a customer to pay

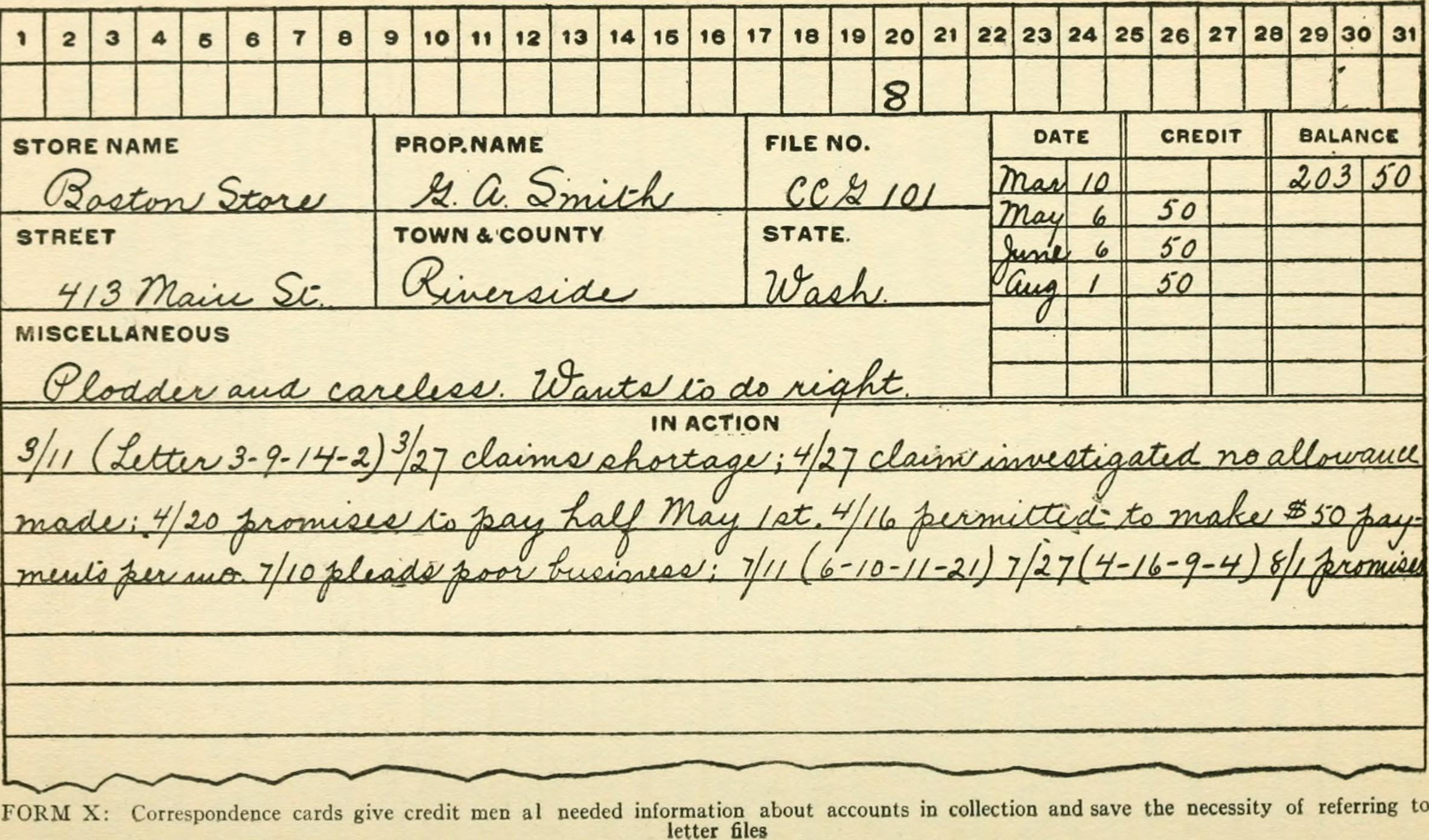
Sample dunning record, from a 1913 business manual.

Dunning is the process of methodically communicating with customers to ensure the collection of accounts receivable. Communications progress from gentle reminders to threatening letters and phone calls and more or less intimidating location visits as accounts become more overdue. Laws in each country regulate the form that dunning can take. It is generally unlawful to harass or threaten consumers. It is acceptable to issue firm reminders and to take all allowable collection options.

The word stems from the 17th-century verb dun, meaning to demand payment of a debt.

== See also ==
- Collection agency
- Consumer Credit Protection Act
- FDCPA, the Fair Debt Collection Practices Act
