= Norris v. Moskin Stores, Inc. =

1961 Alabama Supreme Court judgement

- Court: Alabama Supreme Court
- Full case name: Nealus E. Norris v. Moskin Stores, Inc. et al.
- Citation: 272 Ala. 174; 132 So. 2d 321; 1961 Ala. LEXIS 470

Court membership
- Judges sitting: Stately; Livingston; Lawson; Merrill

Case opinions
- Decision by: Stately

Norris v. Moskin Stores, Inc., 132 So. 2d 321 (Sup. Ct. Ala. 1961), is a decision by the Alabama Supreme Court, influential in the development of privacy law and state debt collection common law.

== The Case ==
Nealus Norris (plaintiff) sued Moskin Stores (defendant employer) and Morris Nathan (defendant employee) for invasion of privacy, intentional interference with marital relations, and slander (later stricken.) As part of their debt collection strategy, defendants had called plaintiff's wife and sister-in-law, pretending to be "Dorris" who had an affair with the plaintiff and was now pregnant. As a result, the plaintiff's wife separated temporarily and their marriage was strained until the truth came out. The defendants moved for a demurrer which was granted by the court and the lawsuit dismissed. Norris appealed. The Supreme Court of Alabama held that where a jury could find a debt collector's conduct to be outrageous and humiliating to a person of ordinary sensibilities, there is a prima facie case for invasion of privacy. Since Norris raised a sufficient question of fact concerning the defendant's collection conduct to state a prima facie claim for invasion of privacy, dismissal by the trial court was improper.

== The Decision ==
The court reasoned that "mere efforts of a creditor... to collect a debt cannot without more be considered a wrongful and actionable intrusion", however, there is only a right to take "reasonable action" to collect a debt. What constitutes "reasonable action" is a fact dependent inquiry. The court looked to three factors:

- Was there systematic harassment?
- Was there humiliating publicity?
- Was there a reasonable relation nexus between the action taken and the collection of the debt?(the court found this factor missing in this case)

In short, there is a valid cause of action for invasion of privacy when creditors intrusive conduct is inherently unreasonable, or fails to bear a reasonable relation to the goal of collecting the debt owed.

== Notes ==
Whaley, Douglas (2009). Problems and Materials on Consumer Law (5th Ed.). New York: Aspen Publishers. ISBN 978-0-7355-7711-4
