= Valid when made =

Valid when made (also sometimes valid-when-made) is a United States legal doctrine that holds that the terms of a loan, if legally valid when the loan was made, remain valid after the loan is sold or assigned to a third party. Historically, the doctrine has often been applied to loans made by national banks and then transferred to secondary lenders. Under this doctrine, debt buyers may purchase loans from national banks and collect interest at the same rate as the original lender, regardless of the usury laws of the state they operate in.

The doctrine entered common law during the 19th century and was codified in a final rule by the Office of the Comptroller of the Currency in 2020.

== History ==
The valid-when-made doctrine is believed to have originated with Nichols v. Fearson, an 1833 case, which found that "a contract, which, in its inception, is unaffected by usury can never be invalidated by any subsequent usurious transaction." The doctrine became a part of common law after the National Bank Act was passed in 1864. Among other things, the act maintained that national banks were only bound by the usury laws in their charter state, and not those of the home state of a borrower. Because of ambiguities in the language of the act, the courts generally treated the transfer of loans like the transfer of any other contract — allowing interest rates to remain fixed on loans as they were sold or transferred. Under this model, protection from out-of-state usury laws was transferred between lenders' along with the loan.

The valid-when-made doctrine was partly upheld in the landmark 1978 case Marquette National Bank of Minneapolis v. First of Omaha Service Corp. In Marquette v. Omaha, the Supreme Court ruled that a nationally chartered bank could offer loans at the maximum interest rate its charter state allowed, to consumers in any state, without being subject to another state's usury laws. This ruling led many large national banks to move to states that allowed them to charge high interest rates. After the ruling, courts generally held that debt buyers could collect interest at the originally set rate, despite not being subject to the same protections as national banks. This dynamic became a major component of the "rate exportation model" of lending, under which national banks sold or transferred loans.

=== Madden v. Midland Funding, LLC (2015–2019) ===
The case of Madden v. Midland Funding LLC in 2015 challenged the basic premise of the valid-when-made doctrine. Regarding Madden, the U.S. Court of Appeals for the Second Circuit ruled that Midland Funding, LLC, a third-party debt buyer, could be subject to state usury laws after purchasing a loan from Bank of America, a protected national bank. The Solicitor General of the United States submitted a brief that argued that the court's finding had been in error, stating that it was neither in keeping with the valid-when-made doctrine nor with the position of other circuit courts. However, in 2016 the Supreme Court denied Midland's request for certiorari (review), thereby affirming the lower court's decision.

The Madden ruling immediately caused widespread uncertainty about the ability of banks to sell or transfer loans to third parties. In particular, it was criticized for making it more difficult for high-risk, disadvantaged borrowers to obtain personal or business loans. The ruling also prompted concerns that loans that had previously been legally valid might become usurious, opening up secondary lenders to civil and criminal charges.

At the time of the decision, many legal and financial experts predicted that subsequent rulings would limit the scope of Madden; including the American Bankers Association who urged the creation of a "Madden fix" law to protect valid-when-made. Multiple bills were proposed to implement such a law, including the Protecting Consumers’ Access to Credit Act 2017, which was passed by the U.S. House Of Representatives. Opponents of the "Madden fix" laws argued that the valid-when-made doctrine violated states' rights.

=== OCC and FDIC decisions (2019–present) ===
In 2019, the Office of the Comptroller of the Currency (OCC) announced its intentions to re-enforce valid-when-made. The OCC clarified that the interest rate of loans can remain intact after being sold to a secondary lender. The Federal Deposit Insurance Corporation (FDIC) also reaffirmed and codified valid-when-made doctrine, arguing that Madden was a "deviation from longstanding notions of contract law" and had created market instability.

On May 29, 2020, the OCC issued a final rule that codified valid-when-made. The ruling was intended to address the legal ramifications of Madden and mitigate the damage to the secondary loan market. It stated that a loan that was not subject to the usury laws of a state at the time of creation cannot later become subject to them after being sold, transferred, or assigned.

The states of California, Illinois, and New York challenged the decision, contending that the OCC had not considered the consequences of its ruling. This challenge was rejected by the U.S. District Court for the Northern District of California, which ruled in favor of the OCC on February 8, 2022.

== See also ==
- Assignment (law)
