= Bad Paper (book) =

2014 book

- Author: Jake Halpern
- Publisher: Farrar, Straus and Giroux
- Publication date: 2014

Bad Paper: Chasing Debt from Wall Street to the Underworld is a 2014 nonfiction book by Jake Halpern. The book explores the debt buying and debt collection industry in the United States. It focuses on two debt collectors, former Bank of America wealth manager Aaron Siegel and his associate Brandon Wilson, a former bank robber.

== Reception ==
Kirkus Reviews wrote that "Halpern’s story of the debt collection world is also a dramatic rise-and-fall tale that traces the anything-goes heyday of debt collecting businesses in the unregulated early 2000s and how it has changed with the consequential recent Obama-era crackdowns on the shadier practices in the field." Writing for The Minnesota Star Tribune, Stephen J. Lyons described the book as "a seamlessly told page-turner that takes readers through the world of debt chasing, a world where there are no hard-and-fast rules, and where fortunes can be made through guile and street hustle."

Colin Dwyer of NPR gave the book a mixed review, writing that "Halpern struggles to decide what exactly he'd like his book to be — splitting his weight between a character study and a straight-up expose — before finally abandoning the narrative in order to just follow where the debt leads. Despite his attempts to ease these transitions, they remain abrupt, a strain on the thread holding the book's jumble of anecdotes and set pieces together."
