= ACA International =

Trade group formerly called American Collectors Association

- Established: 1939; 87 years ago
- Type: Trade association
- Legal status: Not-for-profit organisation
- Location: Eagan, Minnesota, United States
- Region served: Worldwide
- Services: Advocacy for the industry, members handbook and code of conduct
- Official language: English
- President: Jeff DiMatteo
- Funding: Membership fees
- Website: www.acainternational.org
- Formerly called: American Collectors Association

ACA International is a trade group located in the United States representing debt collection agencies, creditors, debt buyers, collection attorneys, and debt collection industry service providers.

ACA International is based in Minneapolis and Washington, D.C. with members located throughout the U.S. and more than 25 other countries. The organization, through its members, represents more than 150,000 industry employees.

== History ==
In June 1939, the Pacific Coast Association of Collection Agencies and California Association of Collectors held a joint convention in Oakland, California and launched the American Collectors Association with 273 members. The organization changed its name to ACA International in 2001.

== Industry overview ==
Collection agencies provide services to their clients include billing, customer service, insurance verification, training, data clearinghouse services, and debt purchasing.

In 2018, third-party collection agencies returned $90.1 billion to creditors, according to an economic impact survey conducted by Ernst & Young. These agencies help employ more than 124,000 employees with a payroll of $5 billion. In addition, third-party collection agencies contributed more than $108.3 million to charitable organizations and volunteered more than 524,000 hours in 2018—including 229,800 hours for company-sponsored activities.

As the trade association representing these businesses, ACA International lobbies for public policy favorable to its members, provides training and credentialing resources, establishes ethical standards and promotes the value of the industry to businesses, policymakers and consumers.

== Code of conduct ==
ACA International members are committed to ethical practices and take the expectations of creditor clients, fellow association members, and members of the public seriously. As a condition of association membership, all ACA members agree to abide by the ACA Code of Conduct and agree that any reports of noncompliance will be handled in accordance with the Association’s Ethics Committee Rules.
