= Forensic corporate collections =

Forensic Corporate Collections refer to the type of debt collection and recovery tactics that apply computer forensics and scientific knowledge to the debt collection process.

== Process ==
By engaging consistently updated computer software in the debt collection process, forensic corporate collection agencies are able to identify, retrieve, and protect electronic evidence of fraud (and other illegal means of avoiding debt) found on computers and use it as evidence in case of litigation. In order for a forensic collections agency to be used as a means of recovering a debt, the agency must be compliant with and knowledgeable of investigation basics, federal, state and local policies, standards, laws and legal processes. They must also have a working knowledge of the types of crimes and incidents in debt deception and fraud, the computing environment and types of evidence, as well as investigative tools, technical training, and use of forensic recovery equipment.

In order to effectively recover and locate debtors and get them to pay what they owe their client(s), forensic collections agents have become adept and conversant in evidence collection and management, managing the incident scene, the investigation of computer systems, disks, and file structures, extracting and preserving computer and electronic evidence, e-mail and Internet investigations, cell phone and PDA investigations, and other digital footprints debtors invariably leave behind.
