= Henson v. Santander Consumer USA Inc. =

Henson et al. v. Santander Consumer USA Inc.
- Supreme Court of the United States

Argued April 18, 2017 Decided June 12, 2017
- Full case name: Ricky Henson, et al., petitioners v. Santander Consumer USA Inc.
- Docket no.: 16-349
- Citations: 582 U.S. 79 (more) 137 S. Ct. 1718; 198 L. Ed. 2d 177
- Argument: Oral argument

Case history
- Prior: 817 F.3d 131 (4th Cir. 2016); cert. granted, 137 S. Ct. 810 (2017).

Holding
- A company may collect debts that it purchased for its own account without triggering the statutory definition of "debt collector." Fourth Circuit affirmed.

Court membership
- Chief Justice John Roberts Associate Justices Anthony Kennedy · Clarence Thomas; Ruth Bader Ginsburg · Stephen Breyer; Samuel Alito · Sonia Sotomayor; Elena Kagan · Neil Gorsuch

Case opinion
- Majority: Gorsuch, joined by unanimous

Laws applied
- Fair Debt Collection Practices Act

Henson v. Santander Consumer USA Inc., 582 U.S. 79 (2017), is a decision by the Supreme Court of the United States which held that a company is not a "debt collector" under the Fair Debt Collection Practices Act (FDCPA) if it purchased that debt and then attempts to collect from the debtor. It was Justice Neil Gorsuch's first written opinion since joining the Court in April 2017.

== Background ==
CitiFinancial loaned money to several individuals seeking to purchase automobiles. When the loans went unpaid, CitiFinancial repossessed and sold them to Santander Consumer USA, and told the individuals they owed the difference between the purchase price and the amount of money for which CitiFinancial sold the debt. Santander attempted to collect the debts. A suit was brought against Santander alleging a violation of the FDCPA. Santander claimed it was not a "debt collector" under the terms of the act because it was seeking to collect on debts that it had purchased, rather than attempting to collect as a third-party. The District Court and Fourth Circuit ruled in Santander's favor.

The Court considered whether a company that regularly attempts to collect debts it purchased after the debts had fallen into default is a "debt collector" subject to the FDCPA.

== Opinion of the Court ==
Justice Neil Gorsuch, writing his first opinion, ruled against the borrowers, holding that Santander in this case is not a debt collector under the FDCPA. When the act was enacted, regulations were put on institutions that collected other companies' debts, but the act left unaddressed businesses collecting their own debts. Gorsuch hinted that Congress could revisit the law, writing, "[i]t's hardly unknown for new business models to emerge in response to regulation, and for regulation in turn to address new business models. Constant competition between constable and quarry, regulator and regulated, can come as no surprise in our changing world. But neither should the proper role of the judiciary in that process — to apply, not amend, the work of the People’s representatives."

== See also ==
- List of United States Supreme Court cases, volume 582
- List of United States Supreme Court cases
- Lists of United States Supreme Court cases by volume
- List of United States Supreme Court cases by the Roberts Court
