= Capital Acquisitions and Management Corporation =

United States debt collection agency

- Company type: Private
- Industry: Debt collection
- Defunct: December 2004
- Fate: Shut down by court order; placed in receivership
- Headquarters: Rockford, Illinois, United States
- Key people: Reese Waugh, Jerome Kuebler, Eric Woldoff, George Othon, Jeffrey Garrington, David Kapp, Joshua Rausch, Michael Seng, Billy Martin
- Parent: Risk Management Financial Services, Inc.

Capital Acquisitions and Management Corporation (CAMCO) was a United States debt collection agency and subsidiary of Risk Management Financial Services, Inc., that was fined and closed down for repeated violations of the Fair Debt Collection Practices Act (FDCPA). Its closure marked the first time a Federal Trade Commission investigation shut down a collection company.

== Business model ==
CAMCO was a debt buyer, a type of company that purchases delinquent consumer debts from original creditors or other debt buyers. The company specialized in acquiring long-overdue accounts receivable - often more than a decade old - that were well beyond the statute of limitations for legal enforcement. Because these debts were essentially uncollectible through the courts, CAMCO purchased them for fractions of a penny on the dollar.

According to the FTC, many of the debts CAMCO sought to collect were time-barred, meaning they could no longer be enforced through litigation, and were also beyond the reporting period permitted under the Fair Credit Reporting Act. Some debts had already been discharged in bankruptcy or had previously been paid in full.

Notwithstanding the agreement, complaints of violations from consumers continued. Accordingly, on 3 December 2004, the FTC obtained an injunction against CAMCO and its owners and froze their assets. CAMCO headquarters were shut down by local police officers and representatives from the Federal Trade Commission and the company ceased functioning.

The company was put into receivership and was forced to sell the consumer debts it had bought for collection. On January 19, 2005, the debts were sold at a public auction in New York to another debt buyer.

On 30 November 2006, CAMCO and the Federal Trade Commission entered into a stipulated settlement Order whereby CAMCO, its owners and its affiliated companies agreed to pay an additional $1 million penalty and to a permanent ban from engaging in any debt collection activity.

== External links and references ==
- March 2004 FTC Complaint
- March 2004 Consent Decree
- December 2004 injunction and asset freeze Order
- ABC news article
- FTC Report on 2006 agreement and fine
