= Sewer service =

Fraudulent claim that a court process has been served properly

Sewer service is an epithet for the intentional failure to provide service of process on a named party in a lawsuit, in order to prevent the party from having a chance to respond. This practice usually involves filing a false affidavit claiming that the defendant had been properly served court papers; then, when the defendant fails to appear, the plaintiff then applies for and wins a default judgment due to the defendant's non-appearance. The phrase refers to the figure of speech of throwing the documents into a sewer, and is considered a fraud upon the court.

It was referenced in a 2019 United States Supreme Court opinion, Rotkiske v. Klemm, which featured an allegation of a debt collector winning a default judgment against a debtor through sewer service.
