= PRA Group =

Publicly-traded debt buyer and debt collection company

PRA Group, Inc.
- Formerly: Portfolio Recovery Associates, LLC 1996–; Portfolio Recovery Associates, Inc. –2014
- Traded as: Nasdaq: PRAA
- Founded: March 1996; 30 years ago (as Portfolio Recovery Associates, LLC ) Norfolk, Virginia, U.S.
- Headquarters: Norfolk, Virginia, United States
- Key people: Vikram Atal (President and CEO)
- Number of employees: 3,277
- Subsidiaries: Anchor Receivables Management; RDS
- Website: pragroup.com

PRA Group, Inc. is a publicly traded debt buyer and debt collection company based in Norfolk, Virginia. The company buys delinquent consumer debt from credit card issuers and other financial institutions at a discount and pursues collection of the full debt owed. Founded in 1996, PRA Group employs more than 3200 people in 18 countries.

Portfolio Recovery Associates has been sued and fined by entities including the Consumer Financial Protection Bureau and the Attorney General of New York for illegal debt collection tactics, threatening and misleading consumers, consumer reporting violations, and malicious prosecution.

== History ==
PRA Group was founded as Portfolio Recovery Associates, LLC in March 1996 by Kevin Stevenson and Steve Fredrickson, who worked previously in collections at Household Finance. With a staff of four in Norfolk, Virginia, the company began to purchase debt in May 1996. In 2000, PRA purchased $1 billion of debt. Then operating as Portfolio Recovery Associates Inc., it was ranked as the tenth largest debt buyer in the United States.

In 2000, the company established a call center in Hutchinson, Kansas. 75 bill collectors worked from the Hutchinson call center in 2001. The main call center, which employed 380 collectors and supervisors, was located in the Riverside Commerce Center in Virginia Beach, Virginia.

In 2002, about 50% of the company's debt portfolio had come from major credit card issuers including Visa, MasterCard and Discover. The portfolio had a value of $4.7 billion, based on money owed by 1.5 million individual debtors. In 2002, PRA had 590 employees across all sites and divisions.

PRA went public on November 8, 2002. Its IPO raised $50.7 million through the sale of 3.9 million shares of its stock at $13./share. By February 2003, it was trading at 60% above its $13 offering price. A second stock offering in May 2003 consisted largely of sales by insiders; the cofounders of PRA and an officer of the company collectively cleared $12.2 million from the offering.

In April 2010, PRA secured a controlling interest in the company Claims Compensation Bureau, which specialized in "recovering funds and processing payments owed under class-action settlements".

In 2013 PRA was listed in the Federal Trade Commission's report on the debt buying industry as one of the top five debt buyers in the US. Based on SEC filings, PRA's revenue for 2017 was $813 million. In October 2014, the company name was changed from Portfolio Recovery Associates, Inc. to PRA Group, Inc.

In 2015 PRA Group acquired Aktiv Kapital, a Norway-based debt buyer and lender in Europe and Canada. In 2020, the company expanded into Australia.

== Litigation and regulatory actions ==
In 2014, the Attorney General of New York obtained a settlement against PRA "for repeatedly bringing improper debt collection actions against New York consumers." The case involved uncontested default judgments levied against defendants who failed to respond to suits brought by PRA against them. The settlement required the abandonment of claims against debtors, changes in collection practices, and a civil fine.

In May 2015, a jury ordered Portfolio Recovery Associates to pay $82,990,000 in punitive damages for the malicious prosecution of Maria Guadalupe Mejia, a Kansas City woman who was pursued by PRA for a $1000 credit card debt she did not owe. The company was also fined $250,000 for violating the Fair Debt and Collection Practices Act.

In September 2015, The Consumer Financial Protection Bureau (CFPB) ordered PRA to pay an $8m penalty and issue $19 million in consumer refunds. The company was also ordered to cease collection attempts on debt totaling more than $3 million. The CFPB found that PRA:

- Threatened and deceived consumers to collect on inaccurate debts;
- Stated incorrect balances, interest rates, and payment due dates in attempting to collect debts from consumers;
- Failed to provide documentation on debts;
- Filed court cases without documentation to mislead consumers, and collected default judgments when consumers failed to appear in court;
- Filed cases on debts that they knew were outside the statute of limitations.

A 2019 court case between PRA Group's UK subsidiary and a debtor – Doyle vs PRA Group (UK) Ltd – clarified UK law around statute-barred debt, with the judge ruling that creditors were unable to pursue a debt if no action had been taken within six years of the initial default.

In March 2023, PRA was fined $24 million for continued illegal debt collection practices and consumer reporting violations. The director of the agency stated that following the 2015 action, PRA continued "violating the law through intimidation, deception, and illegal debt collection tactics and lawsuits."

In 2024, PRA paid $5.5 million to settle a class action lawsuit that alleged the company violated North Carolina debt collection law by obtaining default judgments against debtors without filing sufficient evidence to substantiate the debts claimed to be owed.

== Subsidiaries ==
PRA Group's subsidiaries include Portfolio Recovery Associates, LLC, which purchases and collects debt; PRA Receivables Management, LLC, which acquires and services bankrupt and insolvent accounts; PRA Location Services, which helps auto lenders and insurance companies recover missing collateral; and Claims Compensation Bureau (CCB), which monitors and files class action claims on behalf of institutional investors and corporate clients.
