= Camden County =

Camden County can refer to:

- Camden County, New Jersey, United States (the most populous county with the name)
- Camden County, North Carolina, United States
- Camden County, Missouri, United States
- Camden County, Georgia, United States
- Camden County, New South Wales, Australia
- Camden County, the fictitious setting of the television series My Name Is Earl
