= Default judgment =

Legal judgment

Default judgment is a binding judgment in favor of either party based on some failure to take action by the other party. Most often, it is a judgment in favor of a plaintiff when the defendant has not responded to a summons or has failed to appear before a court of law. The failure to take action is the default. The default judgment is the relief requested in the party's original petition.

Default can be compared to a forfeit victory in sports. In a civil trial involving damages, a default judgment will enter the amount of damages pleaded in the original complaint. If proof of damages is required, the court may schedule another hearing on that issue. A party can have a default judgment vacated, or set aside, by filing a motion, after the judgment is entered, by showing of a proper excuse.

== Specific jurisdictions ==
=== China ===
The concept of default judgement appears in ancient China, including in Zheng Xuan's 2nd century CE commentary on the Rites of Zhou. Regarding a requirement mentioned in the Rites of Zhou for disputants to bring a bundle of arrows to court, Zheng says that "Failure either to appear in court or to present a bundle of arrows should be tantamount to admission that one lacks a straight account of the facts."

In modern China, default judgements are generally enforceable (subject to relevant treaties and Supreme People's Court interpretations for foreign judgements) if it can be demonstrated that process was served.

=== England and Wales ===
==== How judgment arises ====
In England and Wales, a claimant starts a case by issuing a claim form. This either states a monetary figure on it, together with fixed costs and court fees; alternatively if the amount cannot be determined, it will be for an amount 'to be assessed'. A claimant may not wish to recover money at all, in which case the claim Form states this.

The claim form (together with other documents, known as particulars of claim and a response pack) are served on the defendant.

If the defendant fails to reply within 14 days of service, the claimant can apply for a judgment in default, either by simply requesting the court's administrative staff enter judgment filing a request for judgment (which is sufficient for routine cases), or by making a formal application to the procedural judge. The judgment is known as judgment in default of acknowledgement of service.

If the defendant acknowledged to the court that the papers were served within the 14-day period, then the defendant is given 28 days to take a further step. If the defendant fails to do so, again judgment can be entered as above; this time formally known as judgment in default of defense.

If money is claimed, the claimant can choose how their judgment will be phrased. Almost always there will be a request that the money claimed, the court fee, and interest at 8% on the money from when the claim form was issued up until date of judgment, and if legally represented a fixed contribution to legal costs, be ordered to be paid immediately. However, the claimant could simply request the defendant be ordered to pay at a later date or in installments.

If money is claimed but the amount is not fixed, a disposal hearing is listed to determine the amount of money.

If any other remedy is claimed, the claimant would have had to apply to the procedural judge for the judgment in default, and therefore the judge will determine what happens next.

Judgments in default are covered by Part 12 of the Civil Procedure Rules 1998.

==== Effect of judgment ====
The judgment is binding and failure to comply with it means that enforcement action could be taken.

The defendant's name is also entered onto a register (although if they pay within a month it will be removed) which is open to everyone, and is particularly used to vet the credit-worthiness of people.

In the case of Masters v Leaver it was held that a judgment in default means just that – it is a judgment obtained due to default. It does not mean that the court has agreed with what was claimed, or favors one or other case. Therefore, if the issue arises again, the defendant is not prevented from arguing the facts again.

==== Varying default judgment ====
If a defendant accepts the judgment, and the amount, but is unable to pay, the defendant may apply to vary the judgment. A process is gone through whereby the defendant states how soon they can afford to pay the debt (usually monthly installments) and the claimant can either accept this, or request another amount. The court's staff will suggest a figure and ultimately a district judge (N.B. In England and Wales a district judge is one of the lowest levels of judge) will make a decision. The decision is binding, even if it means the claimant is out of their money for a considerable amount of time, and even if interest cannot be charged on the outstanding sum (which it usually can not).

==== Setting aside default judgment ====
There are three grounds for canceling ('setting aside') the default judgment.

- The documents were not served correctly. The defendant has to show that the documents were not served, which would explain why the claimant had ability to enter judgment. This has to be done by way of an "application on notice" (motion). Evidence has to be shown to the procedural judge. This used to be called setting aside an "irregular judgment".
- There is some good reason why judgment in default should be set aside. This covers any situation but is commonly used when service was effected properly, but still did not come to the attention of the defendant (perhaps they were on a long vacation, or in hospital). Many jurisdictions also require the defendant to proffer a meritorious defense before vacating the default judgment.
- The claimant entered judgment when they were not entitled so to do. For example, perhaps a defense was filed in time, but the claimant still attempts to enter judgment. The court staff usually check for things like this, but occasionally things slip through the net. It used to be the obligation of the claimant to apply to set aside their own judgment in these circumstances, but this obligation was dropped in 2005.

In the last circumstance of the above, the defendant can get the judgment canceled as of right. Otherwise, the defendant needs to show what their defense will be, and if the court thinks that the defendant is effectively 'stalling for time' they will not get the judgment set aside.

==== Practice ====
In practice, an application to set aside default judgment is almost always granted. This fact is seized upon by so-called 'credit repair' companies. A person whose credit record is adversely affected by a registered judgment pays a credit repair company who advises them how to apply to have it set aside. This is usually of little effect: the judgment will be re-entered very quickly if there is no actual defense, and there are usually other records which affect a person's credit rating, not just the judgment.

Pragmatic reasons why judgments are set aside are mainly because on balance, it is seen as better to give a person who may have a good defense extra time, and avoid a potentially devastating judgment, and thereby keep a claimant out of their money for a further two to four weeks, than give the claimant the benefit.

However the court can, and often does, order conditions to be satisfied, such as a draft defense being filed first, money paid into court, or similar conditions.

Setting aside a judgment in default is covered by Part 13 of the Civil Procedure Rules.

=== United States ===
In the United States the law relating to a default judgment depends upon the jurisdiction within which the civil action was filed. State courts, United States Federal Courts, Tribal Courts and many Administrative Agencies have their own laws and local procedural rules relating to the granting and setting aside of a default judgment. The Federal Rules of Civil Procedure (Rules 55 and 60) are the basis for many procedures in default. Federal Rule 37(b)(iii) states that a plaintiff can be found in default and have his case dismissed if the plaintiff repeatedly fails to comply with things like court orders and discovery requests.

==== Entry of default ====
Typically, the plaintiff (or cross-complainant, cross-plaintiff, counter-claimant, counter-plaintiff, third-party plaintiff, etc.) must show that service of process was effected on the defendant (cross-defendant, counter-defendant, third-party defendant, etc.). This is typically achieved by the filing of an affidavit of service (also known as a proof of service), which gives enough information to allow the court to confirm that valid service has been accomplished. Typically the affidavit states, under oath or penalty of perjury, that service was effected on a named defendant, briefly describes how it was effected, names the person who made service, and gives the place and date service was effected. Once the requisite time to respond to the complaint has passed, the defendant is "in default"; this may be automatic, or it may require the court clerk to enter the default (which may, in turn, require that the plaintiff request entry of the default). Some defaults do not take effect until a set period of time after the clerk acts. The clerk may have to give the defendant notice of his default, affording a chance to have the default vacated.

The entry of a default typically prevents the defaulted defendant from litigating his case or presenting evidence, and may excuse the other parties from giving him notice of further proceedings.

==== Relief from default ====
A defaulted defendant may move the court from relief from his default, but usually must do so promptly and must provide "good cause" for his failure to answer the complaint in time. Often, part of the procedure for relief from default involves the defendant filing an answer to the complaint. The defendant relieved from default may also be required to pay any extra costs and fees incurred by the plaintiff as a result of the delay in the defendant's filing his answer.

==== Default judgment ====
Often, a certain additional time is required before a default judgment is permissible, and there may need to be additional notice to the defendant. Some states do not allow a default judgment to be entered against some defendants while other defendants are actively litigating the same case; this is an application of the "one final judgment" rule. Others will allow "several judgment" (judgment with respect to some defendants at one time, and with respect to others at another time), at least under some circumstances.

Title II of the Servicemembers Civil Relief Act significantly restricts default judgments against members of the military services. The law requires that before a default judgment may be entered, the plaintiff must make a certification as to the military service status of the defendant whose default is sought. This certification may be made in the complaint, in a document filed with the proof of service, or later. Depending on the circumstances, other requirements may also apply.

Some jurisdictions allow a clerk of court to enter default judgment in certain simple cases. These typically involve no exercise of judgment or discretion. Otherwise, a default judgment must be issued by a judge, who may require the plaintiff to present proof of his claims.

==== Relief from default judgment ====
A defendant who has had a default judgment entered against him may move for an order vacating the judgment. Such a defendant must show "good cause" for his not having responded to the complaint. However, "good cause" is rather easy to meet, compared to other instances where "good cause" might be required. For example, mere "excusable neglect" is, at least at the federal level, a sufficient reason to vacate default judgments. There are often time limits and other requirements.

Sewer service, where a default judgement is obtained by fraud by not properly notifying the defendant that they are being sued, may result in a motion to vacate the default judgement, a civil lawsuit against a dishonest plaintiff or process server, or criminal charges for swearing a false affidavit.

A court entertaining a motion to vacate a default judgment often considers the reasons presented the defendant's failure to respond (such as "excusable neglect" and the prejudice that might be suffered by the other party). The court must weigh these factors in light of two competing considerations: the general preference for cases to be decided "on the merits", and the important need for "finality in litigation."

== See also ==
- Judgment (law)
- European Enforcement Order
- Trial in absentia (criminal counterpart)
