= Fair debt collection =

Regulation of US debt collection at federal and state level

Fair debt collection broadly refers to regulation of the United States debt collection industry at both the federal and state level. At the Federal level, it is primarily governed by the Fair Debt Collection Practices Act (FDCPA). In addition, many U.S. states also have debt collection laws that regulate the credit and collection industry and give consumer debtors protection from abusive and deceptive practices. Many state laws track the language of the FDCPA, so that they are sometimes referred to as mini-FDCPAs.

Laws regulating telemarketing and phone solicitation can also apply to debt collection practices, including the Federal Telephone Consumer Protection Act of 1991 (TCPA).

== State regulation ==
U.S. state laws on fair debt collection generally fall into two categories: laws which require persons who are collecting debts from consumers to be licensed, registered or bonded in order to collect from consumers in their states, and laws that protect consumers from specific unfair practices by debt collectors, which may include collection agencies and sometimes original creditors. Unlike the FDCPA, many state laws also apply to the debt collection activity of original creditors, thus providing greater protections to consumers than the Federal FDCPA.

Although not all states have such laws, some states track violations of debt collection practices laws. Some states bar debt collectors from engaging in collection activity against residents of the state unless the collection agency has complied with state licensing or bonding requirements, while others exempt out-of-state collectors from those requirements. Many state fair debt collection laws provide for a private right of action (consumers can sue the debt collector) by consumers against debt collectors that violate their provisions.

Examples of prohibitions of unfair practices by collectors include contacting employers after having been given notice not to do so, pretending to be a government agency, pretending to be an attorney or falsely threatening a debtor with a lawsuit.

=== Collection laws ===
The following states have their own debt collection laws, which can be found here:

- Alabama: Ala. Code Sec. 40-12-80
- Alaska: Alaska Stat. Sec. 08.24.041-08.24.380; Alaska Stat. Sec. 45.50.471.
- Arizona: Ariz. Rev. Stat. Ann. sec. 32-1001 - 1057
- Arkansas: Ark. Stat. Ann. Sec. 17-24-101 -404
- California: Cal. Civ. Code Sec. 1788-1788.33, 1812.700 - .702
- Colorado: Colo. Rev. Stat. Sec. 5-1-101 - 5-12-105; Sec. 12-04-101 -137
- Connecticut: Conn. Gen Stat. Sec. 36a-645 - -647
- Delaware: Del. Code Ann. tit. 30, Sec. 2301(a)(12)
- Florida: Fla. Stat. Sec. 559.55-.785
- Georgia: Ga. Code. Ann. Sec. 7-3-1 -29
- Hawaii: Haw. Rev. Stat. Sec. 443B-1 -20; Sec. 480D-1 et seq.
- Idaho: Idaho Code Sec. 26-222 -2251
- Illinois: 225 Ill. Comp. Stat. 425/1 to /25
- Indiana: Ind. Code Ann.Sec. 25-11-1-1 to -13; Sec. 24-4.55-107
- Iowa: Iowa Code Ann. Sec. 537.7101 -.7103
- Kansas: Kan. Stat. Ann. Sec. 16a-5-107
- Kentucky: Ky. rev. Stat. ann. Sec. 24A-240 (re: CA in small claims ct)
- Louisiana: La.rev.Stat. Sec. 9:3576.1 -3576.24; Sec. 9:3557-9:3562
- Maine: Me.Rev.Stat.Amm. tit.32, Sec. 11001 - 11054; tit.9-A, Sec. 5-107, -116, -117, -201
- Maryland: Md.Ann.Code. Bus. Reg. Sec. 7-101 -502
- Massachusetts: Mass. Gen Laws Ann ch 93, Sec. 49
- Michigan: Mich. Comp. Laws Sec. 339.901 -.920; 445.251 - 445.258,
- Minnesota: Minn. Stat. Ann. Sec. 332.31 -.44
- Mississippi: Miss. Code Sec. 97-9-1
- Missouri: Mo. Rev. Stat. Chpt. 425
- Nebraska: Neb. Rev. Stat. Ann. Sec. 45-601 -622
- Nevada: Nev. Rev. Stat. Ann. Sec. 649.010 -.035
- New Hampshire: N.H. Rev. Stat. Chapster. 358-C
- New Jersey: N.J. Stat. Ann. Sec. 45:18 -6.1
- New Mexico: N.M. Stat.Ann. Sec. 61-18A
- New York: N.Y. Gen. Bus. Law Sec. 600-603,
- North Carolina: N.C. Gen.Stat. Chapter 58, Article 70; N.C. Gen. Stat. Chapter 75, Article 2.
- North Dakota: N.D. Cent. Code Sec. 13-05-01 -10
- Ohio: Ohio Rev. Code Ann. Sec. 1319.12
- Oklahoma: Okla. Stat. tit. 14A, Sec. 5-107
- Oregon: Or. Rev. Stat. Sec. 646.639 -.656; Sec, 697.005 -.095
- Pennsylvania: 18 Pa. Const. Stat. Ann. Sec. 7311; 73 Pa. Stat. Sec. 2270.1 -.6
- Rhode Island: R.I. Gen. Laws Sec. 19-14.9 -14.14
- South Carolina: S.C. Code Sec. 37-5-108
- Tennessee: Tenn. Code. Ann. Sec. 62-20-101 -126
- Texas: Tex. Fin. Code Sec. 392.001 -.404, 396.001 -.353
- Utah: Utah Code Ann. Sec. 12-1-1 -10; Sec. 70C-7-104 -106
- Vermont: Vt. Stat. Ann. tit 9, Sec. 2451a -2461
- Virginia: Va. Code. 18.1-213
- Washington: Wash. Rev. Code.Ann. Sec. 19.16.100 -.950
- Washington, D.C.: D.C. Code Ann. Sec. 22-3401 -3403; Sec. 28-3814 -3816; Sec. 28-3901 -3909
- West Virginia: W.Va. Code. Sec. 47-16-1 -5; Sec. 46A-2-122 -129a
- Wisconsin: Wis. Stat. Ann. Sec. 218.04; Sec. 427.101 -.105
- Wyoming: Wyo. Stat. Sec. 33-11-101 -116; Sec. 40-14-507

== See also ==
- Bank regulation in the United States
