= Consumer Credit Protection Act of 1968 =

Consumer Credit Protection Act
- Long title: An Act to safeguard the consumer in connection with the utilization of credit by requiring full disclosure of the terms and conditions of finance charges in credit transactions or in offers to extend credit; by restricting the garnishment of wages; and by creating the National Commission on Consumer Finance to study and make recommendations on the need for further regulation of the consumer finance industry; and for other purposes.
- Acronyms (colloquial): CCPA, TILA
- Nicknames: Truth in Lending Act
- Enacted by: the 90th United States Congress
- Effective: May 29, 1968

Citations
- Public law: 90-321
- Statutes at Large: 82 Stat. 146

Codification
- Titles amended: 15 U.S.C.: Commerce and Trade
- U.S.C. sections created: 15 U.S.C. ch. 41 § 1601

Legislative history
- Introduced in the Senate as S. 5 by William Proxmire (D–WI) on January 11, 1967; Committee consideration by Senate Banking Committee, House Committee on Banking and Currency; Passed the House on February 1, 1968 (383–4); Passed the Senate on July 11, 1967 (92–0) with amendment; House agreed to Senate amendment on May 22, 1968 (agreed) with further amendment; Senate agreed to House amendment on May 22, 1968 (agreed); Signed into law by President Lyndon B. Johnson on May 29, 1968

Major amendments
- Dodd–Frank Wall Street Reform and Consumer Protection Act; Economic Growth, Regulatory Relief and Consumer Protection Act

The Consumer Credit Protection Act (CCPA) is a United States law Pub. L. 90–321, 82 Stat. 146, enacted May 29, 1968, composed of several titles relating to consumer credit, mainly title I, the Truth in Lending Act, title II related to extortionate credit transactions, title III related to restrictions on wage garnishment, and title IV related to the National Commission on Consumer Finance.

The restrictions on wage garnishment guard employees from discharge by their employers because their wages have been garnished for any one indebtedness. The Wage and Hour Division of the United States Department of Labor enforces the provisions. The informed use of credit is administered by the United States Congress and stabilizes economic acts to be enhanced with competition informed unto various financial institutions that are engaged in extension of consumer credit that would be strengthened otherwise by informed credit use.

Titles:

- Truth in Lending Act
- Fair Credit Reporting Act
- Credit Repair Organizations Act
- Fair Debt Collection Practices Act
