= Debt buyer =

A debt buyer is a company, sometimes a collection agency, a private debt collection law firm, or a private investor, that purchases delinquent or charged-off debts from a creditor or lender for a percentage of the face value of the debt based on the potential collectibility of the accounts. The debt buyer can then collect on its own, utilize the services of a third-party collection agency, repackage and resell portions of the purchased portfolio, or use any combination of these options.

The Federal Trade Commission (FTC) administers the 1977 landmark federal Fair Debt Collection Practices Act (FDCPA), which established debt collection industry standards and depends on the industry self-regulating or "self-enforcing" the statute through "private action" as opposed to "government law enforcement". FDCPA protect consumers and ethical collectors.

From 1999 to 2009, the "advent and growth of debt buying", that is "the purchasing, collecting, and reselling of debts in default", was considered to be the "most significant change" in the debt collection business. According to Sacramento, California-based Debt Buyers Association (DBA), a debt buyers trade association, by 2008 there were "hundreds, and possibly thousands" of debt buyers. The debt buying industry was highly concentrated according to The Nilson Report with only ten debt buyers "responsible for 81 percent of all of the credit card debt purchased in fiscal year 2007".

DBA, which was established in 1997 and is now known as Receivables Management Association (RMA), provides the self-regulation tool for debt buyers, the International Receivables Management Certification Program, which has been obligatory for all RMA members since February 29, 2016.

In 2015, Encore Capital Group and subsidiaries form the largest debt buyer and collector in the United States and Portfolio Recovery Associates was the second largest.

According to the Federal Reserve Bank of New York's May 2017 Quarterly Report on Household Debt and Credit, Americans owe $12.73 trillion in consumer debt to creditors—credit card companies, student loans, mortgages, and car dealers, among others. These debts are usually paid off to creditors, but by 2017, unpaid debts were "increasingly likely to end up in the hands of professional debt collectors—companies whose business it is to collect debts that are owed to other companies". According to the annual CFPB 2017 report, there were 130,000 people employed by 6,000 collection agencies in the "$13.7 billion dollar industry".

== Role of debt buyers ==
Debt buyers include firms whose business model focuses on the purchase of debt, as well as collection agencies and collection law firms who collect both on debt owned by others as well as debt they purchase and own themselves. In addition, some firms are passive debt buyers—investors that buy and resell portfolios but do not engage in actual debt collection themselves.

— GAO September 2009

The debt collection industry which includes debt buyers, "in-house collection departments, third-party collection agencies, and collection attorneys", recover and return "billions of dollars in delinquent debt" to "card issuers and other creditors" annually which "increase[s] the availability of consumer credit and reduce[s] its cost". The "accounts receivable management industry" includes the "collection practices of original creditors". The GAO refers to the debt collection industry as "businesses that engage in the collection of debt for which the business is not the original creditor".

According to ACA International, previously known as American Collectors Association, a trade group representing "collection agencies, creditors, debt buyers, collection attorneys and debt collection industry service providers", the collections industry as a whole provided over 230,000 jobs nationwide in 2013.

== History ==
The debt buying industry in the United States began as a result of the savings and loan crisis (S&L crisis) in which from 1986 and 1995, 1,043 out of the 3,234 American savings and loan associations failed and hundreds of banks were closed by the Federal Savings and Loan Insurance Corporation (FSLIC) and the Resolution Trust Corporation (RTC). The Federal Deposit Insurance Corporation (FDIC), which insures deposits up to a certain amount, received the assets of the bank to cover the expenses associated with repaying the closed banks' depositors.

When the FDIC and eventually the Resolution Trust Corporation took control of the assets, they had to find institutions, organizations and private investors that would be willing to purchase the assets of closed banks including both performing and non-performing (delinquent or charged-off) accounts.

The RTC held auctions around the country allowing various organizations to bid for portfolios of mixed assets. At these auctions, the bidders were not able to evaluate the assets prior to bidding and most purchasers had no idea what they had purchased until they had left the auction. The availability of these assets to the general public was the fuel used to launch the debt buying industry.

DBA, a trade association for the debt buyer industry, was established in 1997.

Due to the profitability of the industry, debt buying experienced dramatic expansion from 2000 through 2005, doubling its debt acquisition in those years.

According to a 2004 Healthcare Financial Management web page, credit card debt comprises 70% of the accounts sold to debt buyers, followed by automobile loans, telecommunications debt, and retail accounts.

By 2005 the total of consumer loans had climbed to a new high of over $2 trillion, representing a 25% increase since 2000. On October 17, 2005, the Bankruptcy Abuse Prevention and Consumer Protection Act (BAPCPA) came into effect with more stringent bankruptcy laws making it more difficult for debtors to use the courts to be released from debt. According to the National Consumer Law Center (NCLC), these two factors contributed to the rapid growth of the debt buying industry. The increased debt load was further complicated by "rising interest rates and stagnant personal incomes". Other factors exacerbating a debt crisis included "identity theft and Internet fraud". BAPCPA "effectively repealed the fresh start principle for individuals".

Bankruptcy reform benefited "banks, credit card companies, and other creditors" who lobbied for the reform because they bear the loss when debts are discharged through bankruptcy. According to a 2009 article in Berkeley Business Law Journal, as a result of BAPCPA, "although bankruptcies and credit card company losses decreased, and credit card companies achieved record profits, the cost to consumers of credit card debt actually increased. In other words, the 2005 bankruptcy reforms profited credit card companies" and "increased the costs and decreased the benefits of bankruptcy to consumers". By 2007, the use of Chapter 11 as a debtor relief vehicle had eroded.

By 2005 debt buyers had purchased approximately $110 billion in face value of delinquent debts in 2005. According to SEC filings, by 2005, the largest debt buyers at that time purchased billions of dollars' worth of debt for pennies on the dollar. For example, Asset Acceptance purchased $4.2 billion of debt for $102.3 million which represented 2.4 cents on the dollar.

According to Christopher Palmeri, by 2005, the "$15-billion-a-year [debt buyer] industry" by 2005 had gone "corporate". In the third quarter of 2005 alone, "private-equity firms, venture capitalists, and others invested a record $1.6 billion in the business, almost as much as in all of [2004]. Six firms [were] publicly traded, and two made secondary share offerings [in 2005]."

According to a 2005 publication by the Association of Credit and Collection Professionals (ACA), by 2005, as the visibility and profitability of the industry grew, so did competition, both in terms of the number of debt buyers and the rising prices of bad debt.

A July 2006 article in The New York Times reported that the Federal Trade Commission received 66,627 complaints from consumers about "third-party debt collectors" in 2005 compared to 11,820 in 1999.

In 2007 the total outstanding credit card debt rose to over $838 billion and the delinquency rate on credit cards payments rose to its highest level in 18 years during the Great Recession in the United States. IN December 2007, the six largest credit card issuers were Citigroup Inc., Bank of America, JPMorgan Chase & Co., Capital One Financial Corp., Discover Financial Services Inc, and American Express, with a total credit card debt of $692,879,725,000.

In 2008, collectively, "nine of the largest debt buyers" purchased 76.1% of the total debt. Six of the largest debt buyers participated in a three-year FTC study providing some data related to 5,000 portfolios—mainly credit card debt—purchased for about $6.5 billion representing almost "90 million consumer accounts". The total face value of the accounts was approximately $143 billion.

As a result of the 2008 financial crisis, prices for the best accounts fell from the 2007–2008 high of 14 cents on the dollar to 4–7 cents. According to the Payments Source 2009 webpage, depending on the age and history of the debt, a buyer typically paid between 3 and 20 percent of the face value of the debt. Accounts that come directly from the original creditor without having been placed with a collection agency have the highest value, with prices decreasing based on the amount of time that has passed since the account was charged off.

With the passing of Dodd–Frank Wall Street Reform and Consumer Protection Act in 2010, debt buyer industry regulations were tightened. "Stymied in state courts, the debt buyers" began to file thousands of lawsuits in "bankruptcy courts – specifically, in cases governed by Chapter 13 of the Bankruptcy Code, which allows consumers earning regular incomes to restructure their debts and repay as many as they can over a period of several years."

== Professional associations ==
Association of Credit and Collection Professionals, (ACA) International
The Association of Credit and Collection Professionals, (ACA) International-an association was established in 1939 to represent "third-party collection agencies, law firms, asset buying companies, creditors and vendor affiliates" that "establishes ethical standards, produces a wide variety of products, services and publications, and articulates the value of the credit and collection industry to businesses, policymakers and consumers."
Receivables Management Association (RMA)
The Sacramento, California-based Receivables Management Association (RMA), formerly known as Debt Buyers Association, a nonprofit trade association, was established in 1997 and has a membership of 575 companies.

== Regulation ==
The federal landmark Fair Debt Collection Practices Act (FDCPA) of 1977 was "intended to be ... primarily a self-enforcing statute" in which "private action rather than government law enforcement" was the "main means of promoting industry compliance with the law". In 2010 the FDCPA was amended.

=== Federal regulations ===
Consumer third-party agencies are subject to FDCPA, which went into effect in March 1978 and is administered by the Federal Trade Commission (FTC) (15 USC 1692 et seq.) The FDCPA was intended to The FDCPA established standards for the debt collection industry intended "to protect consumers from harmful debt collection practices and to protect ethical collectors from competitive disadvantage". Thirty years after FDCPA was enacted, a workshop hosted by the FTC with "consumer groups, the collection industry, academia, and government agencies" participating, found that "most significant change in the debt collection business" [from 1997 to 2007], was the "advent and growth of debt buying (i.e., the purchasing, collecting, and reselling of debts in default)".

Under the FDCPA abusive debt collection practices, such as the following, are illegal:

- Filing lawsuits with no documentation showing that the debt was ever purchased or assigned to the plaintiff.
- Pursuing debts that are not actually owed by the person being targeted.
- Attempting to collect, improperly suing, or threatening to sue people on debts that are past the applicable statute of limitations or were settled and closed via bankruptcy.
- Reporting inaccurate creditor information to a credit bureau.
- Impersonating law enforcement and threatening to have a person arrested, or threatening to directly garnish a person's wages, seize their property, etc.
- Failing to validate debt in writing when requested.
- Continuing to call a person's place of employment when instructed not to.
- Ignoring cease-and-desist notices to stop telephoning and communicate only via mail.
- Verbally abusing, using obscene language, threatening and harassing consumers.

While original creditors are often exempt from fair debt collection laws, courts and regulators have generally taken the position that debt buyers and any other third-party collection agency are covered by these laws. A debt buyer does not have the same incentive to maintain the customer relationship with a debtor as the original creditor, and some debt buyers may be unconcerned about negative publicity and complaints. Thus, there are reports that some debt buyers engage in abusive debt collection practices, which are illegal under the Fair Debt Collection Practices Act.

Thus, debt buyers who engage in abusive collections practices are subject to lawsuits under the Fair Debt Collection Practices Act, the Fair Credit Reporting Act and other state and federal laws. They may also be subject to regulatory action by state attorneys general or the Federal Trade Commission, which in 2004 shut down Capital Acquisitions and Management Corporation, a debt buyer that allegedly engaged in extensive abusive collection practices.

To address many of the controversies surrounding debt buyers and to learn more about the business, the FTC in January 2010 asked nine of the largest debt purchasers in the country to submit detailed information about their businesses and the debt portfolios they have bought in the past.

Following FTC hearings on revisions to the FDCPA in October 2007, the Commission brought "unprecedented enforcement actions against large accounts receivable management (ARM) companies".

In their February 2009 report, the Commission raised concerns about consumer protection as related to "debt collection litigation and arbitration practices". These concerns were repeated in their 2010 report in which the Commission stated that system in place for "resolving consumer debts" was "broken". Consumers were "not adequately protected in either debt collection litigation or arbitration". The FTC recommended that the federal and state governments, and the debt collection industry, implement reforms to increase the efficiency and fairness of the system.

In January 2013, the FTC published their report entitled "The Structure and Practices of the Debt Buying Industry", which was the "first major empirical study of debt buyers".

In 2010 the Dodd–Frank Wall Street Reform and Consumer Protection Act was passed.

=== States ===
Many U.S. states have similar laws to the FDCPA on fair debt collection, called "mini-FDCPAs" by some. Many states' laws regulate the debt collection industry and give consumer debtors more extensive protection from abusive and deceptive practices.

The Debt Collection Law in Massachusetts was modeled after the FDCPA and uses the Commission's definitions of debt collector to include debt buyers. Massachusetts and the FDCPA dismissed arguments that "collections must be for 'another' or that a debt buyer is included within the definition of a 'creditor' and therefore as a 'creditor' would not be covered by the FDCPA. ... [However], a creditor does not include a person who received an assignment or transfer of a debt in default." Debt buyers are included in the definition: "any person who uses an instrumentality of interstate commerce or the mails in any business the principal purpose of which is the collection of a debt, or who regularly collects or attempts to collect, directly or indirectly, a debt owed or due or asserted to be owed or due another."

=== Municipal ===
New York City enacted a law in 2009 which "prohibiting debt collection agencies from collecting 'a debt on which the statute of limitations for initiating legal action has expired unless such agency first provides the consumer such information about the consumer's legal rights as the commissioner prescribes by rule.'"

=== Self-regulation ===
The International Receivables Management Certification Program which was established in 2013, became obligatory by February 29, 2016, for all "DBA International members in the Professional, Standard, and Associate membership categories".

The DBA International Receivables Management Certification Program was established in 2013 to certify companies and individuals operating and employed within the U.S. receivables industry. This "gold standard" certification program was designed to promote uniform, consumer-oriented, best practice standards for the receivables industry. The program is administered by DBA International. The program has established a national standard for the debt buying industry to ensure that certified companies are complying with state and federal statutory requirements, responding to consumer complaints and inquiries, and are following industry best practices. The program requires certified companies to conform to 20 standards ranging from data and document acquisition, chain of title, and data security to establishing consumer complaint and dispute resolution policies. Certified companies are subject to independent third-party audits as well as remediation agreements if they do not conform to the standards. Failure to comply with program requirements will lead to the loss of certification.

In their 2016 white paper, the RMA recommended a number of self-regulatory options such as the adoption of standardized industry best practices to ensure that secondary market sales transactions "preserve data and document integrity" about the sales transaction at the "point of the sales" to avoid the imposition of more governmental regulations. This includes the consumer's full name, address, Social Security number or other government issued identification number as well as copies of the contract, unpaid balance, "with a breakdown of the post-charge-off balance, interest, fees, payments, and creditor/owner authorized credits".

== Types of collection agencies ==
In 2005, debt buyers ranged in size from very small private businesses to multimillion-dollar publicly traded companies.

According to a 2005 article in The Washington Post, there were four publicly traded debt buyers.

Debt buyers may be classified as "active"—those who attempt to collect on the accounts they purchase, or "passive"—those who invest in the debt and then outsource the collection activities to a separate collection agency or collection law firm. Since Dodd–Frank, the "passive" debt buyer has all but become extinct.

In a 2005 article published in Business Credit journal, the author Paul Legrady distinguished between first, second and third-party collection agencies. First-party collection agencies tend to nurture more constructive relationships with the second-party (called consumers or debtors) and are involved in the early months before they selling or passing the debt on to a third-party. The first-party writes off most of the value of the debt in the sale to a third-party collection agency.

According to a 2005 article by Christopher Palmeri, the public relations risks to the first-party collection agency associated with defaulted debt collection are reduced by passing on the debt collection to the third-party collector. First-party creditors are outside companies hired by a creditor "to collect on accounts that are between 30 and 90 days past due but not yet charged off as losses by the creditor".

Due to the varying size of debt buying organizations, not all organizations have the capital required to purchase large portfolios directly from the debt issuer. Historically, smaller debt-buying firms would purchase their debt accounts from a larger buyer after that larger buyer had already attempted to collect on the account.

Purchased debts can also include personal loans, utility bills, medical bills, primary and secondary mortgages, or any type of consumer or commercial credit account.

Debt buying has historically taken place via the purchase and sale of whole portfolios consisting of a static group of accounts. Debt issuers usually prefer to sell their entire portfolio to a single debt buyer because the issuer is responsible for supplying the debt buyers with the documentation to prove the validity of the account. This documentation known as "media" in the debt buying industry may include the original account application, monthly statements, affidavits of sale and charge-off statements. This information protects consumers and is necessary to prove in court that the debtor owes the money and that the debt buyer owns the account.

Most of the major banks that sell all or a portion of their charged-off assets sell their accounts to a small selection of pre-approved buyers who purchase using a vehicle known as a "Forward Flow Agreement". A forward flow is an agreement between a debt buyer and debt seller to transact a fixed amount of debt over a fixed period of time for a predetermined price. For example, a debt buyer and debt seller may enter an agreement to transact $20 million face value of debt each month for 12 months at a price of 7%.

== Student loans ==
Since 2005, Navient acquired the portfolio of "private student loans, Direct Department of Education Loans, and student loans that originated under the Federal Family Education Loan (FFEL) Program" account receivables from Sallie Mae. By 2015 U.S. Department of Education had contracted out to various federal accounts receivable collectors, including "Navient-owned Pioneer Credit Recovery, as well as Coast Professional, Enterprise Recovery Systems, National Recoveries and West Asset Management", the management of the "$744.3 billion portfolio of direct student loans".

== Largest debt buyers ==
Debt buyers, such as Encore Capital Group and Portfolio Recovery Associates, the two largest debt buyers, purchase "portfolios of defaulted consumer receivables from major banks, credit unions, and utility providers". According to the Consumer Financial Protection Bureau, an official site of the United States government, they

purchase delinquent or charged-off accounts for a fraction of the value of the debt. Although they pay only pennies on the dollar for the debt, they may attempt to collect the full amount claimed by the original lender. [By 2015], these two companies have purchased the rights to collect over $200 billion in defaulted consumer debts on credit cards, phone bills, and other accounts.

— Consumer Financial Protection Bureau 2012

Encore Capital Group and subsidiaries form the largest debt buyer and collector in the United States. Encore Capital enjoyed soaring revenues from $316 million in 2009 to $773 million in 2013. The firm is a publicly traded NASDAQ Global Select company, a component stock of the Russell 2000, the S&P SmallCap 600, and the Wilshire 4500. Portfolio Recovery Associates was the second-largest in 2015.

NCO, previously the largest debt collector, was taken private in 2006 after merging with One Equity Partners.

The Receivable Management Services Corporation (RMS), a collection agency, is based in Bethlehem, Pennsylvania. In September 2005, Citigroup venture-capital funds purchased a controlling stake in RMS.

== Controversies ==
The FTC has undertaken investigations and published reports in 2007, 2009, 2010, and 2013 raising concerns about on . In 2007 the Commission brought actions against the largest debt buying companies for practices that ethical industry members also deplored. In her 2006 The Washington Post article, Pulitzer Prize-winning journalist Liz Pulliam Weston described some of the worst practices debt buyer industry attorneys had used. This included "badgering" consumers for debts already released through bankruptcy, lawsuits or threats of lawsuits over debts released because "the statute of limitations had expired", put pressure on consumers by claiming their "old debt" is a "new one", thereby "illegally 're-aging' debts on credit reports and extending the seven-year limit". They also make promises to delete a "negative mark from the consumer's credit report" if a payment is made without informing the consumer, that making even a token payment revives the statute of limitations. Credit card companies purchase charged-off debts and add them to the balance of 'bait-and-switch' credit cards that consumers unknowingly purchase because they are low-rate credit cards. Consumers also complained of being verbally abused, harassed, "cursed, berated and called repeatedly despite requests to stop".

At the corporate level the debt collection business model is highly lucrative as debt buyers purchase "huge swaths of soured bills from lenders for pennies on the dollar".

Jake Halpern, author of Bad Paper, described Encore Capital as a "behemoth" in the American debt-industry complex.

In September 2015, both Encore and Portfolio Recovery Associates were charged with violating the Fair Debt Collection Practices Act (FDCPA), the Dodd–Frank Wall Street Reform and Consumer Protection Act by filing "lawsuits against consumers without having the intent to prove many of the debts, winning the vast majority of the lawsuits by default when consumers failed to defend themselves". The U.S. federal Consumer Financial Protection Bureau imposed an enforcement action on Encore for pressuring borrowers "to pay with false statements, with lawsuits and with the use of using so-called robo-signed court documents," that was also used in mortgage processing in the subprime market. According to The New York Times, Encore must pay "$42 million in consumer refunds and a $10 million penalty" and an injunction to "stop collections on debts totaling more than $125 million".

=== Mass-produced lawsuits ===
According to the Consumer Financial Protection Bureau(CFPB) between 2009 and 2014 a debt collection agency, through its law firm, "mass-produced" "hundreds of thousands of lawsuits against consumers in New Jersey, New York, and Pennsylvania". Pressler & Pressler "used an automated claim-preparation system", "online database called AnyWho" and "non-attorney support staff" to "hunt for debtors" and to "determine which consumers to sue". The attorneys "spent less than a few minutes, sometimes less than 30 seconds, reviewing each case before initiating a lawsuit". By 2009, in New York City alone, collection agencies that had bought the debt for "pennies on the dollar from card issuers" issued high volumes of lawsuits in the city's civil court against debtors—approximately 1,000 cases a day.

Andrew Cuomo, who was Attorney General of New York from January 1, 2007, to December 31, 2010, had "shut down" two collection firms and sued "35 law firms tied to the business". Collection firms were fraudulently and sloppily "[c]onducting a digital dragnet" troll[ing] through "commercial databases searching for debtors".

In 2009, in a case before Judge Noach Dear in Brooklyn, T. Andy Wang, a lawyer with Pressler & Pressler revealed that Pressler & Pressler, "one of the biggest in the collection industry", used the "online database called AnyWho to hunt for debtors". They then summoned all those with the same name to court. Judge Dear called for a sanctions hearing, a formal process of penalizing Pressler & Pressler, for suing the wrong man without confirming the man's claims about his Social Security number and date of birth. Judge Dear also called for compensation for lost wages for the man wrongfully summoned and accused.

In cases where the wrongfully accused does not respond to the debt collector's "civil court summons—even if wrongly identified—faces a default judgment and frozen bank accounts". Until Judge Dear's case, there were "few penalties against collectors for dragging the wrong people into court".

In April 2016, Pressler and Pressler's two principal partners, Sheldon H. Pressler and Gerard J. Felt and "New Century Financial Services, Inc., a debt buyer", were ordered by the Consumer Financial Protection Bureau (CFPB) "to stop churning out unfair and deceptive debt collection lawsuits based on flimsy or nonexistent evidence". They were also barred from "illegal practices that can deceive or intimidate consumers, such as filing lawsuits without determining if debts in question are valid". The law firm, the partners themselves and the debt buyer were ordered to pay a total of $2.5 million in fines to the CFPB's Civil Penalty Fund. The respondents "violated the Fair Debt Collection Practices Act and the Dodd–Frank Wall Street Reform and Consumer Protection Act, which prohibits unfair and deceptive acts or practices in the consumer financial marketplace".

=== Student loans ===
On May 28, 2015, three defendants—Navient Solutions Inc. (formerly known as Sallie Mae, Inc.), and Navient DE Corporation (formerly known as SLM DE Corporation), and Sallie Mae Bank—were charged with violating the Service members Civil Relief Act (SCRA) from 2005 through 2015 by "failing to provide members of the military the 6 percent interest rate cap to which they were entitled for loans that were incurred before the military service began". The defendants had to pay $60 million in compensation to the nearly 78,000 military service members "who were forced to pay more for their student loans than is required under the SCRA". Navient was fined $55,000 as a civil penalty payable to the United States. Navient had to "request that all three major credit bureaus delete negative credit history entries caused by the interest rate overcharges and improper default judgments".

=== Supreme Court case ===
In an article of June 25, 2017, in The Washington Post, journalist Adam Winkler observed that there has been a shift in Supreme Court decisions towards favoring corporations like debt buyers. In a ruling on May 15, 2017, the Supreme Court found in favor of Midland Credit Management, Inc., a debt collection company, in the Johnson's Chapter 13 bankruptcy case. The Alabama Bankruptcy Court rejected Midland's lawsuit against Johnson for the credit card debt of $1,879.71, which was a "stale claim" as Johnson was under bankruptcy protection. Johnson then sued Midland, "seeking actual damages, statutory damages, attorney's fees, and costs for a violation" of the Fair Debt Collection Practices Act, claiming that its filing a proof of claim on an obviously time-barred debt was "false", "deceptive", "misleading", "unconscionable", and "unfair". The Court ruled against Johnson, finding that Midland's proof of claim did not violate Alabama law or the bankruptcy code, given the latter's broad definition of claims.

In their dissent, Justices Sotomayor, Ginsburg and Kagan wrote that "Professional debt collectors have built a business out of buying stale debt, filing claims in bankruptcy proceedings to collect it, and hoping that no one notices that the debt is too old to be enforced by the courts. This practice is both 'unfair' and 'unconscionable'. I respectfully dissent from the Court's conclusion to the contrary."

== See also ==
- Vulture fund
- Debt collection
- Distressed securities
