= Jake Halpern =

American writer and commentator (born 1975)

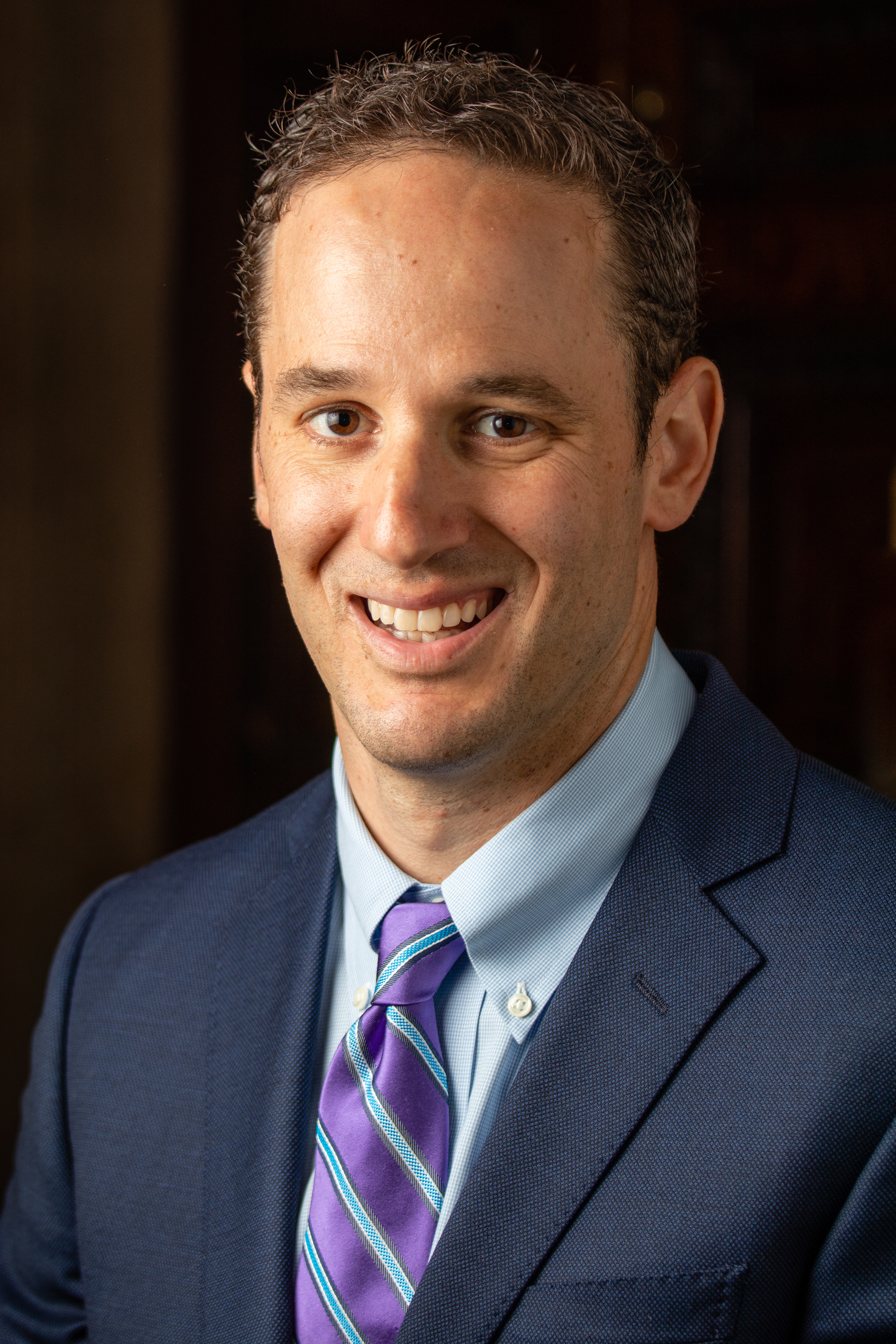
- Halpern at the 2018 Pulitzer Prizes
- Born: 1975; Buffalo
- Occupations: Journalist, radio pundit, editing staff, comics creator, university teacher, writer

Jake Halpern (born 1975) is an American writer, commentator, and podcast producer.

== Life and career ==
He was born in Buffalo, New York, where he attended City Honors School. Halpern later attended Yale University, where he received an undergraduate degree in 1997. He has written for The New York Times Magazine, The Wall Street Journal, The New Yorker, the New Republic, Entertainment Weekly, Slate, Smithsonian, GQ, Sports Illustrated, New York Magazine, and other publications.

Halpern is also a commentator and a freelance producer for National Public Radio's All Things Considered and a contributor to This American Life. Jake's hour-long radio story, "Switched at Birth," was selected by host Ira Glass as one of the eight stories that best represent This American Life to new listeners. His podcast, Deep Cover, was named one of the year's best (in 2024) by the New York Times.

His first book, Braving Home (ISBN 0-618-44662-1), considered the lives of Americans who actively chose to live in or near dangerous places like volcanoes. The book was a main selection for the Book of the Month Club by Bill Bryson. His second book, Fame Junkies (ISBN 0-618-45369-5), considers the psychological underpinnings of celebrity obsession, and was the basis for an original series on National Public Radio's All Things Considered. Jake’s most recent nonfiction book, Bad Paper (2014), was excerpted as a cover story for the New York Times Magazine and was a New York Times best seller.

He co-wrote his first novel, Dormia, with Peter Kujawinski, and it was published in the spring of 2009 to mixed reviews. The two went on to co-write other books, including two Dormia sequels, called World's End and The Shadow Tree. Their other young adult novels include Nightfall and Edgeland.

Halpern also collaborated with illustrator Michael Sloan to create Welcome to the New World, a true comic about a family of Syrian refugees that ran in the New York Times. In 2018, Halpern and Sloan received the Pulitzer Prize for Editorial Cartooning.

Halpern is a former Fulbright Scholar and a current fellow of Morse College at Yale, where he teaches a seminar on journalism.

== Bibliography ==
=== Books ===
Nonfiction

- Braving home : dispatches from the Underwater Town, the Lava-Side Inn, and other extreme locales. Boston: Houghton Mifflin. 2003. ISBN 978-0-9653252-2-6.
- Fame Junkies: The Hidden Truths behind America's Favorite Addiction. Boston: Houghton Mifflin. 2007.
- Bad Paper: Chasing Debt from Wall Street to the Underworld. New York: FSG. 2014.
- Welcome to the New World. New York: The New York Times. 2017., true comic, with illustrator Michael Sloan

Fiction

- Dormia. Boston: Houghton Mifflin. 2009.
- Nightfall. New York: Putnam. 2015.
- Edge Land. New York: Putnam. 2017.

=== Essays and reporting ===
- "The Cop: Darren Wilson was not indicted for shooting Michael Brown. Many people question whether justice was done". The New Yorker. August 10, 2015.
- "A new underground railroad : refugees who fear deportation by the U.S. are sneaking into Canada (The online version is titled "The underground railroad for refugees")". Letter from Buffalo. The New Yorker. Vol. 93, no. 4. March 13, 2017. pp. 32–40.
