= Fair Debt Collection Practices Act =

U.S. consumer protection law

- Long title: An act to amend the Consumer Credit Protection Act to prohibit abusive practices by debt collectors.
- Acronyms (colloquial): FDCPA
- Enacted by: the 95th United States Congress

Citations
- Public law: Pub. L. 95–109
- Statutes at Large: 91 Stat. 874

Codification
- Titles amended: Title 15
- U.S.C. sections created: 15 U.S.C. §§ 1692–1692p

Legislative history
- Introduced in the House as H.R.5294 by Frank Annunzio (D–IL) on March 22, 1977; Passed the House on April 4, 1977; Passed the Senate on August 5, 1977 with amendment; House agreed to Senate amendment on September 8, 1977 (); Signed into law by President Jimmy Carter on September 20, 1977

United States Supreme Court cases
- Heintz v. Jenkins, 514 U.S. 291 (1995); Jerman v. Carlisle, McNellie, Rini, Kramer & Ulrich LPA, 559 U.S. 573 (2010); Marx v. General Revenue Corp., 568 U.S. 371 (2013); Sheriff v. Gillie, No. 15-338, 578 U.S. ___ (2016); Midland Funding, LLC v. Johnson, No. 16-348, 581 U.S. ___ (2017); Henson v. Santander Consumer USA Inc., No. 16-349, 582 U.S. ___ (2017); Obduskey v. McCarthy & Holthus LLP, No. 17-1307, 586 U.S. ___ (2019); Rotkiske v. Klemm, No. 18-328, 589 U.S. ___ (2019)

The Fair Debt Collection Practices Act (FDCPA), Pub. L. 95-109; 91 Stat. 874, codified as 15 U.S.C. § 1692 –1692p, approved on September 20, 1977 (and as subsequently amended), is a consumer protection amendment, establishing legal protection from abusive debt collection practices, to the Consumer Credit Protection Act, as Title VIII of that Act. The statute's stated purposes are: to eliminate abusive practices in the collection of consumer debts, to promote fair debt collection, and to provide consumers with an avenue for disputing and obtaining validation of debt information in order to ensure the information's accuracy. The Act creates guidelines under which debt collectors may conduct business, defines rights of consumers involved with debt collectors, and prescribes penalties and remedies for violations of the Act. It is sometimes used in conjunction with the Fair Credit Reporting Act.

== People and entities covered by the FDCPA ==
The FDCPA broadly defines a debt collector as "any person who uses any instrumentality of interstate commerce or the mails in any business the principal purpose of which is the collection of any debts, or who regularly collects or attempts to collect, directly or indirectly, debts owed or due or asserted to be owed or due another." While the FDCPA generally applies only to third party debt collectors—not internal collectors for an "original creditor"—some states, such as California, have similar state consumer protection laws which mirror the FDCPA, and regulate original creditors. In addition, some federal courts have ruled that a collector of debt is not a "creditor" but is rather a "debt collector" under the FDCPA where the collector of debt buys defaulted debt from an original creditor for the purpose of debt collection. The definitions and coverage have changed over time. The FDCPA itself contains numerous exceptions to the definition of a "debt collector", particularly after the October 13, 2006, passage of the Financial Services Regulatory Relief Act of 2006. Attorneys, originally explicitly exempted from the definition of a debt collector, have been included (to the extent that they otherwise meet the definition) since 1986.

The FDCPA's definitions of "consumers" and "debt" specifically restricts the coverage of the act to personal, family or household transactions. Thus, debts owed by businesses (or by individuals for business purposes) are not subject to the FDCPA.

In the federal tax case of Smith v. United States, the United States Court of Appeals for the Fifth Circuit stated that the taxpayer's "invocation of the Fair Debt Collection Act is entirely without merit, as the statute expressly excludes 'any officer or employee of the United States ... to the extent that collecting or attempting to collect any debt is in the performance of his official duties' from the definition of 'debt collector'. 15 U.S.C. section 1692a(6)(C)." In 1998, however, Congress amended the Internal Revenue Code by adding a new section 6304, "Fair Tax Collection Practices", which refers to and includes certain rules that are similar to some provisions of the Fair Debt Collection Practices Act.

In Henson v. Santander Consumer USA Inc., the Supreme Court excluded collection companies that purchase consumer debt from the FDCPA when it unanimously held that a company may collect debts that it purchased for its own account without triggering the statutory definition of a "debt collector" under the Fair Debt Collection Practices Act. Nonetheless, at least one subsequent Circuit Court opinion has cabined the impact of Henson by subsequently finding that companies that purchase consumer debt could still be subject to the FDCPA under the alternative definition of debt collector as a business whose "principal purpose" is the collection of debts.

== Prohibited conduct ==
The Act prohibits certain types of "abusive and deceptive" conduct when attempting to collect debts, including the following:

- Hours for phone contact: contacting consumers by telephone outside of the hours of 8:00 a.m. to 9:00 p.m. local time. Additionally, if certain hours are inconvenient for consumers during the allowable time (those who work at night and sleep during the day) they may not be contacted during those times.
- Failure to cease communication upon request: communicating with consumers in any way (other than litigation) after receiving written notice that said consumer wishes no further communication or refuses to pay the alleged debt, with certain exceptions, including advising that collection efforts are being terminated or that the collector intends to file a lawsuit or pursue other remedies where permitted.
- Causing a telephone to ring or engaging any person in telephone conversation repeatedly or continuously: with intent to annoy, abuse, or harass any person at the called number.
- Communicating with consumers at their place of employment after having been advised that this is unacceptable or prohibited by the employer.
- Contacting a consumer known to be represented by an attorney. The collector must contact the attorney instead, unless the attorney is unresponsive or consents to the client's being contacted directly.
- Communicating with a consumer after a request for validation has been made: communicating with the consumer or pursuing collection efforts by the debt collector after receipt of a consumer's written request for verification of a debt made within the 30-day validation period (or for the name and address of the original creditor on a debt) and before the debt collector mails the consumer the requested verification or the original creditor's name and address.
- Misrepresentation or deceit: misrepresenting the debt or using deception to collect the debt, including a debt collector's misrepresentation that he or she is an attorney or law enforcement officer.
- Publishing the consumer's name or address on a "bad debt" list.
- Seeking unjustified amounts, which would include demanding any amounts not permitted under an applicable contract or as provided under applicable law.
- Threatening arrest or legal action that is either not permitted or not actually contemplated.
- Abusive or profane language used in the course of communication related to the debt.
- Communication with third parties: revealing or discussing the nature of debts with third parties (other than the consumer's spouse or attorney). (Debt collectors are allowed to contact neighbors or co-workers but only to obtain location information; disreputable agencies often harass debtors with a "block party" or "office party" where they contact multiple neighbors or co-workers telling them they need to reach the debtor on an urgent matter.)
- Contact by embarrassing media, such as communicating with a consumer regarding a debt by post card, or using any language or symbol, other than the debt collector’s address, on any envelope when communicating with a consumer by use of mail or by telegram, except that a debt collector may use his business name if such name does not indicate that he is in the debt collection business.
- Reporting false information on a consumer's credit report or threatening to do so in the process of collection.

== Required conduct ==
The Act requires debt collectors to do the following (among other requirements):

- Identify themselves and notify the consumer, in every communication, that the communication is from a debt collector, and in the initial communication that any information obtained will be used to effect collection of the debt.
- Give the name and address of the original creditor (company to which the debt was originally payable) upon the consumer's written request made within 30 days of receipt of the §1692g notice.
- Notify the consumer of their right to dispute the debt (Section 809), in part or in full, with the debt collector. The 30-day "§1692g" notice is required to be sent by debt collectors within five days of the initial communication with the consumer, though in 2006 the definition of "initial communication" was amended to exclude "a formal pleading in a civil action" for purposes of triggering the §1692g notice, complicating the matter where the debt collector is an attorney or law firm. The consumer's receipt of this notice starts the clock running on the 30-day right to demand verification of the debt from the debt collector.
- Provide verification of the debt. If a consumer sends a written dispute or request for verification within 30 days of receiving the §1692g notice, then the debt collector must either mail the consumer the requested verification information or cease collection efforts altogether. Such asserted disputes must also be reported by the creditor to any credit bureau that reports the debt. Verification should include at a minimum the amount owed and the name and address of the original creditor.
- File a lawsuit in a proper venue. If a debt collector chooses to file a lawsuit, it may only be in a place where the consumer lives or signed the contract. Note, however, that this does not prevent the debt collector from being sued in other venues for violating the Act, such as when the consumer moves outside the venue and a letter demanding payment is forwarded to the new address, even if the debt collector is unaware of such a change in residence.

== Enforcement of the FDCPA ==
The Federal Trade Commission originally had the authority to administratively enforce the FDCPA using its powers under the Federal Trade Commission Act. However, under the sweeping reforms of the 2010 Dodd-Frank Act, the FDCPA is enforced primarily by the Consumer Financial Protection Bureau.

Aggrieved consumers may also file a private lawsuit in a state or federal court to collect damages (actual, statutory, attorney's fees, and court costs) from third-party debt collectors. The FDCPA is a strict liability law, which means that a consumer need not prove actual damages in order to claim statutory damages of up to $1,000 plus reasonable attorney fees if a debt collector is proven to have violated the FDCPA. The collector may, however, escape penalty if it shows that the violation (or violations) was unintentional and the result of a "bona fide error" that occurred despite procedures designed to avoid the error at issue.

Alternatively, if the consumer loses the lawsuit and the court determines that the consumer filed the case in bad faith and for the purposes of harassment, the court may then award attorney's fees to the debt collector. Another limitation is the one year statute of limitations, which the Supreme Court ruled in Rotkiske v. Klemm (2019) starts tolling from the date of the alleged violation, not from the date the incident was discovered.

== Criticisms of the FDCPA ==
=== By consumer groups ===
Some consumer groups argue that the FDCPA does not go far enough, and does not provide sufficient deterrence against unscrupulous collection agencies. Consumer groups have complained that the maximum statutory damages contained in the original 1977 version of the law has not kept up with inflation; $1,000 in 1977 dollars is worth $5313 as of 2025.

=== By the credit industry ===
Conversely, many in the credit industry and some courts have taken the stance that the FDCPA has often been used to file frivolous lawsuits and seek damages for minor technical violations and has, at times, seriously impeded their ability to collect valid debts. Given the strict liability nature of the FDCPA, the collections industry and the insurance companies that provide liability coverage for them have repeatedly lobbied Congress to relax provisions of the law to reduce their civil exposure for these "hyper-technical" violations.

The accounts receivable management industry has also raised concerns that the FDCPA contains contradictions that often lead to liability on the part of collection agencies in civil cases, especially when dealing with technology that did not exist when the law was written. For example, the FDCPA requires a collection agency to identify itself as such in any communication with a consumer. At the same time, a collection agency cannot disclose the debt of a consumer to anyone else. These two requirements are at odds when a collector leaves a message on an answering machine or voicemail system. If the collector identifies himself and his company, a third party could hear the message, thus resulting in a third party disclosure violation. Case law has tackled this issue but has not yet resolved it.

== Regulatory agencies and the FDCPA ==
For its part, the Federal Trade Commission (FTC) produces an annual report to Congress of its findings with respect to its FDCPA enforcement activities. This report details consumer complaints to the FTC about alleged debt collector violations of the FDCPA. The 2013 report indicated that the FTC received 125,136 consumer complaints about third party debt collectors in 2012, which is a decrease from the 144,451 received in 2011. The FTC receives more complaints about debt collectors than about any other specific industry, though the number of complaints represents a small percentage of the overall number of contacts by debt collectors with consumers.

The FTC has authority to issue formal opinions regarding debt collectors' conduct under the FDCPA, but the Dodd-Frank Wall Street Reform and Consumer Protection Act transfers authority for rule making to the new Consumer Financial Protection Bureau (CFPB) effective between January 21, 2011 and July 21, 2011. The FTC will retain FDCPA enforcement authority, but the CFPB will take over the FTC's advisory opinion function. Good faith conformity with a formal opinion of the FTC constitutes a second statutory defense under the FDCPA. The FTC has only rarely exercised its authority to issue advisory opinions, however. Prior to 2000, the FTC had not issued any advisory opinions regarding the FDCPA, it has issued only four such opinions through 2009.

In March 2021, the CFPB issued its annual report to Congress on its implementation of the FDCPA. The bureau had participated in four actions against alleged FDCPA violations. Two of the cases were resolved with over $15 million in redress. The bureau also offered information to assist consumers through the COVID-19 pandemic, data on debt collection activity for student loans, and conducted an 8,000-respondent survey to test disclosures explaining time-barred debt and its rules on debt collection.

== See also ==
- Consumer protection
- Fair Credit Reporting Act
- Consumer Credit Protection Act
- Debt buyer
