= Eliza Ann Otis =

American poet, journalist and philanthropist (1833–1904)

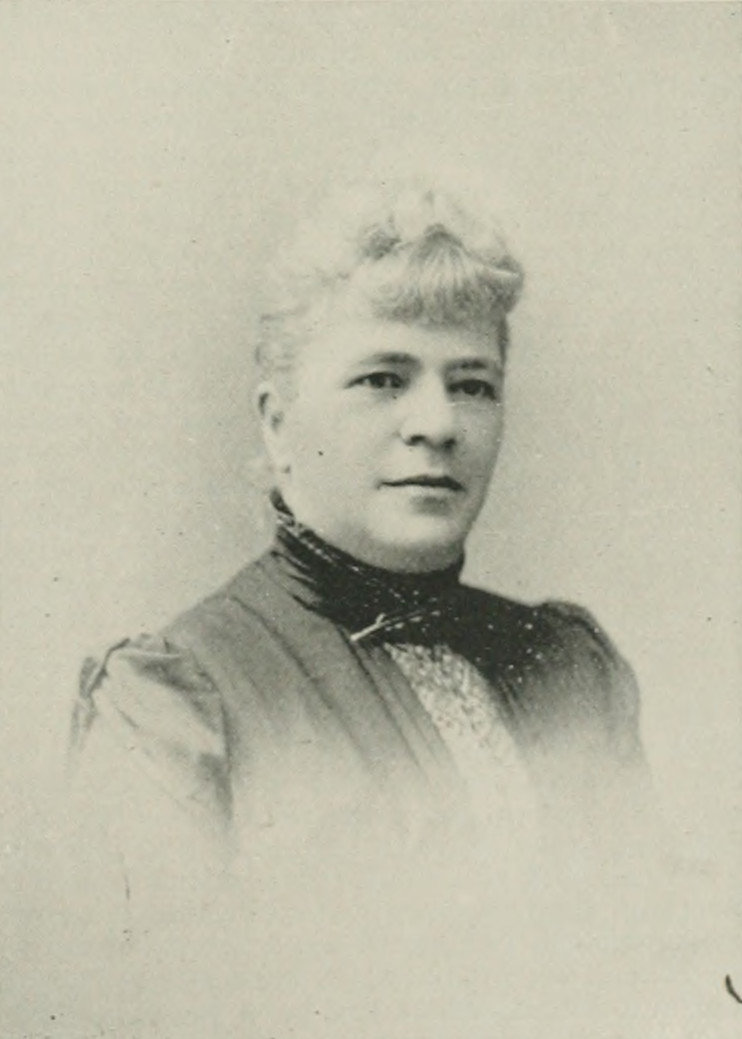
- "A woman of the century"
- Born: Eliza Ann Wetherby; August 16, 1833; Walpole, New Hampshire, U.S.
- Died: November 12, 1904 (aged 71); Westlake Village, California, U.S.
- Occupations: poet, journalist, publisher, editor, philanthropist
- Spouse: Harrison Gray Otis (m. 1859)
- Children: Emma Marian
- Relatives: Harry Chandler (son-in-law); Mike Chandler (great-great grandson); Otis Chandler (great-grandson); Norman Chandler (grandson); Dorothy Buffum Chandler (granddaughter-in-law)
- Writing career
- Pen name: Susan Sunshine
- Language: English
- Genres: prose, poetry

Eliza Ann Otis (pseudonym, Susan Sunshine; August 16, 1833 – November 12, 1904), née Wetherby, was an American poet, journalist, and philanthropist. She was the co-founder, publisher, and associate editor of the Los Angeles Times.

== Early years and education ==
Eliza Ann Wetherby was born in Walpole, New Hampshire on August 16, 1833. Nicknamed "Lizzie", she was a daughter of Charles Thomas Wetherby (1807-1871), a wealthy woolen manufacturer and minister who had opened the Wetherby Academy and named it for himself; and Nancy Hyde Wetherby (1809-1849), of Puritan stock.

She was educated in the schools of her native state and at Castleton Seminary (now Castleton University), Vermont, where she was graduated in 1856. The family had previously removed to Lowell, Ohio, and after her graduation, Otis rejoined her parents there.

Early in life, she developed a strong love for poetry, and her first productions were written when she was about ten years old. Her first published poem appeared in the Congregationalist when she was sixteen, with the paper commenting that it was a remarkable production for someone of her age.

== Career ==
On September 11, 1859, in Lowell, Ohio, she married Harrison Gray Otis, a printer's apprentice. He was a native of Ohio, but, at the time, a temporary resident of Louisville, Kentucky, to which city Mr. and Mrs. Otis removed shortly after their marriage. In 1860, she thought about the approaching Civil War and upbraided herself for not being able to help. When the war broke out, the husband entered the Union Army as a private, served honorably throughout the war, participating in many engagements, was twice wounded in battle, received seven promotions, and was twice breveted for gallant and meritorious conduct, rising to the rank of lieutenant-colonel by brevet.

After the war, they resided in Marietta, Ohio, the husband editing a small newspaper there, to which Mrs. Otis contributed. In 1867, they removed to Washington, D.C., where Col. Otis was in the civil service of the government, and both he and his wife kept up their interest in literary and journalistic pursuits.

In 1876, they removed to Santa Barbara, California, where Col. Otis conducted the Santa Barbara Daily Press, and, in 1882, they settled permanently in Los Angeles.

In 1879, he accepted the position of United States Treasury Agent in charge of the Seal Islands of Alaska, which position he resigned in 1882. Mrs. Otis spent a year with her husband in Saint Paul Island, and then they returned to Santa Barbara. Having disposed of his interest in the Press, Col. Otis purchased a share in the Los Angeles Times. Eventually, he held the controlling interest, and served as its editor-in-chief. She was the co-founder and publisher of the Los Angeles Times. Col. Otis also held the position of president and general manager of the Times Mirror Company.

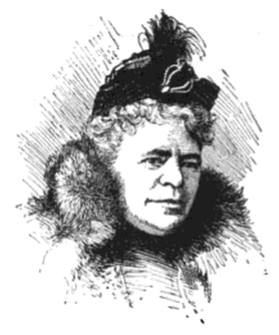
Eliza Otis (1910)

She was the author of the book Echoes from Elf-Land (Los Angeles, 1890), a volume of verse for children, which was published in 1890. The main body of her writings, however, was in the form of regular contributions, through many years, to the columns of the Los Angeles Times. Her special departments, among the most popular of the paper, were "Woman and Home" and "Our Boys and Girls". While she preferred writing poems, as a prose-writer, she was fluent and graceful. The diversity of her writings ranged from nature, art and religion to patriotism, love, war, sociology, and juvenile topics. These were collected, compiled and edited by her husband in 1905, and published in one large volume under the title of California, Where Sets the Sun. The volume contains an appendix entitled "Memorial Chimes," describing the bells erected by friends and admirers in Hollywood cemetery, in honor of his wife.

== Personal life ==
Otis made her home in Los Angeles. She and her husband had five children. A son, Harrison Gray, born 1861, died in infancy. There were also four daughters. Emma Marian married Harry Chandler. Ida Mabel (1871-1955) married Franklin Booth (1861-1956), who were the grandparents of Franklin Otis Booth Jr. Otis Chandler is a great-grandson. There was also Lilian (1864-1866), who died at age 2, and Esther (born 1876), who died in infancy.

She took an active interest in many lines of good work done by associated women, including the Woman's Parliament of Southern California, the Ruskin Art Club, Friday Morning Club, California State Congress of Mothers, and the Landmarks Club, all of her own city. She was a devoted member of the First Congregational Church of Los Angeles.

Otis died in her home, "The Bivouac", in Westlake Village, California, November 12, 1904. She was survived by her husband and three married daughters. The Eliza A. Otis Memorial Chimes in Hollywood Forever Cemetery are named in her honor.
