= Center Theatre Group =

Nonprofit organization in California, US

Coordinates: 34°3′28.84″N 118°14′51.2″W

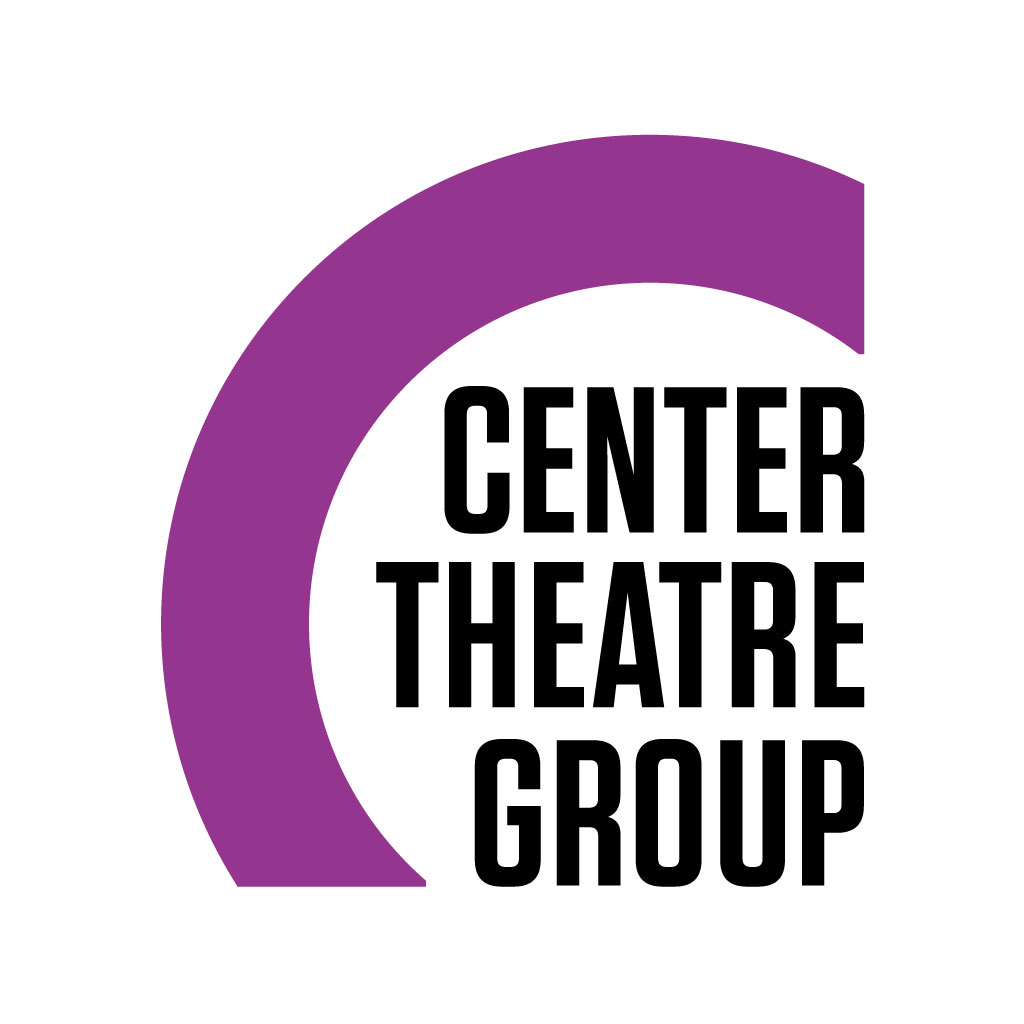
- Formation: 1967
- Type: Theatre group
- Location(s): Los Angeles, California; Culver City, California
- Artistic director: Snehal Desai

Center Theatre Group is a non-profit theatre company in Los Angeles, California. It is one of the largest theatre companies in the nation, programming subscription seasons year-round at the Mark Taper Forum, the Ahmanson Theatre (both at the Los Angeles Music Center in Los Angeles), and the Kirk Douglas Theatre (in Culver City, California). Founded in 1967 as a resident company of the Music Center, it has staged plays that won the Pulitzer Prize for Drama and Tony Awards, and the Mark Taper Forum received the Regional Theatre Tony Award in 1977.

Center Theatre Group is led by Artistic Director Snehal Desai and Managing Director/CEO Meghan Pressman. Charles Dillingham was the Managing Director of the Center Theatre Group in Los Angeles from 1991 through June 30, 2011.

== History ==
=== Founding ===
The Music Center grew out of a civic committee, chaired by Dorothy Chandler from 1955, to promote a performing arts facility for Los Angeles County. Its first hall, the Dorothy Chandler Pavilion, opened on December 6, 1964, and the Ahmanson Theatre and the Mark Taper Forum followed in April 1967.

The company grew out of the Theatre Group, a professional company at the University of California, Los Angeles. In 1966 Dorothy Chandler invited its managing director, Gordon Davidson, to run the new Mark Taper Forum, making him the company's founding artistic director. The film executive Lew Wasserman was the founding president of the company's board, and the Broadway producer Elliot Martin was the company's first director.

The Taper opened in April 1967 with John Whiting's The Devils, and the inaugural season had more than 30,000 subscribers. Later that year, the company's first production at the Ahmanson was the American premiere of Eugene O'Neill's More Stately Mansions, which opened on September 12, 1967, and later transferred to Broadway.

=== Davidson era (1967–2005) ===
The Taper's productions of In the Matter of J. Robert Oppenheimer and The Trial of the Catonsville Nine transferred to Broadway, and in 1970 The New York Times critic Clive Barnes wrote that Davidson was "doing some of the most valuable theater work in the country". Davidson also launched New Theatre for Now, a festival of experimental work. In 1978 the Taper staged Luis Valdez's Zoot Suit, about the treatment of Mexican Americans in 1940s Los Angeles. It drew a Latino audience but fared less well when it transferred to Broadway. Davidson directed Michael Cristofer's The Shadow Box and Mark Medoff's Children of a Lesser God, both of which went from the Taper to Broadway.

In the early 1990s the Taper presented Robert Schenkkan's The Kentucky Cycle and Tony Kushner's Angels in America, both staged at the Taper in 1992. The Taper staged the first complete production of Angels in America. From 1990 Davidson gave a slot at the Ahmanson or the Taper to each of the six new plays August Wilson wrote for his ten-play cycle.

Davidson took control of the Ahmanson as well as the Taper in 1989. In 2004 the 315-seat Kirk Douglas Theatre opened in Culver City as a home for new and experimental plays. Davidson inaugurated it with Charles Mee's A Perfect Wedding. His last production at the Taper was the American premiere of David Hare's Stuff Happens in June 2005, after which he retired.

=== Ritchie era (2005–2021) ===
Michael Ritchie, previously producer of the Williamstown Theatre Festival, succeeded Davidson as artistic director in January 2005. Over sixteen years he produced and presented 266 productions, including 49 world premieres, and productions that received a total of 59 Tony Award nominations. World premieres during his tenure included the musicals 13 and Soft Power and the plays Yellow Face, Bengal Tiger at the Baghdad Zoo, Water & Power, and Marjorie Prime. He began the company's artistic development program for new work, and in 2017 he launched the Edgerton Foundation Playwrights Initiative, which co-commissions plays with the Goodman Theatre, Second Stage Theater, the Royal Court Theatre, and the National Theatre.

During the COVID-19 pandemic the company continued its education programs and presented work online through its Digital Stage, and it reopened the Ahmanson in late November 2021 with A Christmas Carol. Ritchie retired at the end of 2021, saying he wanted to make room for new leadership and "new and diverse voices".

== Notable productions ==
| Production | Writer | Notes |
|---|---|---|
| The Devils (1967) | John Whiting | Opening production of the Mark Taper Forum |
| More Stately Mansions (1967) | Eugene O'Neill | American premiere and the company's first production at the Ahmanson. Transferred to Broadway |
| In the Matter of J. Robert Oppenheimer | Heinar Kipphardt | Transferred to Broadway |
| The Trial of the Catonsville Nine | Daniel Berrigan | Transferred to Broadway |
| The Shadow Box | Michael Cristofer | Directed by Davidson. Opened on Broadway March 31, 1977. Pulitzer Prize for Drama. Davidson won the Tony Award for directing it |
| Zoot Suit (1978) | Luis Valdez | Commissioned by the Taper. Opened on Broadway March 25, 1979 |
| Children of a Lesser God (1979) | Mark Medoff | Directed by Davidson. Ran more than two years on Broadway. Tony Awards for John Rubinstein and Phyllis Frelich |
| Jelly's Last Jam | George C. Wolfe | Originally produced by the Taper. Opened on Broadway April 26, 1992 |
| The Kentucky Cycle (1992) | Robert Schenkkan | Pulitzer Prize for Drama, 1992 |
| Angels in America (1992) | Tony Kushner | First complete production. Pulitzer Prize for Drama, 1993. Tony Award for Best Play, 1994 |
| Twilight: Los Angeles, 1992 | Anna Deavere Smith | Developed and staged at the Taper. Nominated for the Tony Award for Best Play, 1994 |
| Stuff Happens (2005) | David Hare | American premiere |
| Curtains | John Kander, Fred Ebb, Rupert Holmes | Co-produced on Broadway by the company. Opened March 22, 2007 |
| 9 to 5 | Dolly Parton, Patricia Resnick | Co-produced on Broadway by the company. Opened April 30, 2009 |

== Awards ==
- 1977: Regional Theatre Tony Award, to the Mark Taper Forum
- 1977: Tony Award for Best Direction of a Play, to Gordon Davidson for The Shadow Box
- Pulitzer Prize for Drama: The Shadow Box (1977). The Kentucky Cycle (1992) and Angels in America (1993), both staged at the Taper, were the first plays to win the prize without a New York staging
- 1994: three of the four Tony nominees for Best Play (The Kentucky Cycle, Twilight: Los Angeles, 1992, and the winner, Angels in America) had been developed and staged at the Taper
