= English Grey budgerigar mutation =

Genetic mutation affecting the colour of budgerigars

The English Grey budgerigar mutation is one of approximately 30 mutations affecting the colour of budgerigars. It appeared briefly in the 1930s but was lost shortly after and until recently was believed to be no longer extant. However, the appearance of the anthracite budgerigar mutation in 1998 with a seemingly identical appearance and identical genetic behaviour, insofar as can now be determined, suggests the mutation may have been regained.

== Appearance ==
The English Grey variety is very similar in appearance to the Dominant Grey. The original reports described the English Grey in the Blue series as being slate grey with a dark grey to black rump, a white mask carrying black or almost black spots and dark grey, bordering on black, cheek patches, black and white wings and an intense black tail. When compared side by side with the Dominant Grey the English Grey was seen to be generally darker, with the cheek patches being particularly so. Both Dominant and English Greys were produced in the three shades of Dark, with a noticeable though slight difference in shade. The English Grey Skyblue was stated to be darker than the Australian Grey Mauve.

The English Grey of the Green series was grey-green in colour and very like today's Grey-Green of the Dominant Grey variety.

== Historical notes ==
The history of the English Grey begins in 1933, when Mr T Watson of Bedford, England, discovered and purchased a hen of a slatey grey colour from a dealer. This may or may not have been an English Grey, as Mr Watson failed to establish the strain, but his report in 1935 of the bird's existence prompted both Mr E W Brooks of Mitcham, Surrey to report his breeding of Greys from two Cobalts in 1934, and Mrs S Harrison of Australia to report her breeding of Greys in the same year. Mrs Harrison's birds, of course, led to the foundation of today's Dominant Grey variety.

In 1933 Mr Brooks purchased a pair of Cobalts from a dealer and paired them together for five seasons between 1934 and 1938, producing at least 25 Greys, giving full details of all his breeding records in the Budgerigar Bulletin up to the issue in September 1938, but after that no further mention of them is made. Britain was increasingly preparing for war throughout the whole of the year from September 1938, and many fanciers were forced to abandon breeding budgerigars throughout this difficult period. It is assumed that the English Grey was lost as an established mutation around that time, although the gene may still exist intermingling with Dominant Greys, or possibly (if one theory of the gene action is correct) masquerading as a Cobalt (see Genetics below).

Mr Alf Ormerod also reported breeding a grey unexpectedly from two Cobalts around 1935. The hen of the pair was obtained from Mrs Codner of Torquay and was a "muddy colour, half way between a Cobalt and a Mauve." All the young from this pair over two seasons were Cobalts, with one exception: a grey cock with black flights and tail feathers. The following year this grey cock produced an "Olive which was nearly black" and several grey hens. These were quality exhibition birds—the foundation of Mr Ormerod's award-winning strain of greys. Descendants of these greys undoubtedly exist today, it is unknown whether they are Dominant Greys or English Greys.

A grey mutation, believed to have a recessive action, appeared in the aviaries of Peter Bergman, of Sydney in 1992. Some feathers have been examined microscopically by Inte Onsman, who reported that their internal structures appeared to be different from those of the English Grey as reported by Taylor and Warner. They have concluded that this is a new mutation and have given it the name Australian Recessive Grey. Intriguingly, this mutation also appeared from a mating of two Cobalts, in this case Visual Violets.

A further grey mutation, the anthracite, appeared in Germany in 1998 in the aviaries of Hans Lenk, who successfully established the strain. A bird with two anthracite factors has an extremely dark grey body, jet black markings and the cheek patches of the same grey as the body. A single anthracite factor has a similar effect to the Dark mutation, causing a Skyblue to become Cobalt in appearance - as was suspected with the English Grey (see Genetics below). In fact, the similarity of the anthracite to the English Grey is striking. The description is virtually identical, and the cobalt appearance of a Skyblue with a single anthracite factor is exactly what was suspected for the English Grey. This may be the re-emergence of the English Grey.

== Genetics ==
Due to the similar appearance of the English and Dominant Greys they were first thought to be the same variety, although the reported breeding results showed clearly that Mrs Harrison's birds were the result of a simple dominant gene whereas Mr Brooks' Greys could not be so easily explained. The evidence for the different breeding behaviour gradually built up, and by 1938 there was no doubt that the two mutations were distinct.

Mr Brooks published clear and detailed breeding records of all his English Grey pairings between 1933 and 1938 in the Budgerigar Bulletin. The first English Grey was bred from a pair of Cobalts, and a similar pairing of two Cobalts later bred further English Greys. This shows that the mutation cannot be dominant, and led many, initially including Mr Brooks himself, to assume that the mutation was therefore recessive. Indeed, the mutation is often called the Recessive Grey, and both Taylor and Warner and Elliot and Brooks give breeding expectations based on the assumption of simple recessive inheritance.

However, the breeding results reported by Mr Brooks show that the mutation cannot be a simple recessive. For example, he reports that a pair of English Greys bred a Skyblue and a Cobalt, and an English Grey paired to an unrelated bird bred two English Greys. A further anomaly to be explained is the lack of Mauves from the Cobalt x Cobalt pairings.

As the mutation discovered by Mr Brooks is no longer extant its genetic behaviour cannot be investigated further, but the extensive breeding results of Mr Brooks do permit some speculation about its nature. The breeding behaviour was initially considered by Dr H Steiner and was later examined in detail by both Prof F A E Crewe and Dr T Daniels. All these writers come to a similar conclusion, namely that the reported breeding results can only be explained by assuming the English Grey gene produces a similar effect to, and interacts with, the Dark gene. Following Dr Steiner, Dr Daniels proposed that the English Grey gene is autosomal and incompletely dominant to its wild-type allele. In the visual English Grey the depth of the cloudy zone is known to be very small, just 1-2μ. He suggested that the English Grey gene reduces the depth of the cloudy zone rather as the Dark gene does, although perhaps to a slightly greater degree. A blue series bird heterozygous for English Grey would have an appearance very similar to a Cobalt, maybe a little darker, and a bird homozygous for English Grey would appear grey, as described in Appearance above. Also, on this hypothesis, a bird with one English Grey allele and one or two Dark alleles would also appear grey. Dr Daniels states that this hypothesis satisfactorily explains all the breeding results reported by Mr Brooks, including the lack of Mauves. The behaviour and appearance of the recently discovered anthracite mutation (see Historical notes above) appears to follow exactly this hypothesis.
