= Anthracite budgerigar mutation =

Genetic mutation affecting the colour of budgerigars

The Anthracite budgerigar mutation is an extremely rare mutation that occurs in the budgerigar. The mutation, similar to the Violet budgerigar mutation, causes a difference in the coloring of budgerigars. Anthracites have black or very dark gray feathers, possibly with some white depending on the budgerigar in particular. The mutation is believed to have started in Germany, and tends to be local to that area. Currently, most owners wishing to obtain an Anthracite need to import these budgerigars from Germany.

The description and genetic behaviour of the Anthracite and English Grey are identical, insofar as this can now be determined. It seems likely that the Anthracite is the re-emergence of the English Grey.

== Appearance ==
A bird with two Anthracite factors has an extremely dark grey body, jet black markings and the cheek patches of the same very dark grey as the body. G W von Kamrath describes them as "jet black wing and tail markings and deep black cheek patches".

A single Anthracite factor has a similar effect to the Dark mutation, causing a Skyblue to become Cobalt in appearance.

== Historical notes ==
The Anthracite mutation appeared in Germany in 1998 in the aviaries of Hans-Jürgen H Lenk, who successfully established the strain and continues to report on its development. Initially found only in Germany, by the end of 2008 descendants of this original mutation had been exported to America, Belgium, Canada, England, Finland, Holland, Italy, Norway, Sweden, Switzerland and Pakistan.

== Genetics ==
The Anthracite mutation has an incompletely dominant relationship with its wild-type allele. That is, it shows a visible effect when present as a single factor (heterozygote or SF) and a different effect when present as a double factor (homozygote or DF).

In the green series varieties the SF Anthracite Light Green has one Anthracite allele and one wild-type allele at the Anthracite locus. This darkens the body colour to a shade somewhat deeper than a Dark Green. The DF Anthracite Light Green, with two Anthracite alleles, is a deep olive colour.

In the blue series varieties the SF Anthracite Skyblue has one Anthracite allele and one wild-type allele, with a body colour rather like a deep Cobalt. The DF Anthracite Skyblue with two Anthracite alleles, the true Anthracite variety, has a dark grey, almost black, body colour with mauve overtones.

Because the Anthracite factor is always visibly expressed no budgerigar can be split for Anthracite. The heterozygotes of Anthracite with just one Anthracite allele correspond to the splits of recessive mutations.

A single Anthracite factor has a similar effect to the Dark mutation, causing a Skyblue to become Cobalt in appearance - as was suspected with the English Grey. In fact, the similarity of the Anthracite to the English Grey is striking. The description is virtually identical, and the cobalt appearance of a Skyblue with a single Anthracite factor is exactly what was suspected for the English Grey.

The interaction of the Anthracite and Dark budgerigar mutations has not yet been investigated. It is expected that a combination of the two factors will deepen the body colour even more.
