= Charles Abel Buffum =

American politician and businessman

5th Mayor of Long Beach
- In office 1921–1924
- Preceded by: William T. Lisenby
- Succeeded by: Ray R. Clark

Personal details
- Born: January 30, 1870; La Fayette, Illinois, U.S.
- Died: October 1936 (aged 66)
- Spouse: Fern Smith Buffum
- Children: Dorothy Buffum Chandler; Harry A. Buffum; Thurlyne Buffum
- Relatives: Norman Chandler (son-in-law); Otis Chandler (grandson); Mike Chandler (great-grandson)

Charles Abel Buffum (January 30, 1870 – October 1936) was an American businessman and politician. In 1904, with his brother, Edwin E. Buffum, he moved to Long Beach, California and purchased a store that would grow into Buffum's Department Stores chain. He served as the fifth mayor of Long Beach, California from 1921 to 1924.

== Civic involvement ==
Buffum was known for his civic involvement; he served on the Long Beach Board of Education for six years and in 1920 became president of the Chamber of Commerce. He served as mayor of Long Beach from 1921 to 1924, and was noted for his support for the development of the Port of Long Beach.

== Marriage and family ==
He married Fern Smith in 1895 and they were the parents of three children: Harry A., Thurlyne, and Dorothy Mae. In 1922 Dorothy married Norman Chandler, who later became publisher of his family's newspaper, the Los Angeles Times. The Dorothy Chandler Pavilion in Los Angeles is named for Dorothy, who was a prominent patron of the arts.

The city of Long Beach has designated his house, designed by W. Horace Austin, a historic landmark.
