= Yellow Face =

Yellowface is a theatrical makeup to portray a stereotype of East Asians.

Yellow face may also refer to:

- Yellow Face (play), a 2007 play by David Henry Hwang
- Yellow Face (film), a 2010 film by Han Tang
- "The Yellow Face", an alternative title for the 1893 short "The Adventure of the Yellow Face" by Arthur Conan Doyle
- Yellowface (novel), a 2023 novel by R. F. Kuang
- Yellowface budgerigar mutation
  - Yellowface I budgerigar mutation
  - Yellowface II budgerigar mutation
- Neoerythromma cultellatum, the Caribbean yellowface dragonfly
- Yellow Face, a character from Battle for Dream Island, an animated web series
