= Marian Chandler =

Marian Chandler may refer to:

- Marian Otis Chandler (1866–1952), Secretary of the Times-Mirror Company
- Marian Chandler (All My Children), a fictional character in the U.S. TV soap opera All My Children
