= Marian Otis Chandler =

American businesswoman (1866–1952)

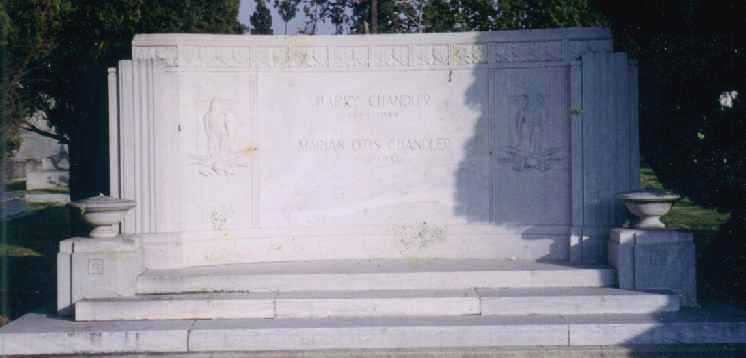
- Chandler's grave at Hollywood Forever Cemetery on Santa Monica Boulevard in Los Angeles
- Born: Marian Otis; July 1, 1866; Marietta, Ohio, U.S.
- Died: August 9, 1952 (aged 86); Los Angeles, California, U.S.
- Spouse: Harry Chandler (m. 1894-1944, his death)
- Children: 6, including Norman Chandler, and 2 stepchildren
- Parent(s): Harrison Gray Otis; Eliza Ann Wetherby
- Relatives: Dorothy Buffum Chandler (daughter-in-law); Otis Chandler (grandson); Mike Chandler (great-grandson)

Marian Otis Chandler (July 1, 1866 – August 9, 1952) was the secretary and a director of the Times-Mirror Company, which published the Los Angeles Times.

== Biography ==
She was born as Emma Marian Otis July 1, 1866, in Marietta, Ohio, to Harrison Gray Otis (publisher) and Eliza Ann Wetherby. Marian had three sisters, Mabel, Lilian, and Esther (who died in infancy),{} and a brother, Harrison Gray (who died in infancy).{}

In 1894, Marian married Harry Chandler, who later became publisher of the Los Angeles Times. Marian and Harry raised eight children together, two from Harry's first marriage, and six of their own. Norman Chandler (1899–1973), became publisher of the Times after his father's death.

After the death of her husband in 1944, Mrs. Chandler resigned as secretary; a month later she was elected chairman of the Times-Mirror board. She also was vice president of the Chandis Securities Company and vice-president of the Southwest Land Company and the Southwest Company. She was known for her numerous philanthropies.

She died on August 9, 1952, at her home in the Los Feliz foothills, Los Angeles, California., owned many years later by Father Yod. She was buried at Hollywood Forever Cemetery in Hollywood, California. She left seven children — Mrs. Roger Goodan (Alice May), Mrs. Earle E. Crowe (Constance), Mrs. John J. Garland (Helen), Mrs. James G. Boswell (Ruth), Norman Chandler. Philip Chandler and Harrison Chandler, as well as a sister, Mabel Otis Booth.

== Legacy ==
- The community of Reseda, California, was originally named Marian, after Mrs. Chandler.
- A freighter ship built in 1917 (originally named War Flame but known as Empire Leopard when torpedoed and sunk November 2, 1942, by the German submarine U-402) was bought in 1929 by the Los Angeles Steamship Company and renamed Marian Otis Chandler, holding that name until it was sold again in 1939.
