= 1983 24 Hours of Daytona =

Endurance sports car race

Previous: 1982	Next: 1984
Index: Races | Winners

The Silver Anniversary Edition 24 Hour Pepsi Challenge was a 24-hour endurance sports car race held on February 5–6, 1983 at the Daytona International Speedway road course. The race served as the opening round of the 1983 IMSA GT Championship.

Victory overall and in the GTP class went to the No. 6 Henn's Swap Shop Racing Porsche 935 driven by Bob Wollek, Claude Ballot-Léna, Preston Henn, and A. J. Foyt. Victory in the GTO class went to the No. 7 Racing Beat Mazda RX-7 driven by Pete Halsmer, Bob Reed, and Rick Knoop. Victory in the GTU class went to the No. 92 Kent Racing Mazda RX-7 driven by Lee Mueller, Hugh McDonough, and Terry Visger.

== Race results ==
Class winners in bold.

Pos	Class	No	Team	Drivers	Car	Laps
1	**GTP**	**6**	(United States) **Henn's Swap Shop Racing**	(France) **Bob Wollek** (France) **Claude Ballot-Léna** (United States) **Preston Henn** (United States) **A. J. Foyt**	**Porsche 935**	**618**
2	GTP	88	(United States) Motorsports Marketing	(United States) Terry Wolters (United States) Randy Lanier (United States) Marty Hinze	March 83G	612
3	**GTO**	**7**	(United States) **Racing Beat**	(United States) **Pete Halsmer** (United States) **Bob Reed** (United States) **Rick Knoop**	**Mazda RX-7**	**598**
4	GTP	24	(United States) Pegasus III Racing	(United States) M. L. Speer (United States) Ken Madren (United States) Ray Ratcliff	Porsche 935	578
5	GTO	50	(United States) Latino Racing	(Puerto Rico) Diego Febles (Costa Rica) Kikos Fonseca (Costa Rica) Roy Valverde	Porsche 911 Carrera RSR	568
6	GTP	10	(United States) Cooke Racing	(United States) Ralph Kent-Cooke (United States) Jim Adams (United Kingdom) John Bright	Lola T600	563
7	GTO	05	(United States) T&R Racing	(United States) Tico Almeida (Cuba) Miguel Morejon (Venezuela) Ernesto Soto	Porsche 911 Carrera RSR	561
8	GTP	77	(United States) Z&W Enterprises	(United States) Walt Bohren (United States) Pierre Honneger (United Kingdom) David Palmer	Mazda GTP	553
9	GTO	9	(United States) Personalized Autohaus	(United States) Wayne Baker (United States) Jim Mullen (United States) Bob Garretson	Porsche 934	551
10	GTO	35	(United States) Pegasus Racing	(United States) Paul Gilgan (United States) Al Leon (United States) Wayne Pickering	Porsche 911 Carrera RSR	547
11	GTP	47	(United States) Frank Rubino	(United States) Frank Rubino (United States) Pepe Romero (United States) Doc Bundy (United States) Dale Whittington	Porsche 935	546
12	**GTU**	**92**	(United States) **Kent Racing**	(United States) **Lee Mueller** (United States) **Hugh McDonough** (United States) **Terry Visger**	**Mazda RX-7**	**544**
13	GTO	58	(United States) Brumos Racing	(United States) Kathy Rude (United States) Deborah Gregg (United States) Bonnie Henn	Porsche 924 Carrera GTR	531
14	GTU	90	(United States) 901 Shop	(United States) Mike Schaefer (United States) Jack Refenning (United States) John Belperche (United States) Doug Zitza	Porsche 911	525
15	GTO	61	(United States) Vista Racing	(United States) Brent O'Neill (United States) Don Courtney (United States) Luis Sereix	Chevrolet Monza	525
16 DNF	GTP	86	(United States) Bayside Disposal Racing	(United States) Hurley Haywood (United States) Bruce Leven (United States) Al Holbert	Porsche 935	515
17	GTU	60	(United States) Team Morrison	(United States) Steve Dietrich (United States) Chris Ivey (United States) Jim Cook	Mazda RX-7	514
18	GTO	85	(United Kingdom) Richard Lloyd	(United Kingdom) Richard Lloyd (United States) George Drolsom (United Kingdom) Jonathan Palmer	Porsche 924 Carrera GTR	500
19	GTU	38	(United States) Mandeville Auto/Tech	(United States) Roger Mandeville (United States) Amos Johnson (United States) Danny Smith	Mazda RX-7	476
20	GTO	4	(United States) Statagraph, Inc.	(United States) Billy Hagan (United States) Terry Labonte (United States) Lloyd Frink	Chevrolet Camaro	467
21	GTU	63	(United States) RGP 500 Racing	(United States) Jim Downing (United States) John Maffucci (United States) Steve Potter	Mazda RX-7	466
22	GTO	29	(United States) Overby's	(United States) Robert Overby (United States) Chris Doyle (United States) Don Bell	Chevrolet Camaro	438
23	GTU	37	(United States) Burdsall-Welter Racing	(United States) Tom Burdsall (United States) Peter Welter (United States) Al Bacon	Mazda RX-7	436
24 DNF	GTO	26	(United States) Auriga Racing	(United States) Tom Nehl (United States) Nelson Silcox (United States) R. J. Valentine	Chevrolet Camaro	426
25 DNF	GTP	1	(United States) JLP Racing	(United States) John Paul Jr. (United States) Rene Rodriguez (Italy) Joe Castellano	Porsche 935	412
26 DNF	GTO	13	(United States) Gordon Oftedahl	(United States) Duane Eitel (United States) Mike Brummer (United States) Phil Pate	Pontiac Firebird	411
27	GTO	28	(United States) Avanti	(United States) Herb Adams (United States) John Martin (United States) Joe Ruttman (United States) Leonard Emanuelson	Avanti II	410
28	GTO	40	(Canada) Bieri Racing	(Canada) Uli Bieri (Canada) Matt Gysler (Canada) Duff Hubbard	BMW M1	406
29	GTU	97	(United States) All American Racers	(United States) Wally Dallenbach Jr. (United States) Willy T. Ribbs (United States) Whitney Ganz	Toyota Celica	365
30	GTO	75	(United States) Bard Boand	(United States) Bard Boand (United States) Richard Anderson (United States) Mike Stephens	Chevrolet Corvette	358
31 DNF	GTP	83	(United States) Thomas T. Ciccone	(United States) Mike Gassaway (United States) Scott Smith (United States) Joe Cogbill (United States) Joe Cogbill Jr.	Chevrolet Camaro	357
32	GTU	52	(United States) TFC Racing	(United States) Tom Cripe (United States) Dick Gauthier (United States) David Duncan (United States) Jack Swanson	Porsche 911	312
33 DNF	GTU	71	(United States) Morgan Performance Technology	(United States) Charles Morgan (United States) Bill Johnson (United States) Jim Miller	Datsun 280ZX	305
34 DNF	GTU	27	(United States) Scuderia Rosso	(United States) Jim Fowells (United States) Ray Mummery (United States) Tom Sheehy	Mazda RX-7	300
35 DNF	GTU	78	(United States) Der Klaus Haus	(United States) Klaus Bitterauf (United States) Vicki Smith (United States) Scott Flanders	Porsche 911	299
36 DNF	GTP	65	(United States) Ron Spangler	(United States) Carson Baird (United States) Chip Mead (United States) Tom Pumpelly	Ferrari 512	294
37 DNF	GTO	23	(United States) Superior Racing Team	(United States) Raul Garcia (United States) Vince DiLella (United States) Armando Fernandez	Chevrolet Camaro	285
38	GTO	01	(United States) Marketing Corporation	(United States) John Morton (United States) Tom Klausler (United States) Ronnie Bucknum	Ford Mustang	284
39 DNF	GTO	72	(United States) John Josey	(United States) Gary Baker (United States) Sterling Marlin	Chevrolet Corvette	284
40	GTO	41	(United States) Starved Rock Ledge	(United States) Rusty Schmidt (United States) Scott Schmidt	Chevrolet Corvette	263
41	GTO	49	(United States) OMR Engines	(United States) Hoyt Overbagh (United States) Peter Kirill (United States) David Price	Chevrolet Monza	243
42 DNF	GTU	66	(United States) Mike Meyer Racing	(United States) Jack Dunham (United States) Jeff Kline (United States) Jon Compton	Mazda RX-7	242
43 DNF	GTO	45	(United States) Statagraph, Inc.	(United States) Gene Felton (United States) Tom Williams (United States) Lloyd Frink	Chevrolet Camaro	223
44 DNF	GTP	21	(United Kingdom) Nimrod Racing	(United States) Lyn St. James (Canada) John Graham (United States) Drake Olson	Nimrod NRA/C2	208
45 DNF	GTO	79	(United States) Whitehall Productions	(United States) Tom Winters (United States) Bob Bergstrom (United States) Peter Dawe	Porsche 924 Carrera GTR	193
46 DNF	GTO	55	(United States) B de T Racing	(Colombia) Diego Montoya (United States) Terry Herman (United States) Tony Garcia	BMW M1	172
47 DNF	GTO	14	(United States) Oftedahl Racing	(United States) Bob Raub (United States) Sam Moses (United States) Carl Shafer	Pontiac Firebird	165
48 DNF	GTU	16	(United States) Paul Goral	(United States) Paul Goral (United States) Larry Figaro (United States) Nort Northam	Porsche 911	161
49 DNF	GTP	74	(United States) Mark Wagoner	(United States) Del Russo Taylor (United States) Mike Angus (United States) Wayne Dessinger	Chevron GTP	152
50 DNF	GTP	44	(United States) Group 44	(United States) Bob Tullius (Canada) Bill Adam (United States) Pat Bedard	Jaguar XJR-5	130
51 DNF	GTU	98	(United States) All American Racers	(United States) Dennis Aase (United States) Al Unser Jr. (United States) Mike Chandler	Toyota Celica	130
52 DNF	GTO	89	Taca El Salvador	(El Salvador) "Jamsal" (El Salvador) Eduardo Galdamez (El Salvador) Eduardo Barrientos	Porsche 911 Carrera RSR	122
53 DNF	GTO	31	(United States) Kendco	(United States) Dale Kreider (United States) Dick Neland	Chevrolet Camaro	122
54 DNF	GTP	11	(United Kingdom) Nimrod Racing	(United States) A. J. Foyt (United States) Darrell Waltrip (Argentina) Guillermo Maldonado	Nimrod NRA/C2	121
55 DNF	GTO	67	(United States) Trans Am Specialties	(United States) Elliott Forbes-Robinson (United States) Gary Witzenburg (United States) Tony Swan	Pontiac Firebird	121
56 DNF	GTU	42	(United States) Gary Wonzer	(United States) Bill Bean (United States) Buzz Cason (United States) Gary Wonzer	Porsche 911	118
57 DNF	GTU	99	(United States) All American Racers	(United States) Gene Hackman (Japan) Masanori Sekiya (Japan) Kaoru Hoshino	Toyota Celica	118
58 DNF	GTO	64	(United States) John Hulen	(United States) John Hulen (United States) Ron Coupland (United States) Bob Speakman	Porsche 911 Carrera RSR	118
59 DNF	GTO	15	(United States) D&L Performance	(United States) Doug Lutz (United States) Dave Panaccione (United States) Larry Connor (United States) Fern Prego	Porsche 911 Carrera RSR	113
60 DNF	GTO	81	(United States) Robert Whitaker	(United States) Robert Whitaker (United States) Bill McDill (United States) Karl Keck	Chevrolet Camaro	98
61 DNF	GTO	36	(United States) Herman & Miller P&A	(United States) Paul Miller (United States) Jim Busby (United States) Ron Grable	Porsche 924 Carrera GTR	91
62	GTO	06	(United States) Bobby Diehl	(United States) Bobby Diehl (United States) Roy Newsome	Mazda RX-7	87
63 DNF	GTO	43	(United States) Bob Gregg Racing	(United States) Bob Richardson (United States) Bob Young (United States) Bob Gregg	Chevrolet Camaro	85
64 DNF	GTO	04	(United States) Paul Canary Racing	(United States) Paul Canary (Belgium) Jean-Paul Libert (Belgium) Pascal Witmeur (France) Roger Carmillet	Pontiac Firebird	85
65 DNF	GTU	32	(United States) Richard Cline	(United States) Rick Cline (United States) Paul Romano (United States) Mike Powell	Mazda RX-7	82
66 DNF	GTO	84	(United States) Motorsport Marketing	(United States) Emory Donaldson (United States) Steve Pope (United States) Ken Murray	Chevrolet Camaro	79
67 DNF	GTO	07	(Canada) Heimrath Racing	(Canada) Ludwig Heimrath (Canada) Ludwig Heimrath Jr.	Porsche 934	71
68 DNF	GTU	30	(United States) Case Racing	(United States) Jack Rynerson (United States) Ron Case	Porsche 911	67
69 DNF	GTU	51	(United States) Red Roof Inns	(United States) Doug Carmean (United States) Don Herman (United States) John Finger	Mazda RX-7	57
70 DNF	GTU	82	(United States) Trinity Racing	(United States) Joe Varde (United States) John Casey (United States) Jack Baldwin	Mazda RX-7	52
71 DNF	GTO	87	(United States) Bob Beasley	(United States) Bob Beasley (United States) John Ashford (United States) Jack Lewis	Porsche 911 Carrera RSR	52
72 DNF	GTP	0	(United States) Interscope Racing	(United States) Ted Field (United States) Bill Whittington (United States) Danny Ongais	Lola T600	47
73 DNF	GTP	5	(United States) Bob Akin Motor Racing	(United States) Bob Akin (United States) John O'Steen (United States) Dale Whittington	Porsche 935	43
74 DNF	GTP	03	(Switzerland) Angelo Pallavicini	(Switzerland) Angelo Pallavicini (United States) Werner Frank	Porsche 935	24
75 DNF	GTO	02	(United States) Marketing Corp. of America	(United States) Milt Minter (United States) Ronnie Bucknum	Ford Mustang	24
76 DNF	GTP	6	(United States) JLP Racing	(United States) John Paul (United States) Phil Currin	Porsche 935	15
77 DNF	GTP	25	(United States) Red Lobster Racing	(United States) Dave Cowart (United States) Kenper Miller (Colombia) Mauricio de Narváez	March 82G	14
78 DNF	GTO	09	(United States) Mark Gassaway	(United States) Tom Ciccone (United States) Vic Shinn (United States) Joe Cogbill	Chevrolet Camaro	6
79 DNF	GTO	19	(United States) Van Every Racing	(United States) Lance van Every (United States) Ash Tisdelle	Porsche 911 Carrera RSR	0
DNS	GTP	00	(United States) Interscope Racing	(United States) Ted Field (United States) Bill Whittington (United States) Danny Ongais	Lola T600	-
DNS	GTP	2	(United States) Hinze Fencing	(United States) Marty Hinze	Porsche 935	-
DNS	GTO	17	(United States) Dingman Bros. Racing	(United States) Billy Dingman (United States) Roger Bighouse (United States) John Gunn	Chevrolet Corvette	-
DNS	GTO	18	(United States) Bill Nelson	(United States) Vincent Collins (United States) Bill Nelson (United States) Lojza Vosta	Pontiac Firebird	-
DNS	GTO	20	(United States) Dale Kreider	(United States) Dale Kreider (United States) Dave Heinz	Chevrolet Corvette	-
DNS	GTU	39	(United States) Donald Flores	(United States) Donald Flores (United States) Robert Gottfried (United States) Howdy Holmes	Porsche 911	-
DNS	GTU	69	(United States) Conrado Casado	(Colombia) Ricardo Londoño (Colombia) Diego Londoño (United States) Fred Flaquer	Porsche 911	-
DNS	GTU	73	(United States) G.O. Racing	(United States) Ken Grostic (United States) Keith Lawhorn	Porsche 914	-
