= Norman Chandler =

American newspaper publisher

- Chandler in 1971
- Born: September 14, 1899; Los Angeles, California, U.S.
- Died: October 20, 1973 (aged 74); Los Angeles, California, U.S.
- Occupation: Newspaper publisher
- Spouse: Dorothy Buffum Chandler (m. 1922)
- Children: Camilla Chandler; Otis Chandler
- Parent(s): Harry Chandler; Emma Marian Otis Chandler
- Relatives: Harrison Gray Otis (grandfather); Charles Abel Buffum (father-in-law); Mike Chandler (grandson)

Norman Chandler (September 14, 1899 – October 20, 1973) was the publisher of the Los Angeles Times from 1945 to 1960.

== Personal ==
Norman Chandler was born in Los Angeles on September 14, 1899, one of eight children of Harry Chandler and Marian Otis Chandler. His grandfather, Harrison Gray Otis, had been publisher of, the Los Angeles Times from 1881 to 1917, and his father from 1917 to 1944.

As a youth he was raised in his parents' estate on Hillhurst Avenue near the Greek Theater. He delivered copies of the Los Angeles Times in a model‐T Ford.

Chandler attended Hollywood High School, then Stanford University, where he was a member of Delta Kappa Epsilon fraternity (Sigma Rho chapter). While at Stanford, he met an athletic coed from Long Beach, who he married, Dorothy Buffum. They raised their two children, Mia and Otis Chandler on their suburban ranch in Sierra Madre. Through his later years, Chandler was a frequent visitor to the California Club, the Bohemian Grove, and his beach house in the Dana Strand Club in Dana Point, CA.

== The Los Angeles Times ==
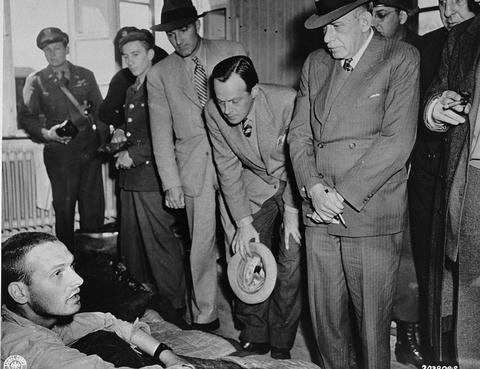
American newspaper editors speak with survivors at a hospital in the newly liberated Buchenwald concentration camp, April 1945. Left to right: Norman Chandler, Los Angeles Times; William I. Nichols (leaning forward, center), This Week magazine; and Julius Ochs Adler, The New York Times.

After dropping out of Stanford his senior year, Chandler started working at the Los Angeles Times on a seven-year training program under his father, Harry Chandler, who had been its publisher since 1917. Norman Chandler became general manager in 1936, president in 1941 and at his father’s death in 1944, the third publisher of the newspaper.

The Times prospered under Chandler, and gained regional, as well as national, prominence. In 1947 it became the largest-circulation newspaper in Los Angeles, and in 1961 the Sunday paper had a circulation of more than one million.

Seeking to create a community-like work environment, Chandler was one of the first newspaper employers to offer benefits to his employees, including health insurance and pension plans, and to foster community spirit.

Time magazine honored Chandler in 1957 by putting him on the cover.

“In the world today,” he said, “we are witnessing education and publishing rivaling the population explosion in dramatic growth. The necessities of life have always challenged man's ingenuity—now the distribution of knowledge has become the challenge of the age.”

Chandler retired as publisher in 1960, leaving the job to his thirty-year-old son Otis Chandler.

== Times Mirror Corporation ==
The parent company of the Los Angeles Times, started by Harrison Gray Otis, was the Times Mirror Company. Under Norman Chandler's leadership, Times Mirror grew with both acquisitions and internal growth, becoming the first family-owned newspaper company to go public.

After letting his son, Otis, take over as publisher of the Times, Norman Chandler remained as chairman of the board from 1961-1968. Over the objections of his conservative family, he succeeded in getting the corporation listed on the NYSE in 1964. He then used the public shares to continue his expansion and diversification of the company, acquiring New American Library book publishers in 1960; the book publisher World Publishing Company in 1962: C.V. Mosby Company (1967), which published medical college textbooks and reference books; Harry N. Abrams — a publisher of art and photography books (1966); legal publisher Matthew Bender; and air navigation publisher Jeppesen (1961).

The company also acquired more newspapers: Newsday, The Dallas Times Herald and The Orange Coast Pilot in Costa Mesa, Calif.

Chandler also brought Times-Mirror Company into broadcasting; Times Mirror was a founding owner of television station KTTV in Los Angeles, which opened in January 1949. It became that station's sole owner in 1951, after re-acquiring the minority shares it had sold to CBS in 1948. Times-Mirror also purchased a former motion picture studio, Nassour Studios, in Hollywood in 1950, which was then used to consolidate KTTV's operations. Later to be known as Metromedia Square (then the Fox Television Center), the studio was sold along with KTTV to Metromedia in 1963.

== Civic benefactor ==
He funded the construction of the Hollywood Palladium at a cost of $1.6 million in 1940. His wife, Dorothy Buffum Chandler, led Los Angeles' cultural revitalization in the 50s and 60s, first with the restoration of the Hollywood Bowl, then with the construction of the Los Angeles Music Center (the Dorothy Chandler Pavilion, Mark Taper Forum and the Ahmanson Theatre).
