= Yellowface I budgerigar mutation =

Genetic mutation affecting the colour of budgerigars

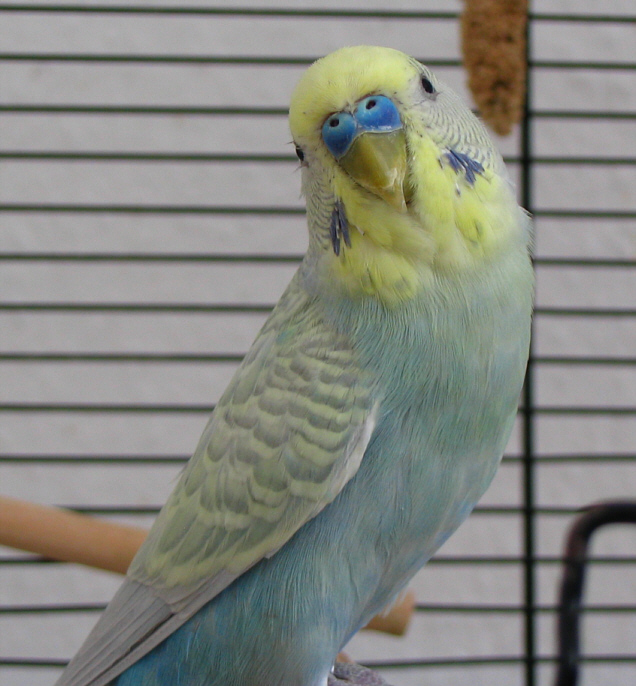
Yellowface I Greywing Skyblue cock Budgerigar

The Yellowface I budgerigar mutation is one of approximately 30 mutations affecting the colour of budgerigars.

== Appearance ==
The Yellowface I Skyblue variety is the same in appearance as a normal Skyblue except that the forehead and mask, which is white in the normal Skyblue, is replaced by bright yellow, the short tail feathers show yellow instead of the normal white, and the undulations on the wings are often faint yellow. The yellow on the mask tends to leak down onto the breast to a small degree, giving it a green tinge. In juvenile plumage the yellow is considerably fainter and does not appear on the forehead, which is barred in the usual way, nor does it leak onto the breast to as great an extent.

The Yellowface I Cobalt and Yellowface I Mauve varieties have similar yellow markings.

The appearance of birds with other combinations of the Yellowface I mutation is discussed under Genetics below.

== Historical notes ==
In the UK, a yellowfaced bird was first produced in 1934–1935 by E H Stevenson of Cambridge—a yellowfaced Cobalt cock, and Mrs G Lait of Grimsby and J Long of Gorleston-on-Sea both bred them in 1935. A contemporary report of these latter breedings says, "Mrs Lait mated a dark green cock to a greywing mauve hen, and in their third nest was a pale greywing mauve hen with a distinct (light lemon yellow) mask and bib, with the under tail feathers yellow and with yellow on the wings in the places where the normal blue bird is white. This hen ... was mated with a cobalt/white cock and they have produced five youngsters, all having yellow masks like their mother. Mr Long's birds were bred from a dark green of a somewhat olive shade mated to a rather unusually coloured hen, which appears to be a green but has a turquoise suffusion on the breast, etc. The first nest produced 3 cobalt birds with yellow masks, etc, like Mrs Lait's birds described above, and one green-blue bird like the mother. The second nest produced exactly the same result."

By 1937 several breeders in the UK had yellowfaced birds, and Stevenson and Tucker exhibited one at the Crystal Palace in that year. Yellowfaced birds were also being bred in Europe, as it was reported that W H Higham imported one in 1937, and in Australia. In all, there were at least seven reports of yellowfaced birds appearing between 1934 and 1937, seemingly independently. Some of these were very similar, others were slightly different. It is impossible to tell now which of the yellowface mutations were involved, but as some of the reports mentioned normal-looking birds which bred 100% yellowfaced young it seems likely that these at least were the Yellowface I mutation.

== Genetics ==
The genetics of the several Yellowface mutations and their relation to the Blue mutation are not yet fully and definitively understood.

Much confusion and misunderstanding have arisen because the popular names given to these mutations are misleading. These mutations do not generate a yellow face, as the names might suggest. Rather the action of all these mutations is to reduce the yellow pigmentation, either entirely or to some degree, with respect to the wild-type Light Green. Had these mutations been named 'Yellow-less' rather than 'Blue' or 'Yellowface' their action might have been more easily understood from the outset. But the traditional names are engrained and are retained here.

The prevailing view is that the Yellowface I mutation, together with the Yellowface II and Blue mutations, are members of an allelic series situated at the Blue locus. Although some breeders still dissent from this view it is the one followed here.

On its own, the Yellowface I is a simple autosomal recessive with respect to the wild-type. Visibly, its action appears to be identical to that of the Blue mutation. The heterozygote or Light Green/yellowface I with one Yellowface I allele and one wild-type allele is visibly indistinguishable from a Light Green, and the homozygote with two Yellowface I alleles is visibly indistinguishable from a Skyblue. Due to this similarity in the action of the Blue and Yellowface I mutations, Bergman and Onsman have adopted the convention that these mutations be named Blue I and Blue II.

The Yellowface I Skyblue variety, described in Appearance above, is a composite of the Blue and Yellowface I mutations, having one allele of each. When two Yellowface I Skyblues are paired together, half the progeny will be Yellowface I Skyblues and half will be normal Skyblues in appearance. But half of these apparent Skyblues will, in fact, be double factor Yellowface I's.

The loci of the Dark budgerigar mutation and the Blue allelic series are situated on the same autosome, so the Dark mutation is linked to the Blue allelic series (see genetic linkage). The cross-over value (COV) or recombination frequency between the Dark and Blue loci is commonly stated to be about 14%, but some experiments have found much smaller values (see Genetics in the Dark budgerigar mutation).
