= Mazda GTP =

Mazda RX-7 GTP Mazda GTP
- Category: IMSA GTX/IMSA GTP
- Constructor: Mazda
- Designer(s): Pierre Honegger
- Successor: Denali Speedcar; Badger BB

Technical specifications
- Engine: Mazda 13B 1,308 cc (79.8 cu in), twin-rotor Wankel rotary, front engined

Competition history
- Notable entrants: Z&W Motorsports
- Debut: RX-7 GTP: 1981 24 Hours of Daytona; GTP: 1983 24 Hours of Daytona
Races	Wins
RX-7 GTP: 2 GTP: 15 (20 entries)	RX-7 GTP: 0 GTP: 0

The Mazda GTP is an IMSA GTP race car that was built by Pierre Honegger in 1981. Based on a Mazda RX-7, the car initially competed in the GTX category as the Mazda RX-7 GTP, before it was rebuilt for the IMSA GTP category in 1983. Throughout its career, the car used a Mazda 13B Wankel rotary engine, similar to that used in the production RX-7s. Although the rotary-engined sports prototypes generally had a reputation of being very reliable, the Mazda GTP frequently failed to finish races, and was never able to better the eighth place achieved at the 1983 24 Hours of Daytona. In 1986, one car was purchased by Erie Scientific Racing, and rebuilt to become the Badger BB. This car was no more successful or reliable than its predecessor, and was last used in 1989, by which point it was owned by Jack Engelhardt. The other car, meanwhile, was rebuilt by Honegger into the Denali Speedcar, which was used with moderate success in 1986 and 1987.

== Racing history ==
=== 1981 ===
In 1981, Pierre Honegger rebuilt a production Mazda RX-7 for use in the GTX category of the IMSA GT Championship. The new car was named the Mazda RX-7 GTP, and featured new, wide-body bodywork, whilst using a more powerful version of the Mazda 13B Wankel rotary engine used in the road car. Two cars were built, and both were entered in that year's 24 Hours of Daytona. Honegger partnered Pierre Dieudonné and Ernesto Soto in one car, whilst Jean-Paul Libert, Hervé Regout and Jean Xhenceval were entered in the other car; however, neither trio managed to qualify for the race. Honegger and Soto then entered the 12 Hours of Sebring, but withdrew the car prior to the start of the event. Instead, he drove with Dieudonné and Libert in a conventional Mazda RX-7, and finished 61st (20th in the GTU category), having run out of fuel after 60 laps.

=== 1983 ===
Having not used the RX-7 GTP again in either 1981 or 1982, Honegger rebuilt the car for the IMSA GTP category in 1981, and rechristened it as the Mazda GTP. The Mazda GTP made its debut at the 1983 24 Hours of Daytona, where the trio of Honegger, Walt Bohren and David Palmer finished a respectable eighth, and fifth in their class. Bohren then drove the car at the Grand Prix of Miami, but retired after four laps, and was classified 31st. Honegger and Bohren were no more successful at the 12 Hours of Sebring, where the car's engine blew after 61 laps, and restricted them to 66th overall. The Mazda GTP wasn't used again for another five rounds, before Bohren retired again at the Lime Rock Grand Prix; this time, he had lasted 75 laps, and was classified 32nd overall, and seventh in class. After this, it would be another eight rounds before the Mazda GTP was entered again; this was the Grand Prix of Pocono, where Honegger and Bohren retired once more. However, the duo had completed 143 laps; this was enough for them to be classified 15th overall, and fourth in class. Honegger partnered David Loring at the Daytona Finale, but another retirement followed; this time after 64 laps, restricting them to 45th overall.

=== 1984 ===
Honegger opted to drive alongside Loring and David Weitzenhof at the 1984 24 Hours of Daytona, but they crashed out after 187 laps, and were classified 54th overall, and 21st in the GTP category. The Mazda GTP then remained unused until the Lime Rock Grand Prix seven rounds later, where Honegger was able to finish the race, albeit five laps down on the winner, and in ninth place. At the 6 Hours of Watkins Glen, Loring drove alongside Frank Jellinek, and was able to finish in tenth overall, and eighth in class. The upturn in reliability continued at the Road America 500, where Jellinek, Loring and Honegger finished 13th overall, and eleventh in class. The final race of the season for the Mazda GTP came at the Grand Prix at Pocono, where Honegger and Loring finished 15th overall, and tenth in the GTP category.

=== 1985 ===
Although Honegger attempted to run himself and Loring in the eighth and ninth round of the IMSA GT Championship in 1985, it would not be until the tenth round, which was the Watkins Glen Grand Prix, before the Mazda GTP ran again. Loring was the sole driver, but retired after 27 laps, and could do no better than 18th. After another break of four races, Loring and Honegger entered the Grand Prix at Pocono, and were able to take tenth overall, and second in the GTP Lights category. Loring could not repeat this success in the next round, which was the New York 500; he retired after 45 laps, and was classified in 36th overall. The final Mazda GTP entry of the 1985 season came at the Columbus 500, where Loring retired once more; this time, he managed 84 laps, and was classified 14th. This was also the Mazda GTP's last ever race, as two entries in 1986 led to nothing.

=== Later career ===
Although the Mazda GTP would never race again, one chassis was purchased by Erie Scientific Racing, and rebuilt to become the Badger BB. This car made its debut in the hands of Jellinek and John Grooms at the 1986 Road America 500, where they finished 18th overall, and eighth in the GTP Lights category. This car's best ever finish would come at the 1987 24 Hours of Daytona, where Grooms, Jellinek, Tom Bagley and Augie Pabst took 14th overall, and third in class. Honegger, however, retained the other chassis, and rebuilt it into the Denali Speedcar. This car debuted at the 1986 Lime Rock Grand Prix, where Loring finished ninth overall, and won the GTP Lights category. Loring would also secure the Speedcar's best ever finish at the 1987 Watkins Glen Grand Prix, where he finished fifth overall, and third in class.
