= Yellowface II budgerigar mutation =

Genetic mutation affecting the colour of budgerigars

The Yellowface II budgerigar mutation is one of approximately 30 mutations affecting the colour of budgerigars. In combination with the Blue, Opaline and Clearwing mutations, the single factor Yellowface II mutation produces the variety called Rainbow.

== Appearance ==
The single factor (SF) Yellowface II Skyblue variety is like a normal Light Green but has a very bright body colour midway between blue and green — a shade often called sea-green or turquoise. The body feathers of the SF Yellowface II Cobalt are bottle-green and in the SF Yellowface II Mauve they are a mixture of mauve and olive.

The double factor (DF) Yellowface II Skyblue variety is very similar to the Yellowface I Skyblue, but the yellow pigmentation is brighter, and tends to leak into the body feathers to a greater extent.

== Historical notes ==
Although not recognised as such at the time, it is possible that the first Yellowface II birds to be reported in the UK were bred by Jack Long of Gorleston-on-Sea in 1935. A contemporary report of his breeding says, "Mrs Lait mated a dark green cock to a greywing mauve hen, and in their third nest was a pale greywing mauve hen with a distinct (light lemon yellow) mask and bib, with the under tail feathers yellow and with yellow on the wings in the places where the normal blue bird is white. This hen ... was mated with a cobalt/white cock and they have produced five youngsters, all having yellow masks like their mother. Mr Long's birds were bred from a dark green of a somewhat olive shade mated to a rather unusually coloured hen, which appears to be a green but has a turquoise suffusion on the breast, etc. The first nest produced 3 cobalt birds with yellow masks, etc, like Mrs Lait's birds described above, and one green-blue bird like the mother. The second nest produced exactly the same result."

The description of the birds suggests that Mr Long's birds were a DF Yellowface II Cobalt cock and a SF Yellowface II Cobalt hen, but the breeding of Cobalts with yellow masks places this in doubt.

== Genetics ==
The genetics of the several Yellowface mutations and their relation to the Blue mutation are not yet fully and definitively understood.

Much confusion and misunderstanding have arisen because the popular names given to these mutations are misleading. These mutations do not generate a yellow face, as the names might suggest. Rather the action of all these mutations is to reduce the yellow pigmentation, either entirely or to some degree, with respect to the wild-type Light Green. Had these mutations been named 'Yellow-less' rather than 'Blue' or 'Yellowface' their action might have been more easily understood from the outset. But the traditional names are engrained and are retained here.

The prevailing view is that the Yellowface II mutation, together with the Yellowface I and Blue mutations, are members of an allelic series situated at the Blue locus. Although some breeders still dissent from this view it is the one followed here.

On its own, the Yellowface II is a simple autosomal recessive with respect to the wild-type. Visibly, its action appears to be similar to that of the Blue mutation. The heterozygote or Light Green/yellowface II with one Yellowface II allele and one wild-type allele is visibly indistinguishable from a Light Green, and the homozygote with two Yellowface II alleles is like a Skyblue with a variable green suffusion on the breast.

The SF Yellowface II Skyblue variety, described in Appearance above, is a composite of the Blue and Yellowface II mutations, having one allele of each.

The loci of the Dark budgerigar mutation and the Blue allelic series are situated on the same autosome, so the Dark mutation is linked to the Blue allelic series (see genetic linkage). The cross-over value (COV) or recombination frequency between the Dark and Blue loci is commonly stated to be about 14%, but some experiments have found much smaller values (see Genetics in the Dark budgerigar mutation).
