= Violet budgerigar mutation =

Mutation affecting the colour of a budgerigar

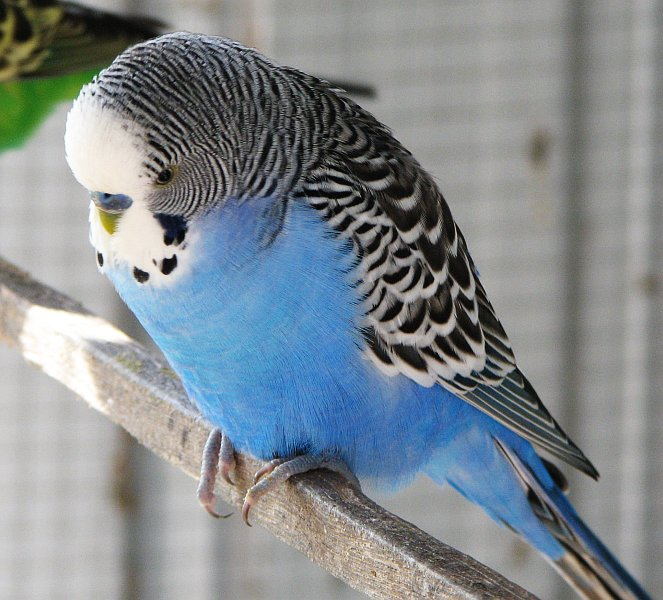
Violet sky blue mutation

The violet budgerigar mutation is one of approximately 30 mutations affecting the colour of budgerigars. It is one of the constituent mutations of the violet variety.

== Appearance ==
Variety	Pantone colour
Skyblue	310
Cobalt	2915
Mauve	535
Violet	2727

The violet factor produces a visual effect in any bird which carries it. The effect depends on whether the violet factor is single or double and whether the dark and blue mutations are present. In total there are 18 visually different combinations of these three mutations. However, only three of these approximate to the colour specified by the visual violet exhibition standard.

The World Budgerigar Organisation has established precise standards for certain budgerigar body colours using Pantone colour numbers, as shown in the table.

=== Green series ===
SF violet light greens have contour features similar in shade to a dark green, but the faint ribbing present in the body feathers of a dark green is lacking, giving the feathers of the violet light greens a more satin-like finish. The tail feathers are paler than the navy blue of the dark green, rather like those of the light green, particularly near the quill end, and violet light greens lack the dark blue colour present in the flight feathers of dark greens.

SF violet dark greens have a body color midway between dark green and dark grey.

SF violet olives are very similar to olives.

DF violet light greens, dark greens, and olives are expected to be slightly darker than the corresponding SF birds, but these colours have not been reported reliably.

=== Blue series ===
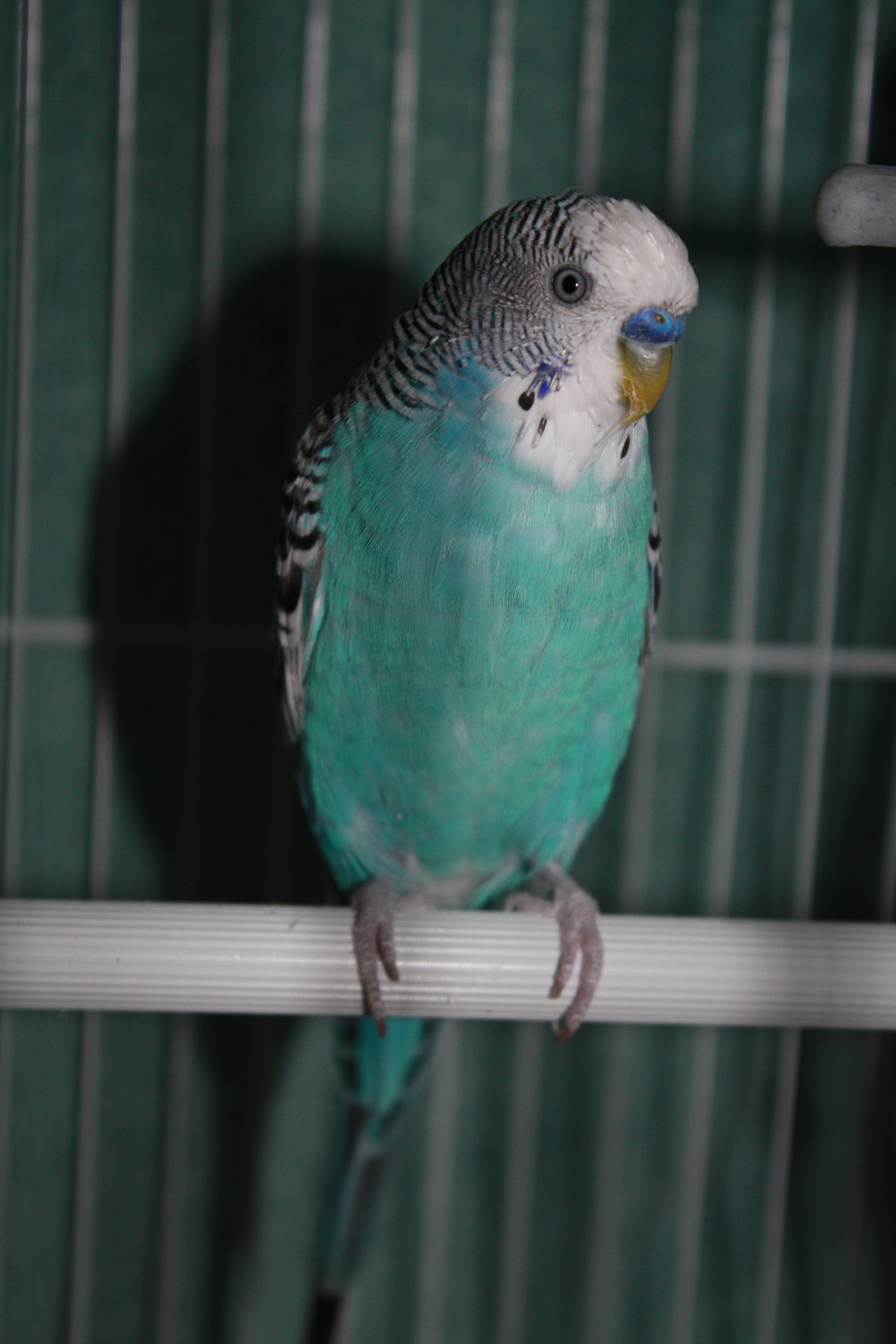
Skyblue mutation

SF violet skyblues have a body colour ranging from dark skyblue to medium cobalt. Most look rather like pale cobalts. The colour of the tail and flight feathers are the most reliable distinguishing features. Cobalts have navy blue tails throughout their length, while Violet Skyblues have tails, which shade to turquoise at the quill end. The flight feathers of Cobalts are dark blue, those of violet skyblues have a glossy turquoise iridescence rather like those of skyblues but slightly darker.

SF violet cobalts have a bright violet body colour and are known as visual violets.

SF violet mauves are quite similar in appearance to normal mauves. Sometimes a violet tinge is visible in violet mauves when placed next to a mauve, particularly in the rump area.

DF violet skyblues are similar in shade to SF violet cobalts but are a deeper richer violet colour. These, too, are visual violets. Their tails are dark blue with a residual pale blue or turquoise at the quill end, whereas SF violet cobalts have uniform dark blue-violet tails.

DF violet cobalts are similar to SF violet cobalts but usually have a deeper richer violet colour. These are also visual violets.

DF violet mauves are believed to be similar in colour to SF violet mauves.

== Historical notes ==
In Australia, A Burton of Sydney was breeding Violets by 1934 and Mr Harold Pier exhibited a violet in the same year.

In Europe, the first mention of a bird which might have been a visual violet was by C af Enehjelm in 1935 in Copenhagen. In a letter to the Budgerigar Bulletin, he said he had bred a Cobalt, "which I would call violet". In a later article he gave full details of his violet birds, remarking that earlier birds he had seen which were bred in Germany in the late 1920s and marketed as violets were little different from normal Cobalts and lost their violet colour with age. His first true violet, mentioned above, was bred from an apparent dark green/blue cock obtained from a friend and a cobalt hen. This dark Green/blue cock was "very heavily suffused with blue (cobalt)". Presumably, it was in fact a SF Violet Light Green/blue. He went on to breed several more Violets from the progeny of this bird.

In 1924, in England, and 1932, in Australia, birds called "Royal Blues" were bred, but these were not Violets. In the UK the opinion of the highly respected budgerigar breeder, C H Rogers, writing in 1937, was that a true violet was first seen in England at the Cambridge Diploma Show that year. The Violet hen was exhibited by Stevenson and Tucker. As they had eight other birds of the same colour they must have first bred Violets some years earlier.

As Violet Light Greens are very similar in appearance to dark greens it seems likely that a small number of Violet Light Greens were being bred in several places in the 1920s, masquerading as Dark Greens. Their true nature remained hidden, only being revealed when they were mated to birds of the blue series. This could not happen until blue budgerigars became readily available, which was not until the 1930s.

== Genetics ==
The Violet mutation has an incompletely dominant relationship to its wild-type allele. That is, there are three distinct phenotypes, possessing zero (the wild type), one (the single factor heterozygote) and two (the double factor homozygote) Violet alleles, with the heterozygote having an intermediate appearance between the wild-type and the homozygote.

Because the Violet factor is always visibly expressed no budgerigar can be split for Violet. The heterozygotes of Violet—the SF Violet Greens and Blues—correspond to the splits of the recessive mutations.

The violet mutation is autosomal, but it has not yet been determined whether there is a linkage to any of the other budgerigar mutations. There has been a long-held view that the violet mutation was linked to the blue and dark mutations, but this is now uncertain. It seems more likely that the unexpected breeding results which prompted the view were caused by incorrectly identifying birds carrying single and double violet factors. There is no reported measurement of this or any other linkage.

In the past, there was a view that the violet allele was lethal in double factor form, but this is now disproved with many breeders reporting DF violets.
