= Otis Chandler =

American newspaper publisher

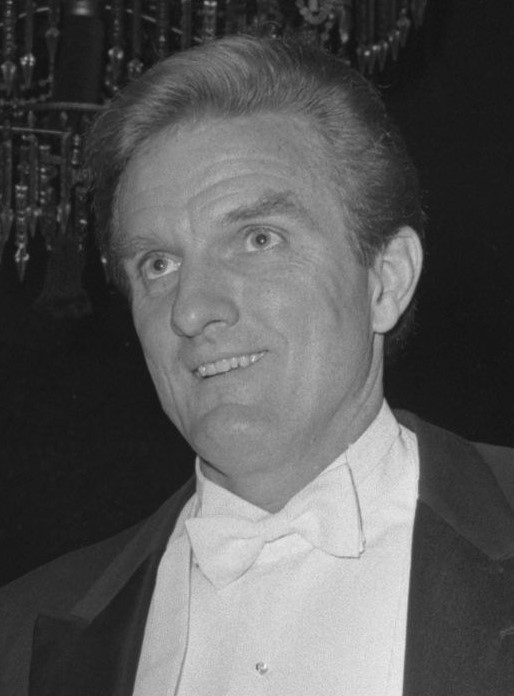
- Chandler in 1972
- Born: November 23, 1927; Los Angeles, California, U.S.
- Died: February 27, 2006 (aged 78); Ojai, California, U.S.
- Education: Stanford University
- Occupation: Publisher
- Spouse(s): Marilyn "Missy" Chandler, nee Brant (June 1951–July 1981) Bettina Chandler, nee Whitaker (August 1981–February 2006, his death)
- Children: 5, including Mike Chandler
- Parent(s): Dorothy Buffum Chandler; Norman Chandler
- Relatives: Charles Abel Buffum (grandfather); Harrison Gray Otis (great-grandfather); Eliza Ann Otis (great-grandmother); Marian Otis Chandler (grandmother)

Otis Chandler (November 23, 1927 – February 27, 2006) was the publisher of the Los Angeles Times between 1960 and 1980, leading a large expansion of the newspaper and its ambitions. He was the fourth and final member of the Chandler family to hold the paper's top position.

Chandler made improvement of the paper's quality a top priority, succeeding in raising the product's reputation, as well as its profit margins. "No publisher in America improved a paper so quickly on so grand a scale, took a paper that was marginal in qualities and brought it to excellence as Otis Chandler did," journalist David Halberstam wrote in his history of the company.

== Family pedigree ==
Chandler's family owned a stake in the newspaper since his great-grandfather Harrison Gray Otis joined the company in 1882, the year after the Los Angeles Daily Times began publication. He was the son of Norman Chandler, his predecessor as publisher, and Dorothy Buffum Chandler, a patron of the arts and a Regent of the University of California. His grandfather, Charles Abel Buffum, was a businessman who founded Buffum's, a department store chain, with his brother, Edwin E. Buffum, and a politician, who served as Mayor of Long Beach, California.

Chandler was raised to share his family's distaste for labor unions, a tradition that favored the family's financial interests. As a child, each year his parents held a memorial for the 1910 Los Angeles Times bombing, linked to political agitators, that killed 20 Times workers. "I was raised to hate the unions", Chandler said.

"Oats" was Chandler's nickname within the family.

Times editorial page editor Anthony Day observed that Chandler "had been raised to be a prince". Later, Chandler said his motivation to invest in The Times' quality could be attributed, at least in part, to his desire to combat the East Coast opinion that, "The Times was regarded as a bad newspaper from a hick town". Chandler attributed his pursuit of solo athletics like shotputting and weightlifting to the same sources, saying, "No one could say that the team carried me or that the coach put me in because my name was Chandler".

== Youth ==
=== Childhood ===
Chandler was raised on a 10-acre (40,000 m^{2}) citrus ranch in Sierra Madre owned by his parents. Despite his family's wealth, Chandler's father insisted that he perform field labor and did not spoil him with gifts. There Chandler spent much of his time alone, later in life unable to name a single childhood friend. At the age of 8, Chandler was thrown to the ground during a horseback riding lesson. His mother rushed him to a hospital, where doctors initially reported he was dead. His mother rushed him to a second hospital, where a doctor she knew revived him with an adrenaline shot to the heart.

=== Education and athletics ===
Chandler first attended the Polytechnic School in Pasadena, often making his commute by bicycle. Later he would briefly attend the Cate School boarding school in Carpinteria before his parents elected to send him east to attend Phillips Academy in Andover, Massachusetts. At the time he enrolled at Phillips, Chandler weighed 155 pounds. As a student he competed in basketball, soccer, the high jump, running and weightlifting. By the time of graduation, he weighed 200 pounds.

Chandler enrolled at his parents' alma mater, Stanford University, in 1946. Like his father, he was a member of Delta Kappa Epsilon fraternity (Sigma Rho chapter). At Stanford he was a successful shot putter. He broke the freshman school record with a toss of 48 feet (15 m), 761/47 inches. At 6-foot 3-inches (190 cm) tall, after bulking-up to and 220 pounds he won the Pacific Coast Conference title and finished second in the nation during his senior year with a toss of 57 feet (17 m), 63/47 of an inch while serving as his team's captain. As a weightlifter, Chandler finished third in the nation competing in the heavyweight division.

A sprained wrist kept him from competing as a shot putter for the United States in the 1952 Summer Olympics.

=== Early adulthood ===
After graduation, Chandler tried to enroll in an Air Force training program, but was turned down because he was too large to fit in the cockpit of a jet. Instead, he spent 1951 to 1953 in the Air Force's ground service, as a co-captain of the track team and supervisor of athletics and drama at Camp Stoneman in Pittsburg, California.

On his 23rd birthday, Chandler proposed to his college sweetheart, Marilyn Brant, on the seventh hole of the Pebble Beach golf course. Their first child was a boy named Norman after Chandler's father.

=== Preparation for power ===
Chandler visited The Times frequently as a child, sliding down chutes that were used to drop papers to delivery trucks. While in college, he sometimes worked summers at the paper, most often moving printing plates and other heavy equipment. Despite that, Chandler did not envision journalism as a career during his youth; instead, he often said he would like to become a doctor.

After leaving the Air Force in 1953, he had little direction for his career. When he arrived at his parents' home with his wife and first child, his father presented him with credentials for a seven-year executive training program at The Times. He started work right away as a pressroom apprentice on the graveyard shift. The pay was $48 a week. His father made sure that Chandler experienced work in all sections of the organization, assigning him to jobs in the industrial production of the paper, business management, clerical administration, and the news-gathering operation.

== Professional career ==
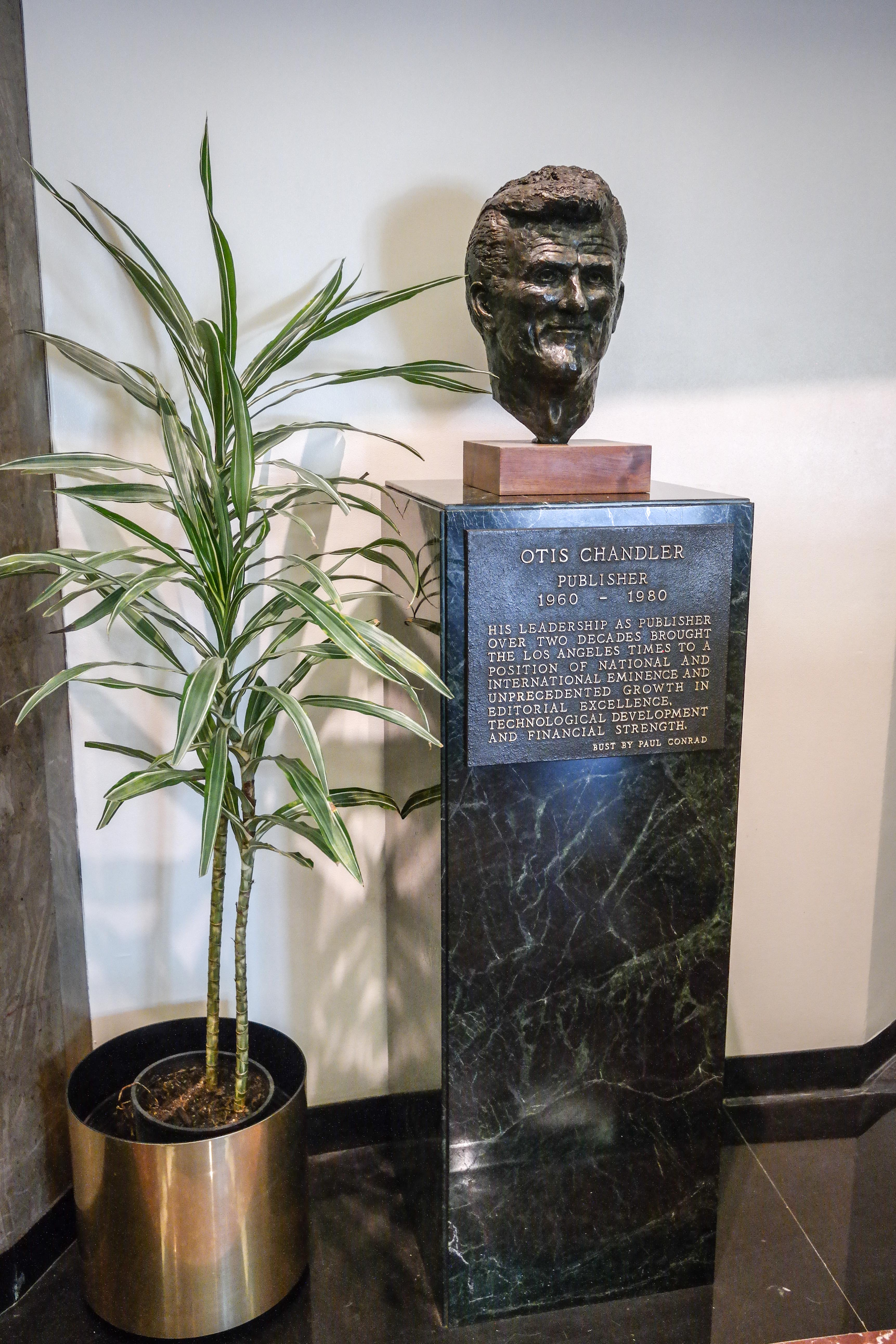
A bust of Otis Chandler in the lobby of the former Los Angeles Times Building, 2014.

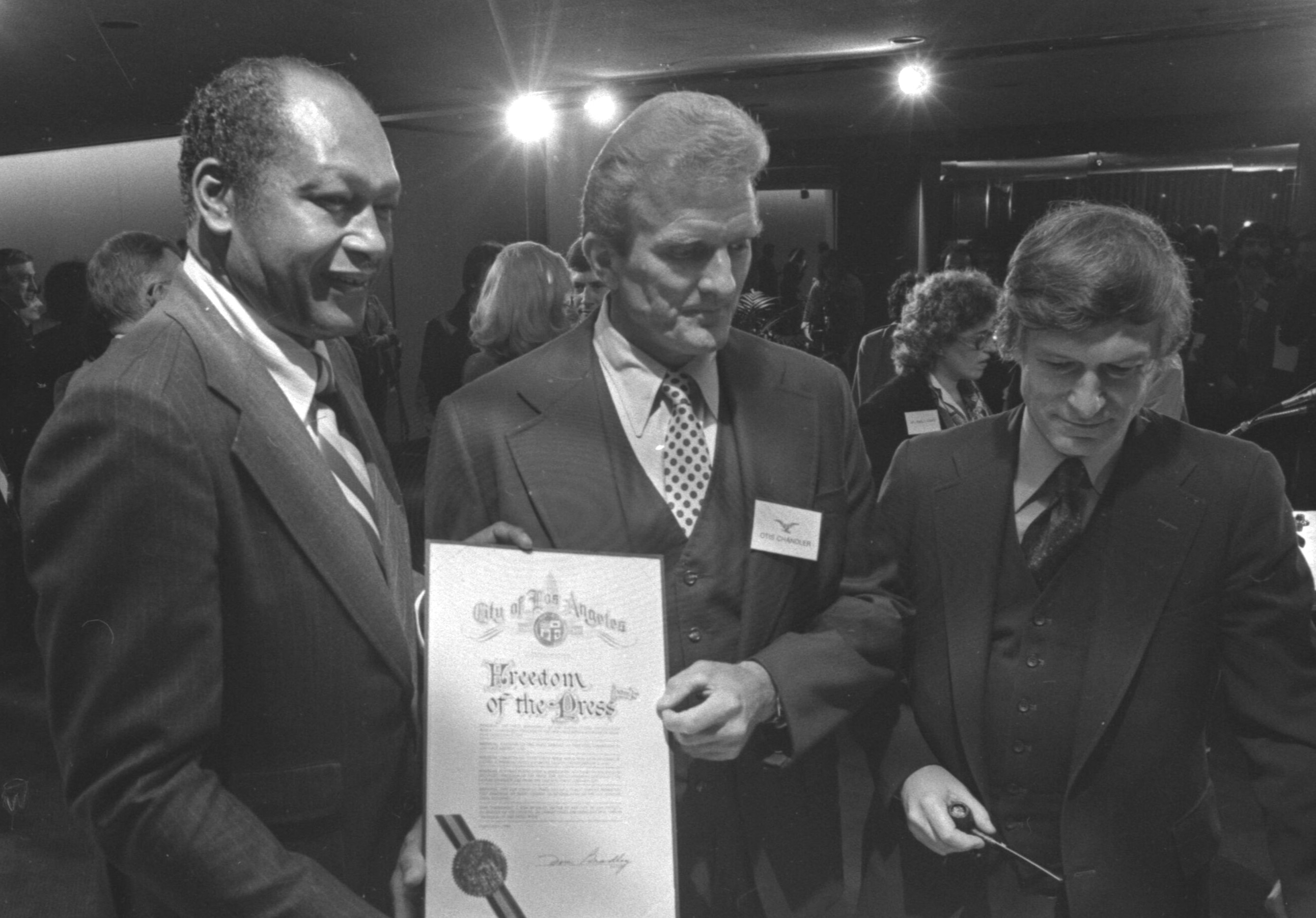
Chandler with Mayor Tom Bradley and Hugh Hefner, 1980.

In 1960, he became publisher of the Los Angeles Times. He quickly increased the budget of the paper, allowing it to expand its coverage. This coincided with the shift of the paper's editorial stance from overtly conservative to independent. Under Otis Chandler, The Times became a critically lauded newspaper.

When Chandler took the job, the paper had only two outside offices. During his tenure it would expand to 34 foreign and domestic bureaus.

In 1966 Chandler received the Elijah Parish Lovejoy Award as well as an honorary Doctor of Laws degree from Colby College. Chandler retired as publisher in 1980 at the age of 52 to become chairman of Times Mirror, reducing his involvement in the day-to-day operations of the company. The decision stunned the staff and outside observers, many of whom expected him to serve much longer.

In 1986, Chandler won the Walter Cronkite Award for Excellence in Journalism to honor his years of service to the newspaper.

He handed control of the paper to people outside the family in the mid-1980s and threw himself into other interests such as the Chandler Vintage Museum of Transportation and Wildlife in Oxnard, California, which he founded in 1987 (It was regularly open to the public, primarily as a fundraiser for charities, including the Oxnard Police Activities League).

== Retirement ==
Chandler re-entered the public eye in 1999 when he publicly criticized the LA Times for creating a special issue of its Sunday magazine dedicated to the new Staples Center in downtown LA when the paper shared a financial interest in the property. The paper's Sunday magazine on October 10, 1999, was a special issue dedicated to the new Staples Center sports arena in downtown L.A., home to the Lakers, Clippers and Kings. Such special issues were financial windfalls for the Times, generating a record $2 million in ad revenue. But as one of the arena's 10 "founding partners", the paper had agreed to share the issue's ad revenue with the Staples Center without telling its reporters or readers about the fiscal arrangement. Chandler, who had retired 19 years prior, sent his message directly to reporters, to the dismay of the newspaper's management. His successors, he said, had been "unbelievably stupid" and caused "the most serious single threat to the future" of the paper his family had bought in 1882 for this dangerous compromise of the paper's objectivity.

He was not involved in negotiations by other members of the Chandler family to sell The Times to Tribune Company, a clear sign of how his influence had eroded. Regardless, Chandler welcomed the outcome, largely because of his dissatisfaction with the existing management of Times-Mirror.

Chandler died at his home in Ojai at the age of 78 due to the effects of Lewy body disease, seven months after his diagnosis. Chandler had had earlier problems with his health, suffering from prostate cancer in 1989 and a 1998 heart attack.

== Recreation ==
Chandler was an enthusiastic athlete and thrill seeker, an image he actively cultivated. He was featured on the cover of sporting magazines like Road & Track, Strength and Health, and Safari Club. When photographed for the cover of the literary magazine Atlantic Monthly he was depicted on a surfboard crafted from newspapers across a wave of dollar bills.

On a 1964 safari in Mozambique, an elephant charged his party. After the guide missed his shot and fled, Chandler shot the elephant when it was only 10 yards away, preventing himself and his wife from being trampled.

In 1990, Chandler was trampled by a musk ox in the Northwest Territories of Canada. He was airlifted to a hospital. Doctors estimated that his dislocated right arm would never fully heal, but, citing a disciplined training regimen, Chandler claimed to regain virtually all use. In 1995, at age 68, he crashed his motorcycle into a tractor while in New Zealand. He lost part of the big toe on his left foot, saw another toe severely damaged and the rest of the foot became largely numb.

In 1998, at age 71, Chandler suffered minor head injuries when he spun out a Ferrari automobile on the road in Oxnard.

His son, Mike Chandler, was a race-car driver in the CART Championship Car series. Otis enthusiastically supported Michael's racing career until a near-fatal crash while qualifying at Indianapolis in 1984.
