= Blue budgerigar mutation =

Mutation affecting the colour of budgerigars

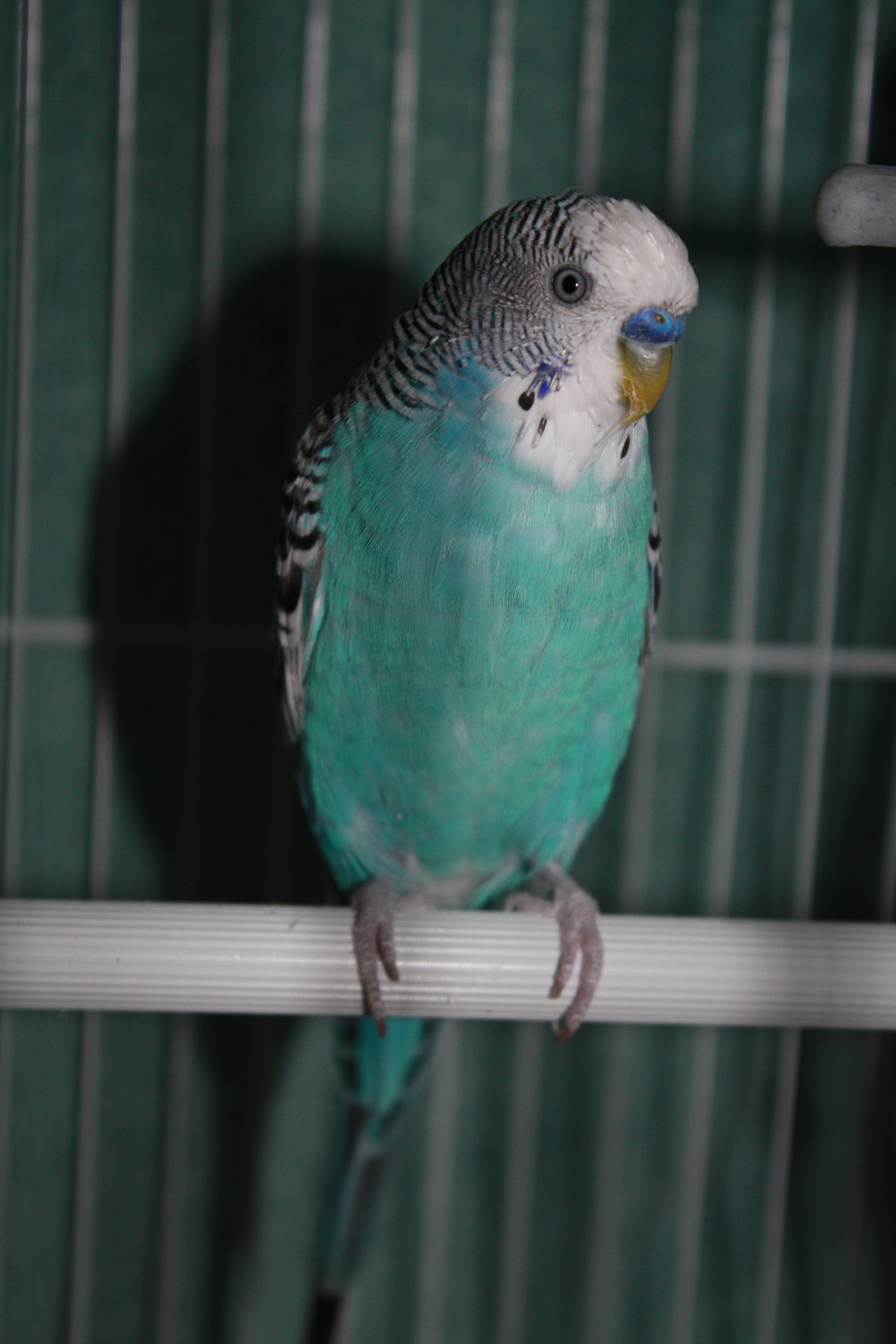
A sky blue budgerigar

The Blue budgerigar mutation is one of approximately 30 mutations affecting the colour of budgerigars. It is part of the genetic constitution of the following recognised varieties: Skyblue, Cobalt, Mauve and Violet.

== Appearance ==
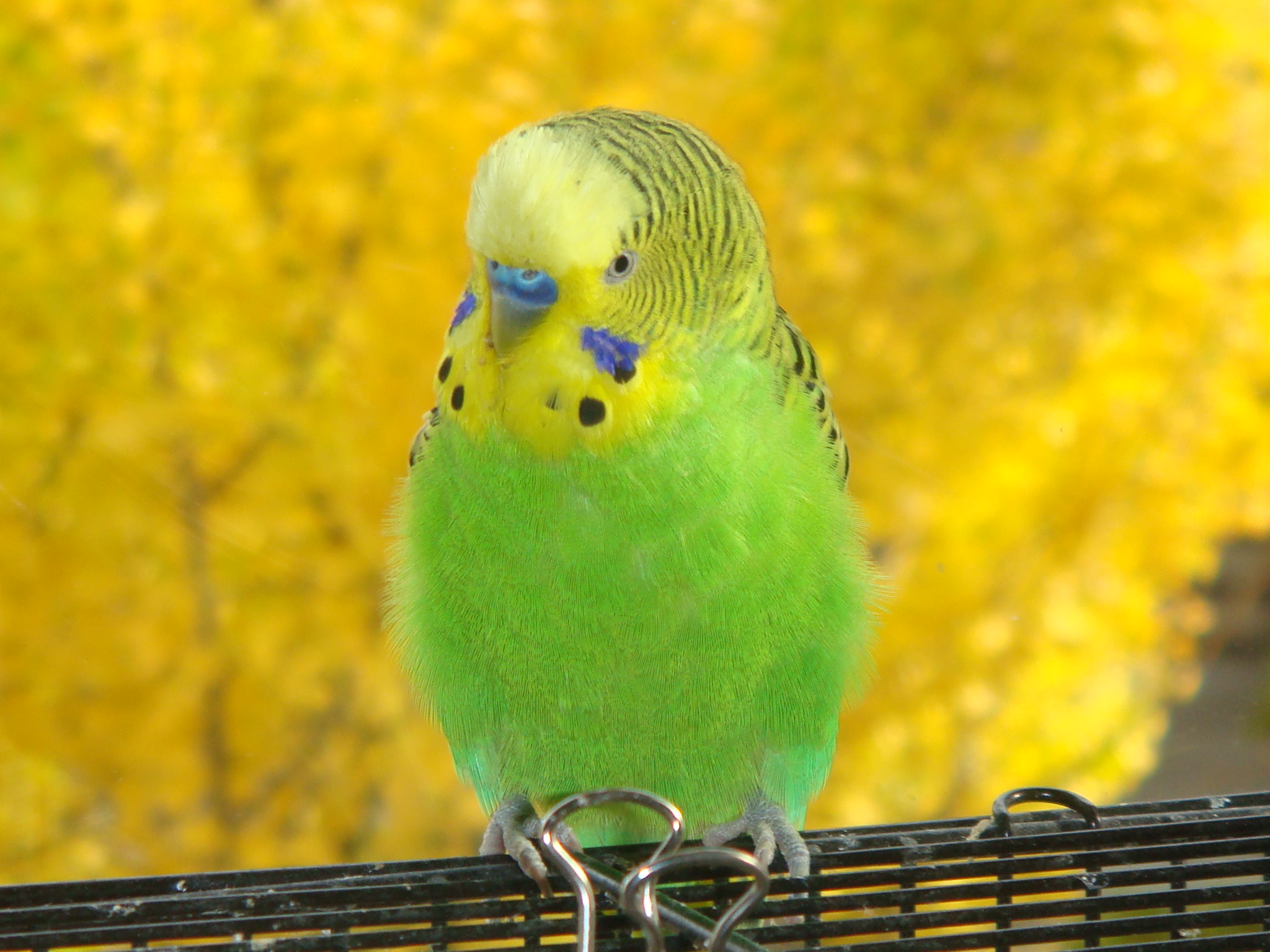
Light green colouring of a wild-type budgerigar

The Blue mutation changes the colour of the body feathers, which are light green in the wild-type, to skyblue and the colour of mask and other parts which are yellow in the wild-type, to white. In the domesticated bird this mutation changes the Light Green variety into the Skyblue variety, the Dark Green into the Cobalt and the Olive into the Mauve.

The green colouration of the wild budgerigar is due to the combined effect of a yellow pigment and an interference effect similar to that which gives colour to petrol on water, which in the budgerigar produces a blue colouration. Yellow pigment is present in the outer layer (cortex) of the cells forming the barbs of all feathers of the wild budgerigar with the exception of the cheek patches, although it is very weak in the outermost flight feathers. The distribution of the yellow pigment is clearly shown in the Lutino. The Blue mutation totally inhibits the production of this yellow pigment, and as far as is known, it has no other effect.

The yellow pigment in young budgerigars is paler than in adults, which makes green budgerigars in nest feather appear duller and Lutinos appear paler. A brighter and stronger yellow colouration appears after the first moult.

Variety	Pantone colour
Light Green	375
Skyblue	310
Cobalt	2915
Mauve	535
Violet	2727

Parrot feathers contain red, orange, and yellow polyene pigments called psittacofulvins. Genome-wide association mapping and gene-expression analysis mapped the Mendelian blue locus, which abolishes yellow pigmentation in the budgerigar. The blue trait maps to a single amino acid substitution (R644W) in an uncharacterized polyketide synthase (MuPKS) gene. When the MuPKS gene is expressed in yeast, yellow pigments accumulated. Mass spectrometry confirmed the yellow pigments matched those in feathers. The R644W substitution abolished MuPKS gene activity. Furthermore, gene-expression data from feathers of different bird species suggest that parrots acquired their colors through regulatory changes that drive high expression of the MuPKS gene in feather epithelia. This formulates biochemical models that explain natural colour variation in parrots.

The Blue mutation provides a widely accepted division of domesticated budgerigars into two colour classes: the "Green series" and the "Blue series". Birds of the Green series exhibit yellow pigmentation, while birds of the Blue series lack yellow pigmentation. These names can be misleading, since some birds belonging to the Blue series, such as Albinos, are not blue; similarly, Lutinos belong to the Green series, yet are not green.

In combination with the Dark budgerigar mutation the body feathers become deeper shades of blue. A blue budgerigar with a single Dark factor is called a Cobalt, and one with two Dark factors a Mauve. The World Budgerigar Organisation has established precise standards for certain budgerigar body colours using Pantone colour numbers, as shown in the table.

== Historical notes ==
The Blue mutation made its first recorded appearance in 1878 in the aviaries of M Limbosch of Uccle, a suburb of Brussels, but this strain died out, it is believed, in 1881. Blues appeared independently in the Netherlands between 1881 and 1885, and a Mr Pauwels of Everberg, near Brussels, reintroduced them to Belgium from this Dutch strain.

The first Blues to be seen in England were some exhibited by Messrs Millsum and Pauwels at the Horticultural Hall in 1910 and the Crystal Palace in 1911. Mr D Astley owned Blues in 1911, and it is recorded that C Pelham Sutton of Putney bred a Blue in 1912.

Blues remained quite rare until the 1930s, fetching up to £100 per pair in Japan around 1928, about the cost of a car at the time.

== Genetics ==
The Blue mutation is recessive to its wild-type allele, so a bird possessing a single Blue allele (the heterozygote) is identical in appearance to the wild-type light green. That is, the presence of a single wild-type allele is sufficient to permit the full production of the yellow psittacin pigment. Among the budgerigar fancy such a bird is said to be a Light Green split blue, usually written Light Green/blue. In a bird which has two Blue alleles (the homozygote), the lack of the wild-type allele means the yellow pigment can no longer be produced, and so the body colour is blue—the Skyblue.

The locus of the Blue gene is situated on one of the autosomal chromosomes. The Yellowface Blue I mutation, the Yellowface II mutation form an autosomal co-dominant series of alleles with the Blue mutation.

The loci of the Dark budgerigar mutation and the Blue allelic series are situated on the same autosome, so the Dark mutation is linked to the Blue allelic series (see genetic linkage). The cross-over value (COV) or recombination frequency between the Dark and Blue loci is commonly stated to be about 14%, but some experiments have found much smaller values (see Genetics section in the Dark budgerigar mutation).
