= Dorothy Buffum Chandler =

American cultural leader (1901–97)

Dorothy Chandler
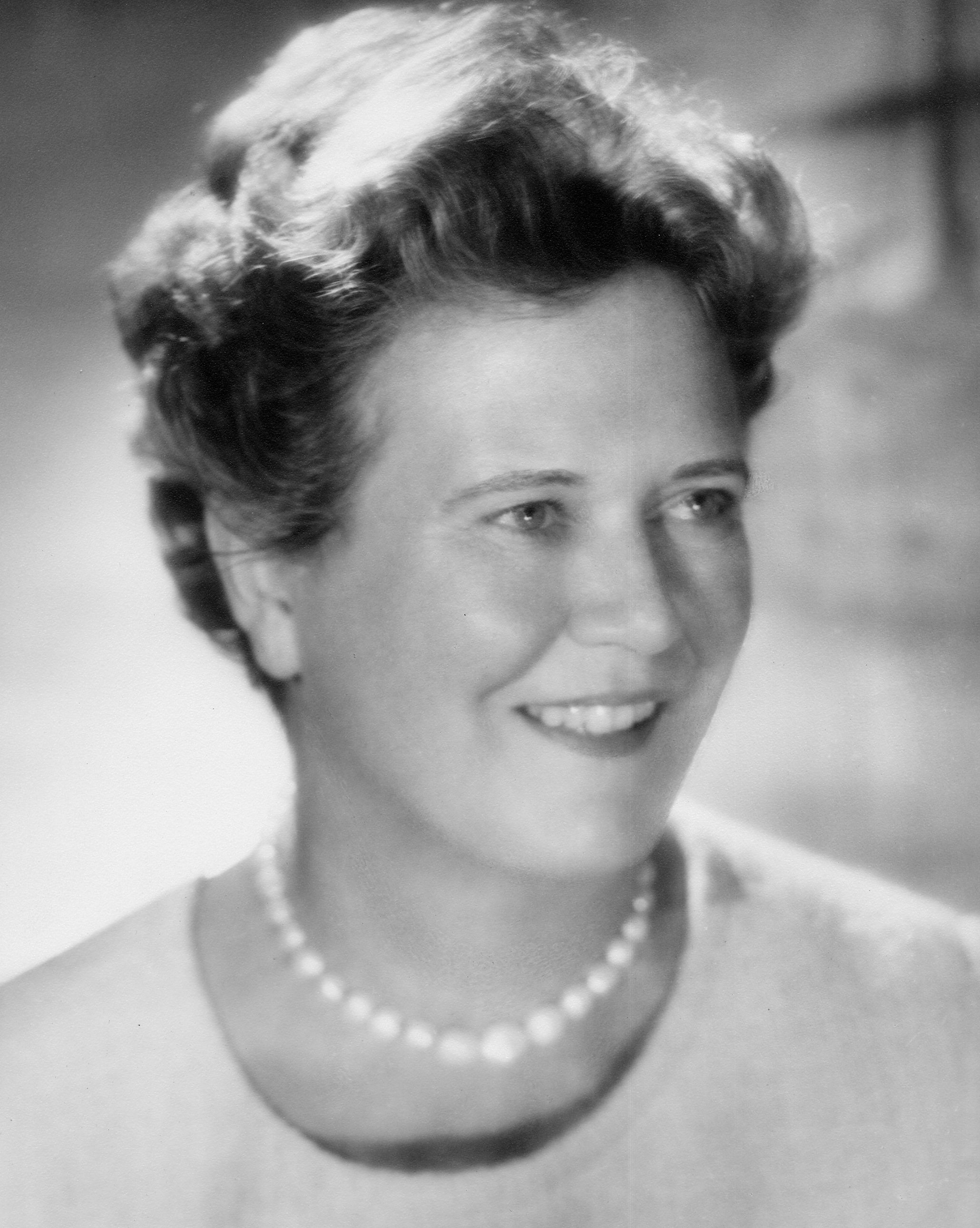
- Born: Dorothy Mae Buffum; May 19, 1901; La Fayette, Illinois, U.S.
- Died: July 6, 1997 (aged 96); Los Angeles, California, U.S.
- Education: Stanford University
- Spouse: Norman Chandler (m. 1922; died 1973)
- Children: Camilla Chandler; Otis Chandler
- Parent(s): Charles Abel Buffum; Fern Smith Buffum
- Relatives: Mike Chandler (grandson); Harrison Gray Otis (grandfather-in-law); Harry Chandler (father-in-law)
- Awards: Variety Clubs International, Humanitarian Award 1974; UCLA Medal 1982; National Medal of Arts 1985

Dorothy Buffum Chandler (May 19, 1901 – July 6, 1997; born Dorothy Mae Buffum) was an American philanthropist. She is known for her contributions to Los Angeles performing arts and culture.

== Personal life ==
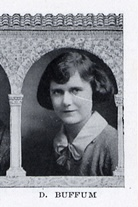
Buffum's Stanford yearbook photograph

Dorothy Mae Buffum was born in 1901 in La Fayette, Illinois. Nicknamed "Buff" or "Buffie", her family moved to Long Beach, California in 1905. Her father, Charles Abel Buffum, alongside her uncle, Edwin, opened a store that would later become the Buffums department store chain. Buffum attended Long Beach High School, and was described as a competitive student for her gender, especially against the opposite sex. An enthusiastic sprinter, she once remarked that “I didn't take to boys much except to run against them and beat them".

Buffum went on to study history at Stanford University, and was a member of the Pi Beta Phi sorority. At a school dance, she met fellow student Norman Chandler, the eldest son of the family that had published the Los Angeles Times since 1883. The couple married in 1922, and had two children, Camilla and Otis, both born in 1927. The Chandlers went on to have eight grandchildren and 14 great-grandchildren. In 1945, her husband became publisher of the Times, a position he held until he was succeeded by their son, Otis, in 1960. Norman died in 1973, and Chandler never remarried. The family lived in Los Tiempos (the Times), a grand house on Lorraine Blvd. in Windsor Square, Los Angeles, where she lived until her death in 1997.

== Career ==
=== Times Mirror Company ===
Chandler worked at the Times or its parent, the Times Mirror Company, from 1948 to 1976. She was a director of Times Mirror from 1955 until 1973, when she was named director emeritus. She initiated the Times Woman of the Year award, which was given to 243 women from 1950 through 1976.

=== Philanthropy ===
In 1956, President Dwight D. Eisenhower appointed Chandler to his Committee on Education Beyond the High School and, in 1964, President Lyndon B. Johnson named her to the U.S. Advisory Commission on Information.

As the wife of the publisher of the city's leading newspaper, Chandler became active in Los Angeles cultural circles. In 1951, a financial crisis closed the Hollywood Bowl during its summer season. Chandler chaired a committee that organized a series of fundraising concerts that led to the Bowl's reopening. She later served as president of its parent organization, the Southern California Symphony Association. Chandler served as a chairwoman of the Building Committee and regent of the University of California from 1954 to 1968, during its period of most rapid growth, when the system grew from five to nine campuses. She also served as a trustee of Occidental College from 1952 to 1967.

Chandler later led a nine-year effort to build a performing arts center for the city of Los Angeles. In 1955, she raised $400,000 at a benefit concert at the Ambassador Hotel featuring Dinah Shore, Danny Kaye and Jack Benny. Chandler sought funds from both the long established "old money" families of Pasadena, but also to "new money" communities on the city's Westside and Hollywood, many of whom were Jewish. Attorney Paul Ziffren remarked that "before the Music Center, Jews were not a part of the social life of this community." He regarded Chandler to be "primarily responsible for opening up this community in terms of Jews and Gentiles." Chandler eventually garnered enough donations to cover $20 million of the estimated $35 million total cost; the remainder was paid through private bond sales.

Chandler was featured on the cover of the December 18, 1964, issue of Time magazine, which praised her fundraising efforts as "perhaps the most impressive display of virtuoso money-raising and civic citizenship in the history of U.S. womanhood." The Los Angeles Music Center held its first performance on December 6, 1964. Chandler hired its first conductor, Zubin Mehta, to lead the Los Angeles Philharmonic orchestra. The complex was completed in 1967, consisting of three venues: the Dorothy Chandler Pavilion, named in honor of Chandler, the Mark Taper Forum and the Ahmanson Theatre. The Chandler Pavilion served as the home of the Los Angeles Philharmonic from 1964 until 2003, when the Music Center opened its fourth hall, the Walt Disney Concert Hall.

Author David Halberstam referred to Chandler as a "woman before her time. A feminist in pioneer country. Always, above all else, a presence." Former Mayor Tom Bradley declared her "a giant in the cultural life of Los Angeles. We shall always remember her whenever we see the Music Center, knowing that without her vision and energetic leadership, it would not have been built in our lifetime." On September 17, 2005, the Walt Disney Concert Hall held a Dorothy Chandler memorial concert.

== Awards ==
- 1971: the Herbert Hoover Medal for Distinguished Service, awarded by the Stanford University Alumni Assn.
- 1974: Humanitarian Award from Variety Clubs International
- 1982: UCLA Medal from the University of California, Los Angeles
- 1985: National Medal of Arts from the National Endowment for the Arts
