= Dark budgerigar mutation =

Genetic mutation affecting the colour of budgerigars

The Dark budgerigar mutation is one of approximately 30 mutations affecting the colour of budgerigars. It is part of the genetic constitution of the following recognised varieties: Dark Green and Olive in the green series and Cobalt, Mauve and Violet in the blue series.

== Appearance ==
| Variety | Pantone Colour |
|---|---|
| Light Green | 375 |
| Dark Green | 369 |
| Olive | 371 |
| Skyblue | 310 |
| Cobalt | 2915 |
| Mauve | 535 |
| Violet | 2727 |

Budgerigars carrying the Dark factor are identical to the wild-type Light Greens or Skyblues in every respect except body colour and tail feathers. The body is darker in Dark Greens and Cobalts and darker still in Olives and Mauves, and the long tail feathers are darker in proportion. All these varieties have normal violet cheek patches.

The Dark Green's body colour is a rich shade of forest green, and Cobalt's a deeper blue, approximating to azure. The Olive is a rich olive similar in shade to a Grey-green, but it may be easily distinguished by its cheek patch, which is violet in the Olive and grey in the Grey-green. The Mauve is a dull purplish gray, quite different from the brilliant Violet and Cobalt. In nest feather the Mauve is almost grey, but the violet cheek patch, although somewhat darker than in other varieties, identifies it as a Mauve.

The Violet Cobalt (a composite of the Blue, Dark and Violet mutations) is a brilliant shade of violet, rather similar but not quite as deep as and rather bluer than the wild-type violet cheek patches.

The World Budgerigar Organisation has established precise standards for certain budgerigar body colours using Pantone colour numbers, as shown to the right.

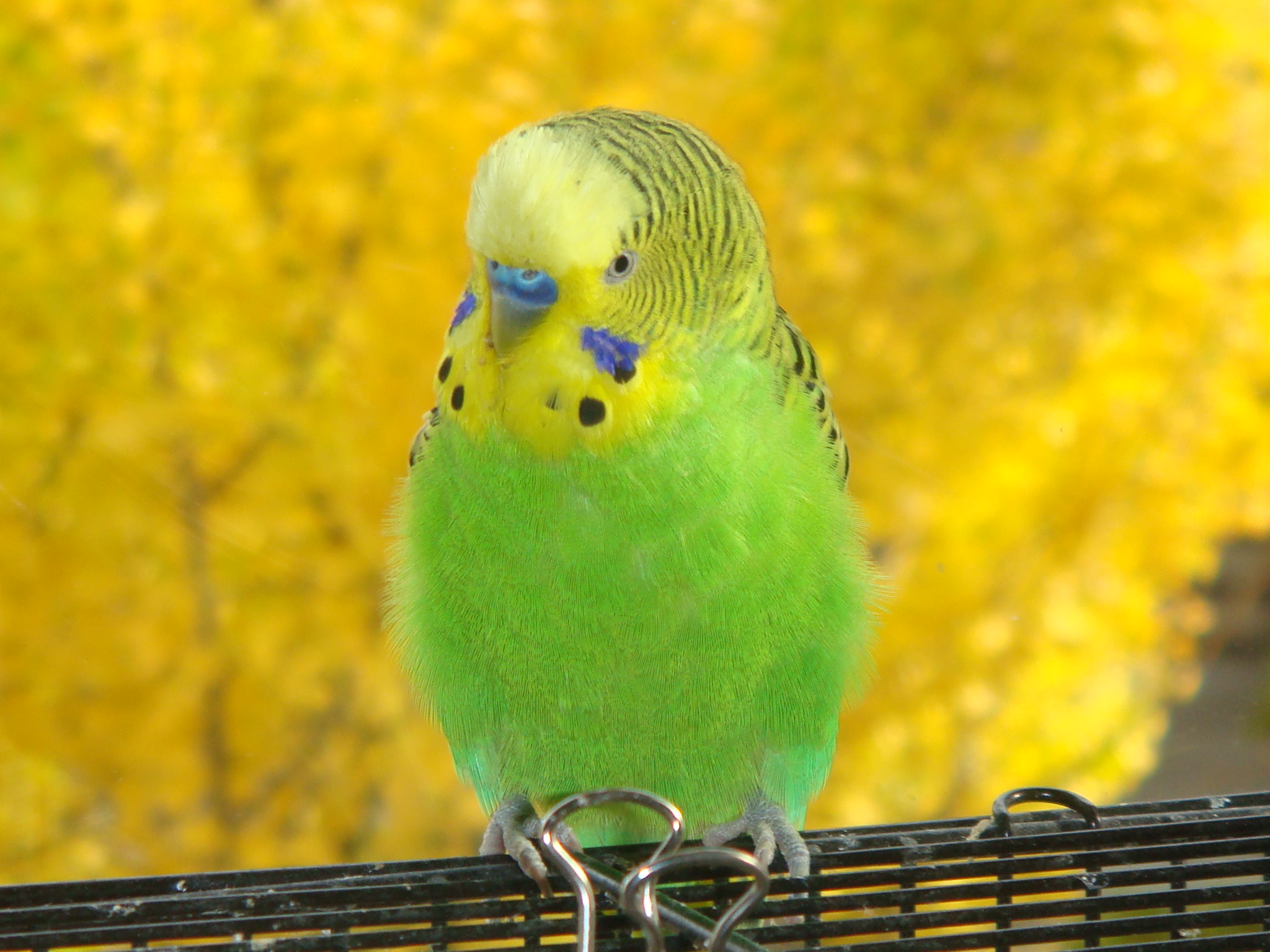
Light Green cock

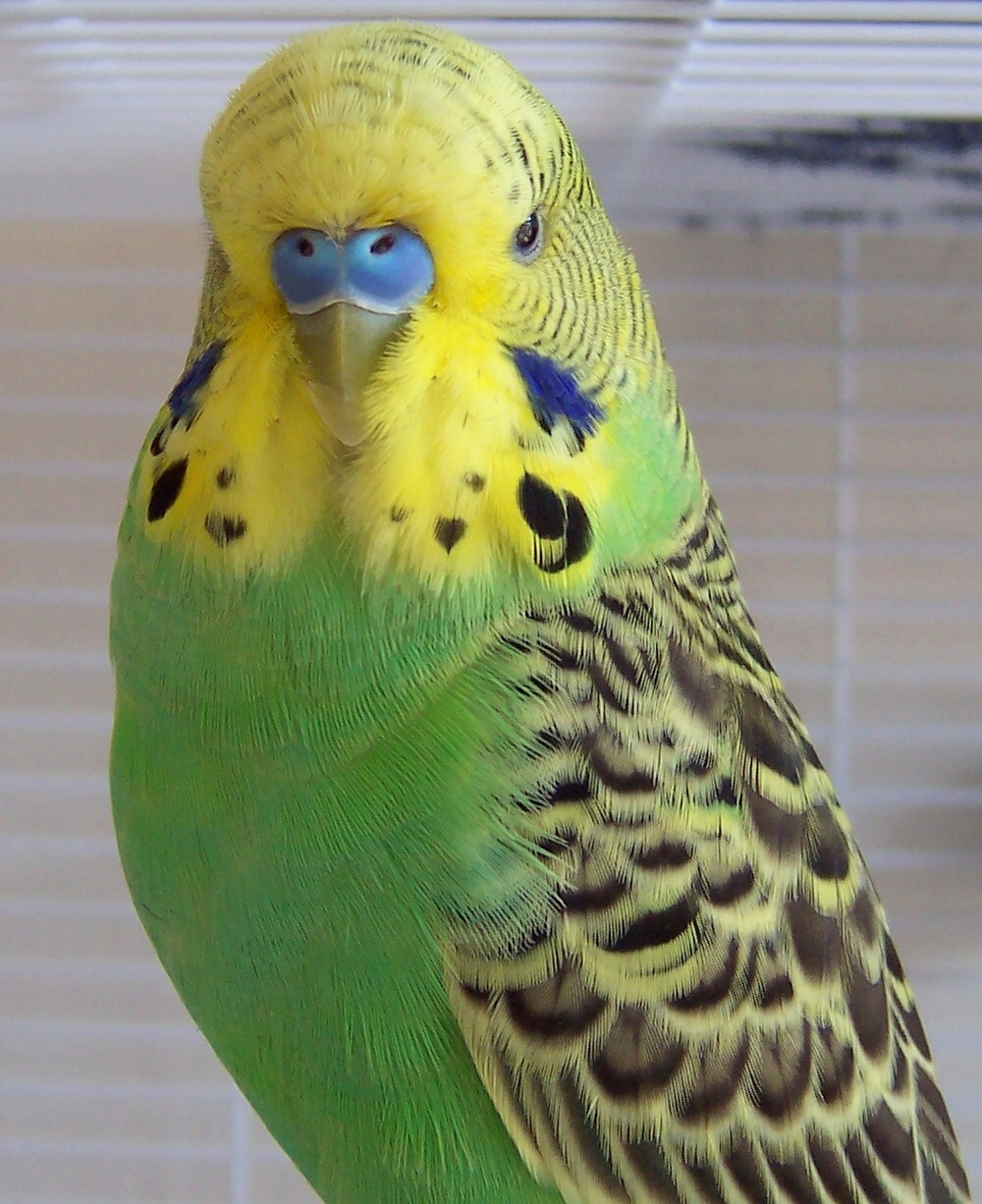
Dark Green cock

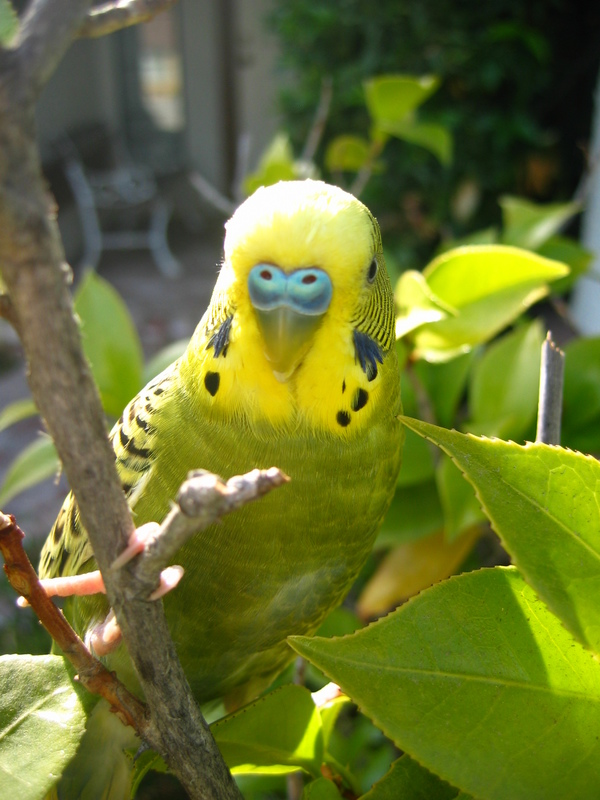
Olive cock

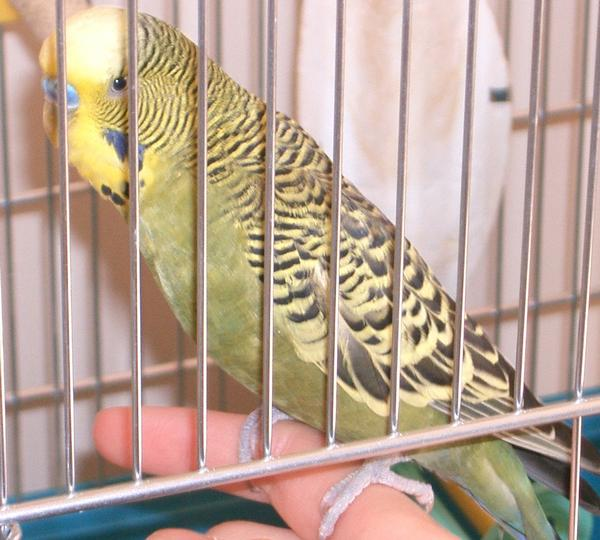
Olive cock
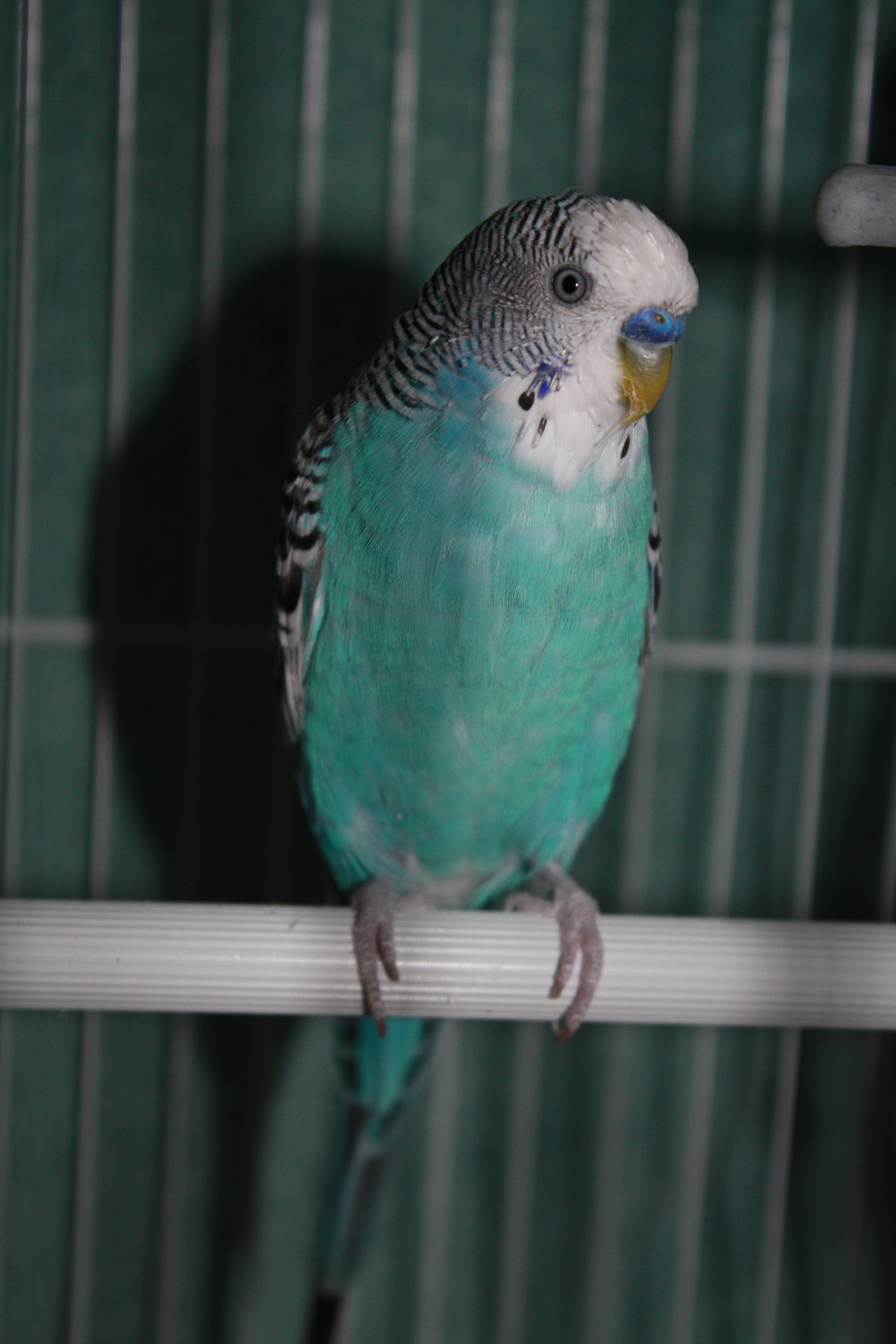
Skyblue cock

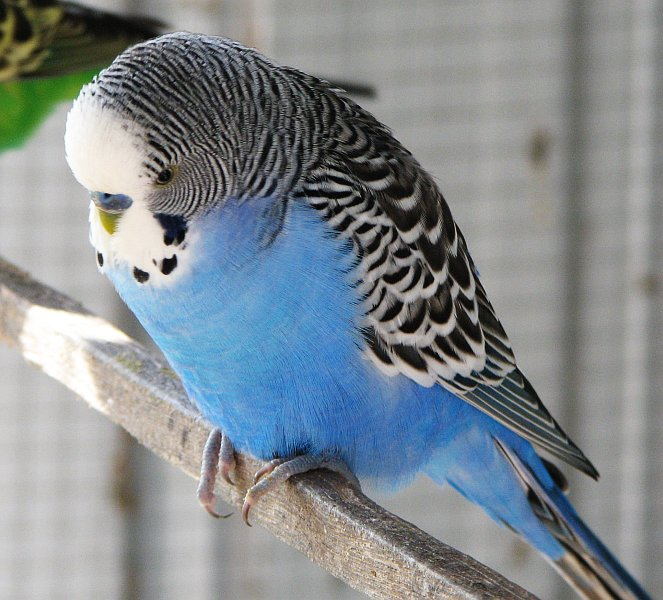
Cobalt cock

== Historical notes ==
The Dark mutation is common in the wild as Dark Green budgerigars have been observed in wild flocks on several occasions. One of the earliest to be seen was one captured during an expedition to Australia and exhibited in a London museum in 1847. But the Dark mutation was not seen in the domesticated budgerigar until the summer of 1915 when a Dark Green was observed by Monsieur A Blanchard in his aviaries in Toulouse. At the time, Toulouse was the main commercial centre for budgerigar distribution in Europe, handling thousands of imported and aviary-bred birds each year. The origins of this first Dark Green are not known. Dark Greens were known initially as Laurel Greens, a name which remained popular throughout the 1920s.

Mon. Blanchard produced the first Olives from a pair of Dark Greens in the autumn of 1916, and J D Hamlyn imported some of the early Olives to England from France in 1918.

The first Cobalts were bred by Mon. Blanchard in 1920, and by George F Hedges in 1923 while he was the aviary attendant for Madame Lecallier in France. These were initially called Powder Blues. Some of these latter Cobalts were purchased by Mrs Dalton Burgess and imported to England. She exhibited one (as a Royal Blue) in February 1924 at the Crystal Palace and later that year bred the first Mauves from them. She called the Mauves French Greys in nest feather, and when adult they were known as Lilacs or Lavenders.

The blue forms of the Dark mutation were far more popular than the Greens and commanded fantastic prices in the mid-twenties. In February 1927 Mauves and Cobalts were sold for £175 a pair, but by 1931 the price was down to £2 a pair, as more and more were quickly bred.

== Genetics ==
The Dark mutation has an incompletely dominant relationship with its wild-type allele. That is, it shows a visible effect when present as a single factor (heterozygote) and a different effect when present as a double factor (homozygote). In the green series varieties the Dark Green has one Dark allele and one wild-type allele at the Dark locus and the Olive has two Dark alleles. In the blue series varieties the Cobalt has one Dark allele and one wild-type allele and the Mauve has two Dark alleles.

Because the Dark factor is always visibly expressed no budgerigar can be split for Dark. The heterozygotes of Dark—the Dark Greens and Cobalts—correspond to the splits of the recessive mutations.

The loci of the Dark mutation and the Blue allelic series are situated on the same autosome, so the Dark mutation is linked to the Blue allelic series (see genetic linkage). The cross-over value (COV) or recombination frequency between the Dark and Blue loci is often stated to be about 14%, but several careful measurements of this COV show quite widely varying results. Early measurements by Duncker and independently by Steiner obtained values of 14% and 7.6% respectively, and T G Taylor and C Warner collected results which showed only 5 cross-overs in 140—a COV of 3.6%. Included in these were results from T G Taylor's own experiments, in which he found no cross-overs in 86 birds bred. It is now known that the environment and other genes can influence the COV, so some variability should be expected. A reasonable average of these measurements is a COV of 8%.

Dark Green/blues have one Dark allele and one Blue allele together with one each of the corresponding wild-type alleles. The linkage between the Blue and Dark genes gives rise to two types of Dark Green/blue birds, both visually identical.

- Type I Dark Green/blues are bred by mating Mauves to Light Greens and have the two mutant alleles on the same chromatid. Geneticists call this 'coupling' rather than 'Type I'. Because of the linkage, the Dark and Blue alleles from Type I birds tend to be inherited together in their progeny. When mated to Skyblues, Type I birds produce predominantly Light Green/blue and Cobalt progeny, with Dark Green/blue Type II and Skyblues resulting rarely from a cross-over.
- Type II Dark Green/blues are bred by mating Skyblues to Olives and have the Dark and Blue mutant alleles on opposite chromatids. Geneticists call this 'repulsion' rather than 'Type II'. Because of the separation, the Dark and Blue alleles from Type II birds tend to be inherited separately in their progeny. When mated to Skyblues, Type II birds produce predominantly Dark Green/blue Type II and Skyblue progeny, with Light Green/blue and Cobalts resulting rarely from cross-overs.
