= Mike Chandler =

American racing driver

- Nationality: American
- Born: April 21, 1958 (age 68) San Marino, California, U.S.
- Relatives: Otis Chandler (father)
- Statistics up to date as of January 22, 2014.

Michael Chandler (born April 21, 1958) is an American former driver in the Indianapolis 500 from 1981 to 1983. Serious injuries from a crash in 1984 effectively ended his racing career.

Chandler drove in the CART Championship Car series. In the 1980–1984 seasons, he had nine career starts, and started in the Indianapolis 500 in 1981–1983.

A near head-on crash in practice for the 1984 race left Chandler in a coma for several days and prematurely ended his career. He finished in the top-ten twice, with his best finish in fourth position in 1981 at Riverside.

== Sponsors ==
Chandler's early sponsors included his father, Los Angeles Times publisher Otis Chandler; businessman Warner Hodgdon, owner of National Engineering; and California Lieutenant Governor Mike Curb.

== Racing record ==
=== Complete USAC Mini-Indy Series results ===
Year	Entrant	1	2	3	4	5	6	7	8	Pos	Points
1979		TEX1; 3	IRP; 4	MIL1; 6	POC; 7	TEX2; 1	MIL2; 3	MIN1; 2	MIN2; 22	2nd	903
1980	Championship Racing Stables	MIL; 18	POC; 4	MOH; 3	MIN1	MIN2	ONT; 4			7th	384

=== Indianapolis 500 results ===
Year	Chassis	Engine	Start	Finish
1981	Penske	Cosworth	25th	12th
1982	Eagle	Chevrolet	22nd	17th
1983	Rattlesnake	Cosworth	30th	16th
1984	Eagle	Pontiac	Practice Crash	

=== 24 Hours of Le Mans results ===
Year	Team	Co-Drivers	Car	Class	Laps	Pos.	Class Pos.
1981	(United States) Thunderbird Swap Shop	(United States) Preston Henn (France) Marcel Mignot	Porsche 935-K3/80	IMSA GTX	45	DNF	DNF

=== 24 Hours of Daytona results ===
Year	Team	Co-Drivers	Car	Class	Laps	Pos.	Class Pos.
1983	(United States) All American Racers	(United States) Dennis Aase (United States) Al Unser Jr.	Toyota Celica Mk. III	GTU	130	DNF	DNF
1984	(United States) All American Racers	(United States) Dennis Aase (United States) Wally Dallenbach Jr.	Toyota Celica Mk. III	GTU	49	DNF	DNF
