= List of Los Angeles Times publishers =

The publisher of the Los Angeles Times since June 16, 2018, has been Patrick Soon-Shiong, who purchased the newspaper from the Tribune Company of Chicago. Soon-Shiong replaced Ross Levinsohn, who was appointed to the position in August of 2017 following the firing of publisher Davan Maharaj. The publisher is typically a newspaper's top executive, similar in function to the job of corporate chief executive officer. Sometimes, though, a newspaper's publisher is a corporation or a company, and that was the case for decades with the Times, which listed its "publisher" as the Times-Mirror Company. The person responsible for operating the newspaper was officially called the president and general manager, but he was casually referred to as the publisher.

The official list of past publishers offered by the Times in both print and electronic versions begins with Harrison Gray Otis in 1882, but Otis never held that title officially. Indeed, he was not even the first executive to guide the newspaper.

The list below includes all the people who could be considered the chief executive officer of the newspaper.

== Early days ==
None of these people used the title of publisher.

- Thomas Gardiner, business manager, and Nathan Cole Jr., editor (referred to as the projectors) (1881)
- Thomas Jesse Yarnell, Thomas J. Caystile and S.J. Mathes (referred to as the successors) (1882)

== Harrison Gray Otis ==
The dates of service are those given in the masthead of the Times.

- Harrison Gray Otis (1882–1917), president and general manager

== Chandler family ==
- Harry Chandler (1917–1944)
- Norman Chandler (1944–1960)
- Otis Chandler (1960–1980)

== Post-Chandler ==
- Tom Johnson (1980–1989)
- David Laventhol (1989–1994)
- Richard T. Schlosberg III (1994–1997)
- Mark H. Willes (1997–1999)
- Kathryn Downing (1999–2000), the first woman publisher

== Tribune Company ==
- John Puerner (2000–2005)
- Jeffrey Johnson(2005–2006)
- David Hiller (2006–2008)
- Eddy Hartenstein (2008–2014)
- Austin Beutner (2014–2015)
- Timothy Ryan (2015–2016)
- Davan Maharaj (2016–2017)
- Ross Levinsohn (2017–2018)

== Private ownership ==
- Patrick Soon-Shiong (2018-)
