= George Rose =

George Rose may refer to:

== Americans ==
- George Rose (American football) (1942–2023), American professional football cornerback
- George Rose (Navy member) (1880–1932), American recipient of the Medal of Honor
- George Rose (photographer), (born 1952), American photographer and writer
- George M. Rose, Speaker of the North Carolina House of Representatives
- George Rose, onetime co-founder of the Dorchester Railroad horse car line in Boston, Massachusetts

== Australians ==
- George Rose (rugby league) (born 1983), Australian Boxing promoter and former professional rugby league footballer
- George Rose (Australian photographer) (1861–1942), Australian photographer and father of Herbert Rose

== Britons ==
- George Rose (actor) (1920–1988), English actor and singer
- George Rose (barrister) (1782–1873), English barrister and law reporter
- George Rose (businessman), British businessman
- George Rose (politician) (1744–1818), British politician
- George Henry Rose (1771–1855), British politician and diplomat
- George Rose (1787–1873), soldier in the British Army from 1809–1837
- George Pitt Rose (1797–1851), British politician and soldier

== See also ==
- Giwargis Warda, 13th-century Syriac poet, Giwargis being the equivalent of "George" and warda meaning "rose"
