= Thomas Gardiner (publisher) =

American journalist and newspaper publisher

- Born: June 1826; Glasgow, Scotland
- Died: June 10, 1899 (aged 72–73); California, United States
- Occupation: Journalist
- Organization: The Los Angeles Times

Thomas Gardiner (June 1826–June 10, 1899) was a Scottish-born American journalist. He was the manager of the San Diego Union and a founder of the Los Angeles Daily Times, precursors to today's San Diego Union-Tribune and Los Angeles Times, respectively.

== Biography ==
Gardiner was born near Glasgow, Scotland, in June 1826. As a boy, he entered the dry goods business in Kilmarnock, Scotland. He emigrated to the United States and settled first in Cleveland, Ohio, then went to California as part of the gold rush of 1850. In 1852, he settled permanently in California, where he became publisher of the Sacramento Union. In December 1881 he assisted Nathan Cole Jr. in the establishment of the Los Angeles Times but had to give up the business after only a short time when he could not pay a printing bill for the newspaper, which was then taken over by Jesse Yarnell, Thomas J. Caystile and S.J. Mathes, proprietors of the printing establishment.

In September 1882 he joined in starting another newspaper, the Los Angeles Telegram, which he moved to Portland, Oregon, after less than a month. He briefly published The Arizona Quarterly Illustrated in Tucson. His premier July 1880 issue featured two of C. S. Fly's photographs as engravings. After only a few issues, Gardiner moved to San Diego, where he became advertising manager for the Coronado Beach Company. He became manager of the San Diego Union in 1891.

Gardiner was said to be something of a dandy. Fifty-seven years after his death, a Times reporter wrote that Gardiner "wore mutton-chop whiskers, a high silk hat and a frock coat to the astonishment of Los Angeles citizens" and that Cole, who was the son of a rich St. Louis resident, put up most of the money to found the Times, but it was Gardiner who "imperiously went about the streets as business manager."

In his last months, he suffered from heart and kidney troubles, and he died on June 10, 1899. He was survived by a wife and four sons. His remains were buried in Oakland, California.

== See also ==
- List of Los Angeles Times publishers
