= S. J. Mathes =

Journalist and printer

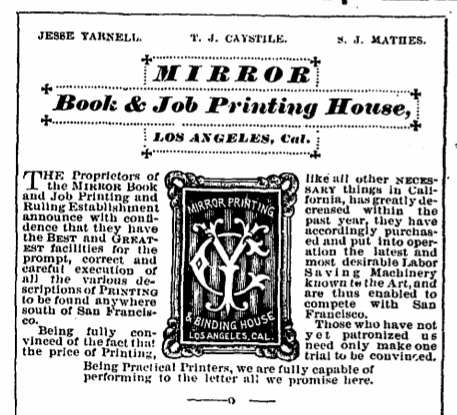
1882 Mirror Printing Company advertisement and logo

Samuel Jay Mathes (1849?–1927), known as S. J. Mathes, was a pioneer printer and newspaperman in Los Angeles, California, who in 1881 and 1882 directed the editorial policies of the newly established Los Angeles Daily Times, which later became the Los Angeles Times, until General Harrison Gray Otis took over in August 1882. Mathes later became, in effect, a tour operator for visitors to Southern California aboard Pullman sleeping cars from the East

== Southern California ==
Mathes came to Los Angeles in 1875. "It was a little one-horse town in those days, but there were two or three newspapers," he recalled in a Times interview forty-six years later.

I took a job as foreman of the old Herald and stayed there three or four years. Then Tom Caystile and Jesse Yarnell and I went into the printing business. We published the Mirror as a little house organ to advertise our business. It was always in my mind to start a daily paper. I suggested it several times to my partners, but they wouldn't hear of it.

The three partners were the printers for a number of other newspapers as well. On December 4, 1881, the firm contracted with Nathan Cole Jr. and Thomas Gardiner to publish their new newspaper, the Los Angeles Daily Times. Cole and Gardiner simply could not meet their printing bill, so Gardiner turned the enterprise over to his partner, Cole, and to Mathes, Yarnell and Caystile within a month of the paper's birth. Mathes took over as editor.

For about a year, I ran the paper alone. It was a fearful job. I worked until I was completely worn out, and my health was imperiled. Col. Otis happened to come along then. . . . He bought a fourth interest in the paper, and at once became a dominant figure in the office as well as the community.

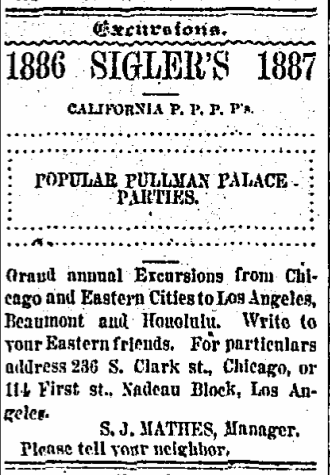
A Mathes Pullman excursion advertisement from November 21, 1886

With Otis as editor, Mathes served for a short time as business manager but then "we finally sold out our interests and the paper was reorganized." Mathes then began conducting Pullman excursions between Chicago and Los Angeles. He later became a real estate man. He moved to Catalina Island off the Southern California coast, where he became the correspondent of the Times and was editor of a small daily.

== Personal life ==
Mathes was born in Knoxville, Tennessee, the son of a Presbyterian clergyman who was a firm believer in abolition. The father sold his slaves and moved to Sigourney, Iowa, where the younger Mathes received his education. When he was 16, the boy left home to go to Burlington, Iowa, where he learned his trade as a printer. He was a printer also in Chicago, Illinois, but returned to Iowa to found the Wilton Chronicle in Wilton. In 1875, he was briefly in Colorado Springs, Colorado, where he founded the Colorado Mountaineer. Earlier, in 1868, he worked at the Wilton Press in Wilton, Iowa.

An illness he contracted in 1900 remained with him until the day he died at age 78 in Los Angeles on January 28, 1927. He died at the home of Minnie Neighbors May, a former Sunday school pupil. Mathes was survived by two grandchildren, Ralph and Eleanor Bowdie, both of Long Beach, California.

== See also ==
- List of Los Angeles Times publishers
