= Andrés Martinez (editor) =

American journalist

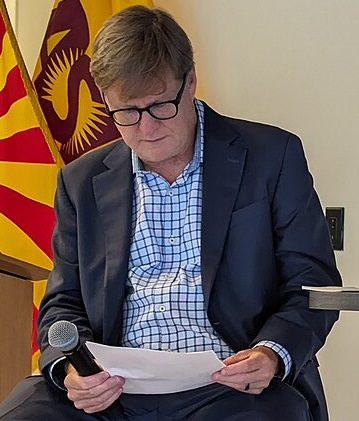
Andrés Martinez in 2024

Andrés Martínez (born c. 1966 in Mexico) is an American journalist. He is currently the director of the Bernard L. Schwartz Fellows Program at the New America Foundation. In the past, he has worked as an opinion journalist and business writer, his highest position as editorial page editor of the Los Angeles Times, a position from which he resigned amid scandal.

== Youth ==
Martinez was born in Mexico to Jeanette B. Martinez (of Boston) and Alfredo Martinez Urdal of Mexico City.

He graduated from Yale University with a history degree in 1988. He earned a Master's Degree in Russian history from Stanford University in 1989, and a J.D. degree from Columbia University in 1992, where he served on Law Review.

== Career ==
=== Law (1992-1993) ===
After law school, Martinez practiced communications law in Washington, D.C. at the firm Verner Lipfer, and served as a law clerk for Federal District Judge Jerry Buchmeyer in Dallas.

=== Journalism ===
==== Pittsburgh (1994-1997) ====
Switching to journalism, Martinez went to work as a reporter for the Pittsburgh Post-Gazette in 1995. In 1995, Martinez moved to the Post-Gazette's editorial board, where he served until 1997.

===== Marriage =====
In 1995, Martinez married Katherine Collins Hall, an associate at Kirkpatrick & Lockhart, a law firm in Pittsburgh, when Martinez was 29 years old. The couple divorced but together they have a son named Sebastian.

==== The Wall Street Journal (1997-98) ====
Martinez went on to work for The Wall Street Journal as a business reporter in 1997.

==== Book on Las Vegas (1999) ====
In 1999, Martinez released his first book, 24/7: Living It Up and Doubling Down in the New Las Vegas.

==== The New York Times (2000-2004) ====
In 2000 Martinez became a writer at The New York Times. There, he served as assistant editorial page editor and a member of the editorial board. In 2004, he was a Pulitzer Prize finalist for editorials he wrote about how U.S. farm subsidies negatively impact the third world.

==== Los Angeles Times (2004-2007) ====
After moving to the Los Angeles Times in September 2004, Martinez's duties were expanded to include oversight of the op-ed page and "Sunday Current", in addition to his responsibilities for the editorial page, upon the October 2005 resignation from the paper of Michael Kinsley, who had served as editorial and opinion editor.

===== "Grazergate" Controversy =====
In March 2007, Los Angeles Times reporter James Rainey wrote that the paper's publisher David Hiller was considering the cancellation of that weekend's "Sunday Current" section in response to an internal controversy regarding Martinez's role. Rainey wrote that the news staff of the Times, including editor Jim O'Shea, pressured Hiller to stop publication after learning that Martinez was romantically involved with a key position employee.

Martinez called a staff meeting in hopes of quelling criticism, where he denied that his relationship with Mullens played a role in Grazer's selection as guest editor. Later in the day he filed a post on the Times opinion blog where he claimed several other editors were involved in the decision, denied Mullens played any role, and described allegations of a conflict of interest as "absurd".

The next day, Hiller canceled the section, and issued a statement: "We believe that this relationship did not influence the selection of Brian as guest editor. Nonetheless, in order to avoid even the appearance of conflict, we felt the best course of action was not to publish the section." Soon after, Martinez resigned his position (and then blogged about it), suggesting that he had been done in by the newsroom of his own paper, calling Hiller's decision a vote of "no confidence".

===== Legal fallout and allegations of harassment =====
In August 2008, Martinez filed a lawsuit against ex-girlfriend Mullens, alleging that the public relations executive had cost him his job at the newspaper and tarnished his professional reputation. Mullens' attorney claimed that the suit was retaliation against her client, who had filed a restraining against Martinez earlier in the year.

==== The Washington Post (2007-2008) ====
In November 2007, Martinez was hired by the Washington Post's website to write a twice-weekly political advice column called "Stumped". The column ran through the end of the presidential campaign in November 2008.

=== Public Policy (2007-Present) ===
In July 2007, Martinez started a new job as a fellow at the New America Foundation. In 2009, Martinez was hired to direct the Bernard L. Schwartz Fellows Program with the mission to "identify and support the next generation of American public policy scholars and writers" at the New America Foundation in Washington, DC.
