= Below the Fold =

Below the Fold The Pulitzer That Defined Latino Journalism
- Directed by: Roberto Gudiño
- Written by: Roberto Gudiño
- Produced by: Roberto Gudiño; Olga Briseno
- Cinematography: Roberto Gudiño
- Edited by: Roberto Gudiño
- Music by: Anthony Chapman
- Production companies: Gudino Productions; Working Title Films
- Release dates: October 27, 2007 (Los Angeles Latino International Film Festival)
- Running time: 26 minutes
- Country: USA
- Language: English

Below the Fold: The Pulitzer That Defined Latino Journalism is a 2007 American documentary film written and directed by Roberto Gudiño to chronicle the story of the Mexican American journalists of the Los Angeles Times who responded to negative portrayals of Latinos in the newspaper by publishing the newspaper series "Latinos". The newspaper received the 1984 Pulitzer Prize for Public Service for the series. Filmed on locations in Arizona, California and New York, the project debuted at the Los Angeles Latino International Film Festival in October 2007.

== Synopsis ==
On July 12, 1981 the Los Angeles Times published the first article in what came to be known as the "Marauders Series". Full of negative stereotypes and inflammatory language, the series depicted African Americans and Latinos as ruthless thieves who committed crimes in affluent neighborhoods and who fled via L.A.'s freeways.

Mexican-American reporters organized and approached the Los Angeles Times editors with a proposed new series: in-depth feature articles on Southern California Latino life that would go beyond depictions of poverty, gangs, and crime. Their innovative story approach and produced a 27-part-story project. Some of their non-Hispanic newsroom colleagues made racist comments while the journalists worked, and the team had to fight to get the series nominated for a Pulitzer Prize.

Their efforts were rewarded with the 1984 Pulitzer Prize for Public Service, presented to the Los Angeles Times. The first Latino group to be recognized with a Pulitzer, they were honored at the Pulitzer luncheon ceremony at Columbia University where Walter Cronkite and Peter Jennings were in attendance. Below The Fold tells the story of a group of people fighting to make their own voices heard. In doing so, present a complex and rich representation of Latinos in the news media and generally in the U.S.

== Recognition ==
The film was called "a powerful and heartfelt account of the journalists who set out to change the stereotypical reporting on Latinos in southern California."

=== Awards and accolades ===
- 2008, Directors Guild of America jury award for best student film for Roberto Gudiño.
- 2008, Imagen Awards nomination for 'Best Theatrical Short'.

== Remake ==
When interviewed at the Imagen Awards in September 2008, Gudiño announced his "hopes to expand Below The Fold into a one-hour documentary for national broadcast." In November 2010, Latino Public Broadcasting announced Above The Fold as one of the recipients of the 2010 Public Media Content Fund. Roberto Gudiño will be using the funding to expand the 2007 short film Below the Fold into a feature-length documentary to be called Above the Fold. In April 2011, he received an additional $10,000 grant from Film Independent to complete his project, the first LG Cinema 3D Fellowship in "Project: Involve" production grant to be awarded by them.

== See also ==
- National Association of Hispanic Journalists
