= Harrison Gray Otis (publisher) =

American newspaper publisher (1837–1917)

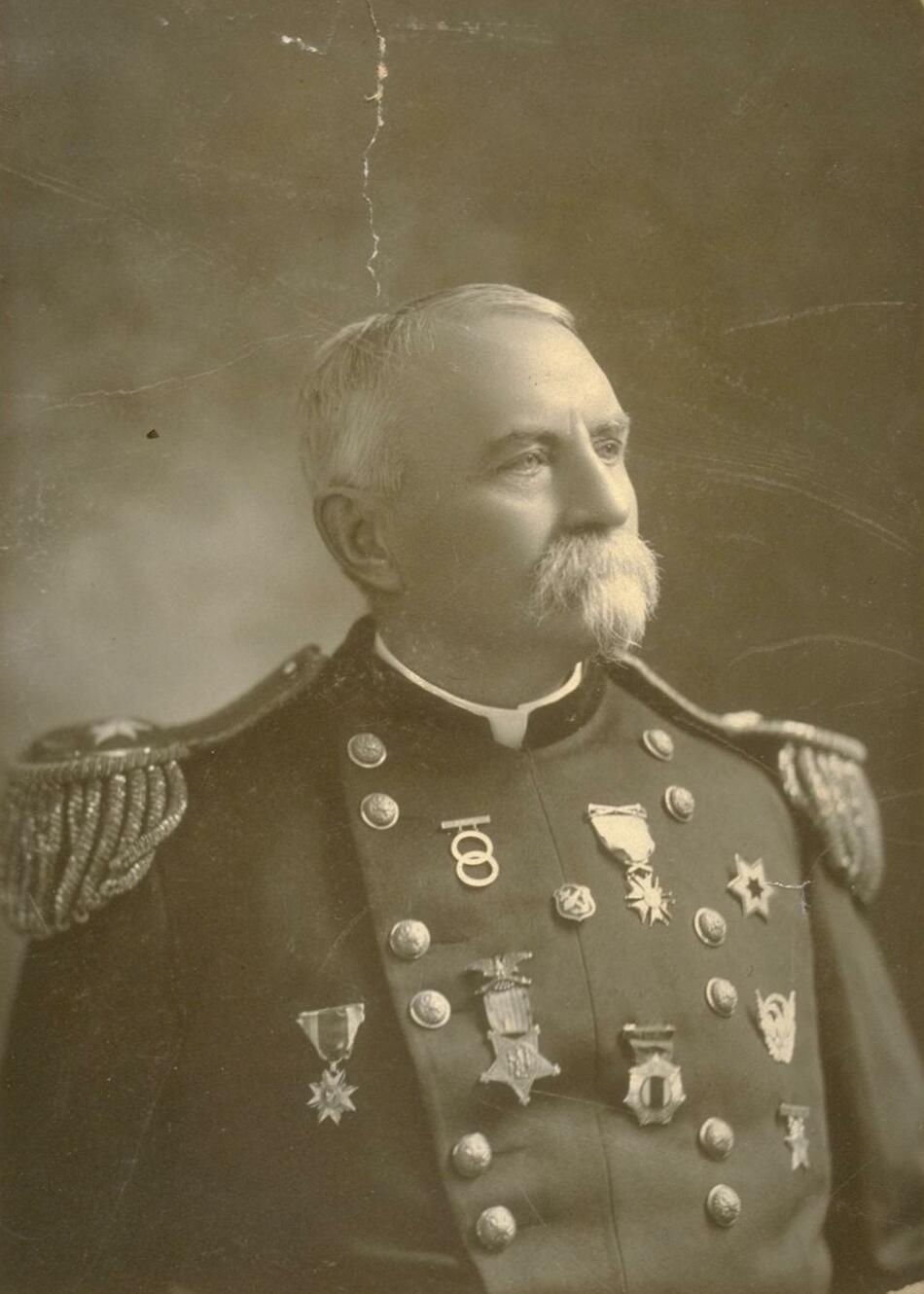
- Portrait by Theodore C. Marceau
- Born: February 10, 1837 near Marietta, Ohio, U.S.
- Died: July 30, 1917 (aged 80); Los Angeles, California, U.S.
- Occupation: newspaper publisher
- Political party: Republican
- Spouse: Eliza Ann Wetherby (m. 1859; died 1904)
- Children: 3, including Marian
- Parents: Stephen Otis; Sara Dyar Otis
- Relatives: Harry Chandler (son-in-law); Norman Chandler (grandson); Dorothy Buffum Chandler (granddaughter-in-law); Otis Chandler (great-grandson); Mike Chandler (great-great-grandson)
- Military career
- Branch: United States Army
- Service years: 1861–1865; 1898–1902
- Rank: Brigadier general
- Units: 12th Ohio Infantry Regiment; 23rd Ohio Infantry Regiment; Eighth Army Corps
- Commands: Company H, 23rd Ohio Infantry Regiment; 1st Brigade, 2nd Division, Eighth Army Corps
- Conflicts: American Civil War; Battle of Scary Creek; Battle of Carnifex Ferry; Battle of South Mountain; Battle of Antietam; Battle of Cloyd's Mountain; Battle of Lynchburg; Battle of Kernstown (II); Philippine–American War; Battle of Manila; Battle of Caloocan

Harrison Gray Otis (February 10, 1837 – July 30, 1917) was an American Union Army officer during the American Civil War, who became president and general manager of the Times Mirror Company, then the publisher of the Los Angeles Times.

== Biography ==
=== Early life and education ===
The assumed arms of Harrison Gray Otis

Otis was born near Marietta, Ohio, on February 10, 1837, the son of Stephen and Sara "Sally" (Dyar) Otis. His father was from Vermont and his mother, a native of Nova Scotia, Canada, came to Ohio from Boston, Massachusetts, with her family. The young Otis received schooling until he was fourteen, when he became a printer's apprentice at the Noble County Courier in Ohio.

== Career ==
Otis was a delegate from Kentucky to the Republican National Convention that nominated Abraham Lincoln for president in 1860.

=== Military service ===
At the outbreak of the American Civil War in 1861, he left his job as a compositor in the office of the Louisville Journal to volunteer as a private for the Union army. Otis enlisted as a Sergeant in Kentucky on June 25, 1861, in Company I of the 12th Ohio Infantry Regiment. He fought with the 12th at the Battle of Scary Creek, Battle of Carnifex Ferry, Battle of South Mountain, Battle of Antietam, Battle of Cloyd's Mountain, and the Battle of Lynchburg.

On July 2, 1864, the veterans of the 12th Ohio were transferred to the 23rd Ohio Infantry, and with Company H, Otis fought at the Second Battle of Kernstown where he was wounded. He was promoted to 1st Sergeant on March 1, 1862, 2nd Lieutenant on September 30, 1862, 1st Lieutenant on March 21, 1863, Captain on July 1, 1864, and Lieutenant-Colonel on March 13, 1865. Otis was mustered out of the Army on July 26, 1865.

He was wounded twice in battle, was "twice breveted for gallant and meritorious conduct" and was promoted seven times.

=== Journalism ===
After the war, Otis was Official Reporter of the Ohio House of Representatives, then moved to Washington, D.C., where he was a government official, correspondent and editor. In 1876, he and his family moved to Santa Barbara, California, which had a population then of about 3,000, and he purchased a local newspaper, the Santa Barbara Press, from William Welles Hollister, effective March 11 of that year. He gave up journalism temporarily in 1879 when he was offered the post of chief government agent or special treasury agent of the Northern Seal Islands, now known as the Pribilof Islands, in the Pacific Ocean off the coast of the newly acquired territory of Alaska. He left that position in 1881 to return to Santa Barbara.

Otis was editing his newspaper there when he went to Los Angeles – a larger city with a population of some 12,500 – and agreed with the firm of Yarnell, Caystile & Mathes to take over editorial responsibilities at the Los Angeles Daily Times, now the Los Angeles Times. Beginning August 1, 1882, he was to "have the editorial conduct of the Daily Times and Weekly Mirror," according to an announcement in the Times. Later the company was named Times-Mirror, and on April 6, 1886, it was reorganized, with Albert McFarland and W.A. Spalding as owners and Otis as president and general manager. That was Otis's official title at the time of his death in 1917. The Times story about his demise noted that the Times-Mirror Company was "publishers [sic] of the Los Angeles Daily Times." The article called Otis the "principal owner" of the newspaper but never referred to him as publisher. Eleven years earlier, however the Associated Press had called him "publisher of the Los Angeles Times."

Otis was known for his conservative political views, which were reflected in the paper. His home was one of three buildings that were targeted in the 1910 Los Angeles Times bombing. During his time as publisher of the Times Otis is known for coining the phrase "You are either with me, or against me."

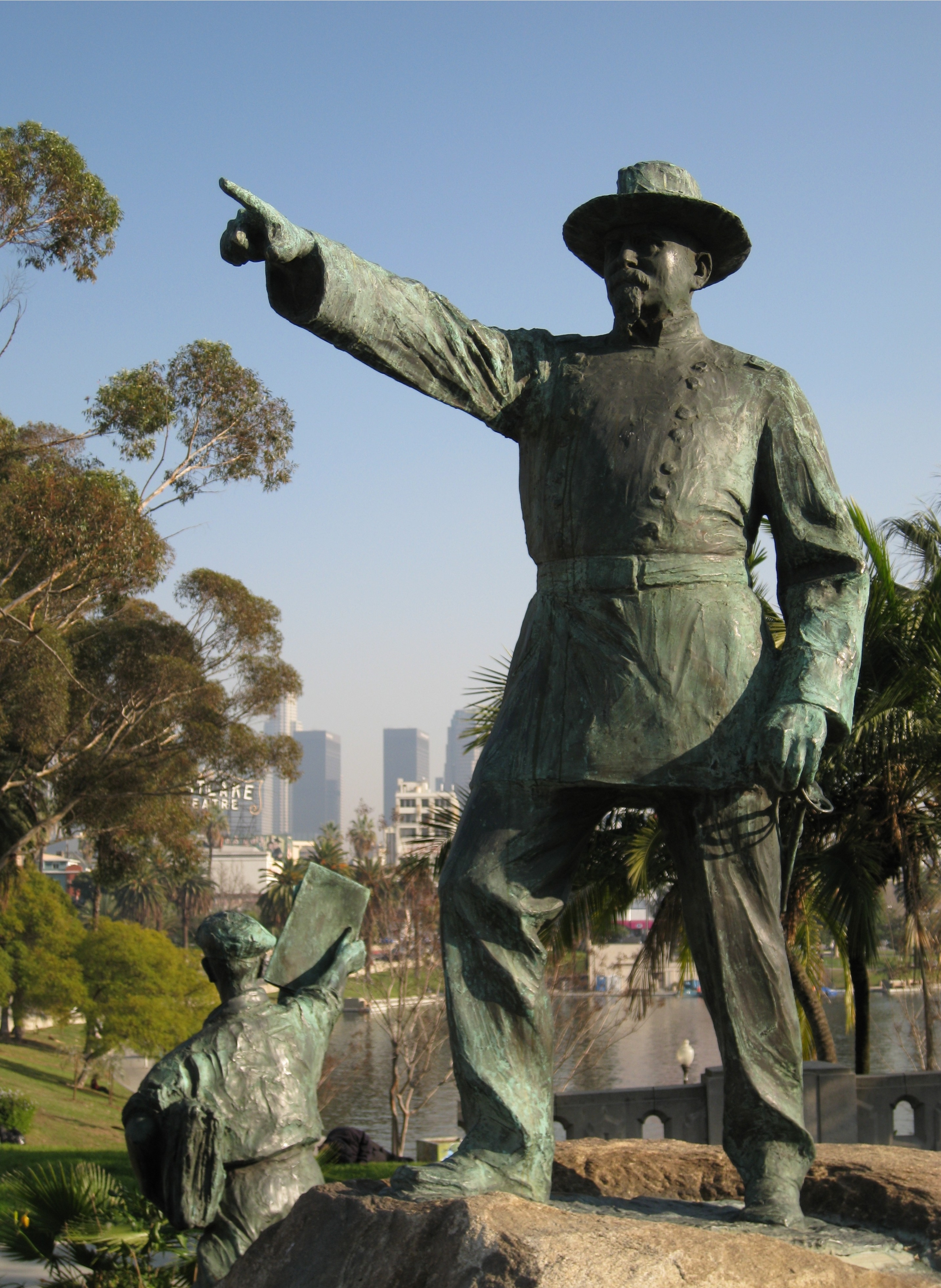
Otis statue in MacArthur Park

When the Spanish–American War broke out in 1898, Otis asked President William McKinley for an appointment as Assistant Secretary of War. But Secretary of War Russell A. Alger did not want the conservative Otis serving under him. Otis thereupon again volunteered for the Army and was appointed brigadier general of volunteers. He served in the Philippines. He did not see any action against the Spanish, but commanded the 1st Brigade, 2nd Division, VIII Corps during the Philippine–American War.

His support for his adopted city was instrumental in its growth. He was a member of a group of investors who bought land in the San Fernando Valley based on inside knowledge that the Los Angeles Aqueduct would soon irrigate it.

Otis and his son-in-law Harry Chandler and others formed the Colorado River Land Company, which bought land in the Mexicali Valley of Baja California at the turn of the twentieth century when Mexico's President Porfirio Díaz encouraged foreign investment to develop the country. The company weathered the Mexican Revolution (1910–20), but the rich agricultural land held in foreign hands was expropriated by the Mexican government during its postrevolutionary land reform.

On December 23, 1916, General Harrison Gray Otis donated his spacious Wilshire Boulevard home across the street from MacArthur Park, known as the Bivouac, to Los Angeles County to be used "continuously and perpetually for the Arts and advancement of the Arts." The Otis Art Institute of the Los Angeles Museum of History, Science, and Art eventually became Otis College of Art and Design. The home was torn down in the 1950s, but the school built new buildings and occupied the space until 1997. It is now the site of a public elementary school.

== Personal life ==
Otis married Eliza Ann Wetherby in Lowell, Ohio, on September 11, 1859, and they had three daughters: Lillian Otis McPherson; Marian Otis Chandler, who was secretary of the Times-Mirror; and Mabel Otis Booth.

== Death ==
Otis died on July 30, 1917, at the home of his son-in-law, Harry Chandler, in Los Angeles.

== See also ==
- List of Los Angeles Times publishers
