= Ross Levinsohn =

American media executive

Ross B. Levinsohn
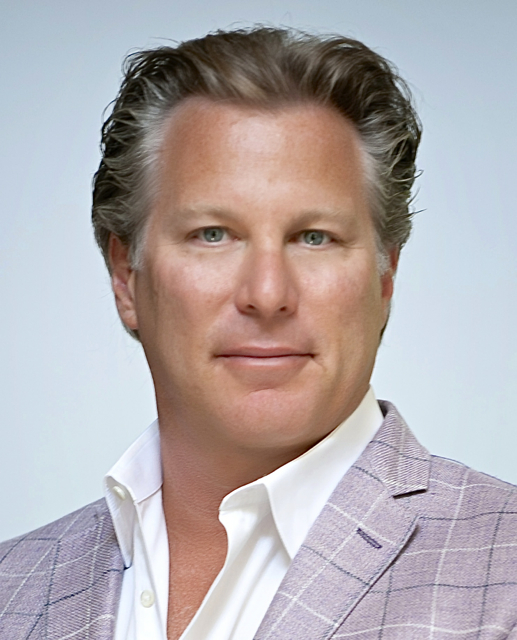
- Levinsohn in 2013
- Born: 1962 or 1963 (age 63–64); New York City, U.S.
- Education: American University

Ross B. Levinsohn is an American media executive who has worked in media and technology. He is the former CEO of The Arena Group and Sports Illustrated, and has held senior roles at Yahoo, Fox Interactive, and Tribune Publishing, including a brief tenure as publisher of the Los Angeles Times until it was sold in 2018. He became the CEO of Sports Illustrated in October 2019, and CEO of The Arena Group in August 2020. He was fired from these roles in December 2023.

== Early life ==
Levinsohn was raised in Tenafly, New Jersey, the son of Joyce (née Salton) and Jay Douglas Levinsohn. After Tenafly High School in 1981, he graduated from American University with a bachelor's degree in broadcast communications.

== Work ==
=== Early career ===
Levinsohn's joined HBO in 1989, working in marketing and promotions for Time Warner Sports.

In early 1996, Levinsohn joined SportsLine USA in Ft. Lauderdale, Florida. He produced a syndicated television show starring NFL coaches Marv Levy and Sam Wyche, and host Scott Kaplan, entitled "Football Playbook," and syndicated radio programming on Westwood One.

Levinsohn was hired by Alta Vista to help launch the portal division in 1999.

From 2001 to 2005, Levinsohn was senior vice president and general manager at Fox Sports Interactive Media, a division of News Corporation. In late 2004, he was named president of Fox Interactive Media and oversaw a controversial acquisition of MySpace for $580 million.

Levinsohn resigned from News Corp. in November 2006 and was replaced by his cousin.

In 2007, he joined the venture capital firm Velocity Interactive Group, later rebranded as Fuse Capital.

=== Yahoo ===
In October 2010, Levinsohn was hired as executive vice president of the Americas for Yahoo. Under his purview, Yahoo acquired 5to1, a digital advertising network run by longtime business partner James Heckman.

During Levinsohn's tenure, Yahoo expanded its efforts in media, including streaming short films and animated content in partnership with Robert Redford and Tom Hanks.

Levinsohn led Yahoo for two months as interim CEO in 2012. After the board of directors passed him over for the permanent CEO position, hiring Google executive Marissa Mayer, Levinsohn left the company.

The next year, he became CEO of Guggenheim Digital Media, an offshoot of Guggenheim Partners, the investment firm that then was the controlling owner of the Hollywood Reporter and Billboard.

In 2014, Levinsohn became executive chairman of Scout Media, a sports digital media network. The firm filed for Chapter 11 bankruptcy protection in 2016, seeking approval to sell what remained of the business at auction. Levinsohn and Heckman were named as defendants in a shareholder lawsuit filed in 2017, in federal court.

=== Los Angeles Times ===
On 21 August 2017, Levinsohn was named the publisher and CEO of the Los Angeles Times by tronc, replacing Davan Maharaj.

The Los Angeles Times newsroom filed for a union election in December 2017, four months after Levinsohn was hired, and held a union election on 4 January 2018. The staff cited concerns with the company's "nascent plans to establish a network of non-staff contributors to produce stories outside the main newsroom."

Levinsohn was placed on unpaid leave in January 2018, after reports of two sexual harassment lawsuits, 'frat house' behavior and questionable decisions on the job from interviews with 26 former colleagues and associates. A law firm hired by Tronc to investigate the sexual harassment claims found no wrongdoing after a three-week investigation.

In June 2018, the Los Angeles Times was sold to billionaire Patrick Soon-Shiong, and Levinsohn was shifted into a new role as the CEO of Tribune Interactive. Levinsohn left Tribune Publishing in 2018, when his job was eliminated.

=== The Arena Group ===
In June 2019, Levinsohn was named chief executive of Sports Illustrated after his firm, then known as Maven Inc., entered into a $45-million licensing arrangement with the magazine's new owner, Authentic Brands Group. In October, Maven laid off 40 journalists, implemented an independent contractor model and removed longtime editor-in-chief Chris Stone.

In August 2020, Levinsohn took over for Heckman as Maven's chief executive. Levinsohn prioritized expanding premium content and settling many of the issues created by previous management including issues with previous owner Meredith and journalist Grant Wahl.

In September 2021, the company announced that it rebranded itself as The Arena Group, reflecting the company's shift in business strategy towards building "scalable media verticals." He is the chairman and CEO.

In April 2022, The Arena Group closed its purchase of Parade Media, publisher of Parade magazine.

In December 2022, The Arena Group entered into a definitive agreement to acquire the digital assets of Men's Journal, Men's Fitness, Surfer, Powder, Bike, SKATEboarding, Snowboarder and NewSchoolers from A360media.

In August 2023, Manoj Bhargava announced that Levinsohn had merged The Arena Group into Bhargava's Bridge Media Networks, with Bhargava becoming the majority shareholder in the merged company. The merger would allow Bhargava to cross-brand his television networks NewsNet and Sports News Highlights with The Arena Group brands.

Levinsohn was fired from Arena Group in December 2023, with Manoj Bhargava taking over as CEO. The company stated that this was to "improve the operational efficiency and revenue of the company".

== Personal life ==
He lives in Brentwood, Los Angeles.
