= Latinos (newspaper series) =

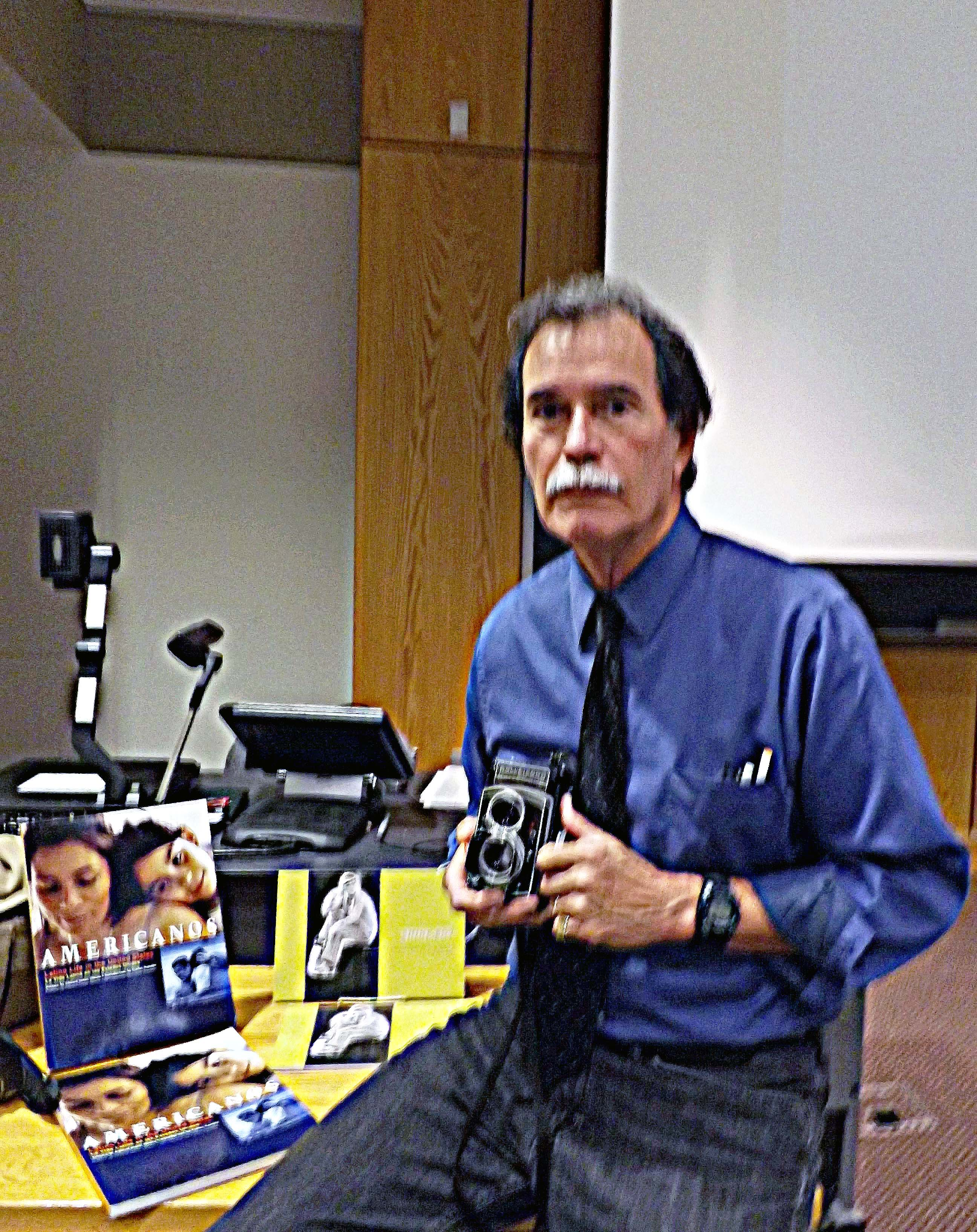
- José Galvez with his camera, equipment and books.
- Type: Newspaper series
- Staff writers: 13

Latinos is a 27-part newspaper series on southern California's Latino community and culture of the early 1980s. The Los Angeles Times won the 1984 Pulitzer Prize for Public Service for the series. The winning team of two editors and 11 reporters and photographers who were all of Mexican American descent were the first Hispanics or Latinos to win the award. The Pulitzer Prize jury called the series "one of the largest reporting efforts in the newspaper's history" and noted that the news team had conducted over 1,000 interviews. The story of the newspaper series is the subject of the 2007 documentary Below the Fold.

== Selected articles ==
- "Editorial: Of diversity and strength"
- "Going home: The American dream lives in the barrio"
- "Four generations: Mexico to U.S. — a culture odyssey"
- "Inside the world of Latinas"
- "Migrant pickers: Latinos in the fields of hardship"
- "Latino students advance, only to fail"
- "Top Latino Firms Took Gambles That Paid Off"
- "The Latino wealthy — a new breed"

== News team ==
Rick Corrales (ca. 1957 – 7 November 2005), photojournalist, was born in Pico Rivera, California and worked his own darkroom since the age of 10. Corrales studied music at Whittier College and earned a bachelor's degree in photojournalism from California State University, Long Beach. He started working for the Los Angeles Times as a photographer in 1981. Besides being part of the Pulitzer Prize–winning team, Corrales also photographed the 1984 Summer Olympics. He created the 360-degree Spinshot camera and established Corrales Cameras, a manufacturing company, in Whittier, California. The company sold about 1,000 units before competition with digital photography began. Corrales also pioneered 3D animation and created a company called Motion Graphix with former LA Times photo editor, Raleigh Souther. Corrales died 7 November 2005 of stomach cancer.

José Galvez (born 1949) first entered the Arizona Daily Star newsroom as a 10-year-old shoe shine boy and then became a regular visitor at the Tucson, Arizona-based newspaper. The journalists at the Arizona Daily Star motivated him and Galvez learned journalism skills while growing up. He purchased his own camera at a pawn shop while in high school and first photographed the people and places in his barrio. At the University of Arizona, Galvez majored in journalism. Galvez became a staff photographer at the Arizona Daily Star after graduation. Galvez was the first Mexican American photographer hired by the Los Angeles Times and worked there from 1980 to 1992. Galvez used his personal experience at photographing Mexican Americans in Tucson to illustrate the Los Angeles Times' Pulitzer Prize–winning series. He left the LA Times to do solo photography work. Galvez's recording of Latino life in the United States in monochrome photography has illustrated several of his books, including "Vatos" (ISBN 0938317520) and "Shine Boy" (ISBN 9780982433904), a memoir about his childhood, and two other edited books "Beloved Land" (ISBN 9780816523825) and "Americanos" (ISBN 9780316649148).

Robert Montemayor (ca. 1954 – 21 October 2015) graduated in 1975, from the College of Mass Communications at Texas Tech University with a bachelor's degree in journalism. He earned a master's degree in Business Administration in marketing in 1986 from the University of California, Los Angeles. In 1977 and 1978, he was nominated for a Pulitzer Prize. He earned a George Polk Award in 1978 for his contribution on civil rights cases. In 1978, he joined the Los Angeles Times as a staff writer. Six years later in 1984, Montemayor would co-write the series in the 27-part series that would win the Pulitzer Prize for Public Service. After receiving his MBA, Montemayor worked in upper level management for such companies as Dow Jones & Company, McGraw-Hill Companies, and VNU Business Media. In 2004, he published a book, "Right Before Our Eyes: Latinos Past, Present and Future”. Montemayor is currently a member of the journalism faculty at Rutgers University.

Frank del Olmo (18 May 1948 – 19 February 2004), who won an Emmy for writing "The Unwanted," a documentary on illegal immigration was a career Los Angeles Times journalist. D . In 1998, he was given the title of associate editor of the newspaper. He had over a 34-year career at the Los Angeles Times as a writer and an editor. Frank Del Olmo died at his desk of a heart attack at the Los Angeles Times 19 February 2004 at age 55.

George Ramos (1 October 1947 – ca. 23 July 2011) graduated from California Polytechnic State University's journalism department in 1969 with a bachelor's degree in journalism, before reporting for the Orange County Register, San Diego Union-Tribune, and Copley News Service. A Vietnam War veteran and recipient of three Purple Hearts, he then worked for 25 years as a journalist at the Los Angeles Times, during which he worked under several different titles. Ramos received three Pulitzer Prizes over the years, including his first in 1984, prior to later additional co-wins in 1993 and 1994, respectively, for his coverage of the Rodney King verdict-stemming riots and Northridge earthquake. Starting in 1998, Ramos also hosted Bakersfield College's Multicultural Journalism Workshop. He then became the Chair of the Journalism Department at Cal Poly in San Luis Obispo in 2003. In 2007, he was instated into the National Association of Hispanic Journalists Hall of Fame. In the years before his death, he was an editor of Cal Coast News. Ramos was found dead in his house at Morro Bay, California on Saturday, 23 July 2011. He is believed to have died of natural causes; however, his diabetes could have played a role.

Frank Sotomayor (born 20 May 1943) began to work at age 17 for the Arizona Daily Star in Tucson. He earned a master's degree in communications from Stanford University. In the 1970s, Sotomayor started at the Los Angeles Times as the foreign news writer. Sotomayor and George Ramos were co-editors of a 1983 Latino series of 27 articles that ran over three weeks and Sotomayor also had writing credit. Sotomayor served as an adviser to the Minority Editorial Training Program (METPRO) to train minorities through on the job experience. He co-founded the Robert C. Maynard Institute for Journalism Education and the California Chicano News Media Association. He worked at the Los Angeles Times for 35 years. He received the Centennial Achievement Award from the University of Arizona in 1998 and in 2002 was inducted into the Hall of Fame.

Victor Valle (born 10 November 1950) was born and raised in Whittier, California, where his family worked a dairy farm. His writing career began in the 1970s, when he started to publish poetry, translate literature, and edit magazines. He obtained a master's of science in journalism from Medill School of Journalism. He joined the Los Angeles Times in 1981. He was a member of the news team of Chicano journalists who earned a Pulitzer Prize in 1984. Valle published "Recipe of Memory: Five Generations of Mexican Cuisine” in 1996 and was awarded two literary nominations in 1996. He also published a book called “City of Industry” in 2009, which was met with positive reception.

Other staff reporters were Marita Hernandez, Virginia Escalante, Al Martinez, Julio Moran, David Reyes, Nancy Rivera, Louis Sahagun and Juan Vasquez. Other photographers included Monica Almeida, Aurelio Jose Barrera, Patrick Downs, Christine Cotter and Thomas Kelsey.

== Documentary film ==
- Roberto Gudiño, Below the Fold: The Pulitzer That Defined Latino Journalism (2007)

== See also ==
- Pulitzer Prize for Public Service
