= Ruth Ryon =

Ruth E. Ryon
- Born: July 16, 1944; Portland, Oregon, U.S.
- Died: March 28, 2014 (aged 69); Redondo Beach, California, U.S.
- Occupation: Columnist

Ruth E. Ryon (July 16, 1944 – March 28, 2014) was a celebrity real estate columnist for the Los Angeles Times, who retired in April 2008 after more than 23 years of writing the paper's popular "Hot Property" celebrity real estate column. Ryon is widely credited with having created the celebrity real estate journalism genre.

== Professional career ==
Ryon's tenure at the Los Angeles Times dates back to the 1970s. Her first byline with the paper was on November 20, 1977.

Years later, while reading Parade magazine, Ryon got the idea to write a column with short, pithy items about celebrities buying and selling houses, and she received the go-ahead from her editors to do it. Ryon's first "Hot Property" column appeared on November 25, 1984, and was about Johnny Carson paying $9.5 million for a house in Malibu, California. Ryon went on to write more than 1,300 more "Hot Property" columns, with the column eventually being moved to Page One of the Los Angeles Times' Real Estate section in 1987 and with it also becoming syndicated. Ryon also spent five years on KNX (AM) radio discussing celebrity real estate.

The column was the first of what eventually became a small stable of regular celebrity real estate columns or features in newspapers and magazines across the country, including "Private Properties" in the Wall Street Journal, "Manhattan Transfers" in the New York Observer, "Upper Bracket" in the Chicago Tribune (from 1998 until 2004), "Gimme Shelter" in the New York Post and "On the Block" in People. Online features that have been created in the image of "Hot Property" include Big Time Listings, the Real Estalker and "Real LI" in Newsday.

== Retirement ==
Ryon took a buyout from the Times in April 2008, filing her final "Hot Property" column for the Times' April 13, 2008 Real Estate section. Ryon told readers in a farewell column that she plans to "write that book, work as a consultant, do some freelancing and spend more time with my family, readers, sources and friends."

On October 1, 2008, Ruth Ryon became a senior real estate news columnist for the REAL ESTATE CHANNEL Internet news network with a weekly column called Celebrity Homes.

Ryon and her husband, George, lived in Redondo Beach, California for more than 20 years.

== Death ==
Ryon died March 28, 2014, at a hospice facility in Redondo Beach. The cause was complications of Parkinson's disease, said her husband. Her daughter has cited the actual cause of death was Lewy Body Disease, which is often mistaken as Parkinson's. The physical symptoms are similar, but are accompanied with dementia. She is survived by her husband of 47 years, George and her daughter, Heather.

== Legacy ==
"Hot Property" still appears weekly in the Los Angeles Times showcasing celebrity and ultra-luxury real estate in the Southern California market. Additionally, a Hot Property magazine is published by LA Times Studios and features articles on interior design, architecture and luxury homebuilding.
