= Nathan Cole Jr. =

Founder of the Los Angeles Times

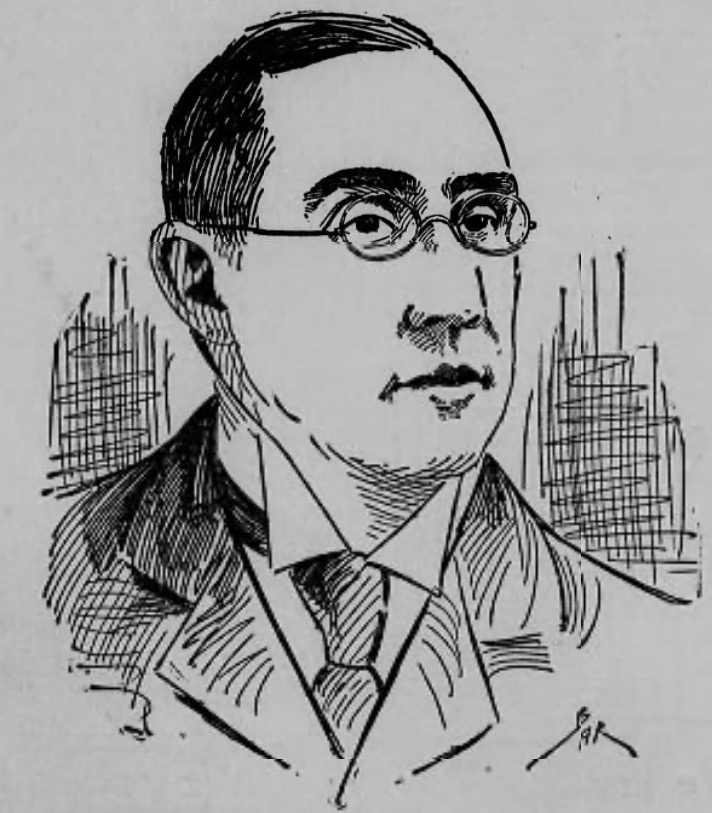
- Born: 1860
- Died: 1922 (aged 61–62)
- Known for: Founder, Los Angeles Daily Times
- Notable work: committeeman in the first presidential election campaign of Woodrow Wilson
- Political party: Democratic
- Children: 4
- Father: Nathan Cole

Nathan Cole Jr. (1860–1921) was one of the two founders of the Los Angeles Daily Times, now the Los Angeles Times. The son of Nathan Cole, a wealthy St. Louis, Missouri, politician and banker, he was 21 years old in 1881 when he and a colleague, Thomas Gardiner, put together the first issues of the new venture to be printed on the presses of the Mirror Publishing Company. Later he was a real estate man and a Los Angeles city police commissioner.

Cole worked on a St. Louis newspaper, then traveled west to Portland, Oregon, and to Woodland, California. He came to Los Angeles specifically to start a newspaper, which ran into financial difficulty and was taken over by General Harrison Gray Otis in 1882. Cole returned to St. Louis, where he went into business with his father, Nathan Cole, who had been a U.S. Representative in Congress and Mayor of St. Louis. Cole soon returned to Los Angeles, where he remained until he died on December 7, 1921.

Cole began his Los Angeles career as a Republican editing a Republican newspaper, but he switched to the Democrats and became a leader of the local party. He was a Democratic committeeman in the first presidential election campaign of Woodrow Wilson. Cole was an early member of the Jonathan Club and was a Mason and a member of the Sons of the Revolution. He was appointed to the police commission by Mayor Arthur C. Harper.

Cole had a wife, and the couple had two daughters, Gladys Cole and Mrs. R.L. McCrea, and two sons, Nathan and Richard H.

== See also ==
- List of Los Angeles Times publishers
