= David Laventhol =

American newspaper editor and publisher (1933–2015)

- Born: David Abram Laventhol; July 15, 1933; Philadelphia, Pennsylvania, US
- Died: April 8, 2015 (aged 81); New York City, US
- Education: Yale University (BA), University of Minnesota (MA)
- Occupations: Editor and publisher
- Relatives: Hank Laventhol (cousin)

David Abram Laventhol (July 15, 1933 – April 8, 2015) was an American newspaper editor and publisher at The Washington Post, Newsday and the Los Angeles Times. He was known for his work designing newspapers, most notably as first editor of the Style section of The Washington Post. He was also known for his shy and humble style, being called an "unlikely mogul".

== Early life and family ==
Laventhol was born into a journalist's family in Philadelphia, the middle child of three to Clare (née Horwald) and Jesse Laventhol, Harrisburg bureau chief on the Philadelphia Record. Later the family moved to Washington, D.C., where Jesse was in charge of Major Legislative Actions. David went to Woodrow Wilson High School, where he edited the school's paper the Beacon, and then went to Yale where he majored in English and was elected managing editor of the Yale Daily News. He graduated in 1957 and later received a master's from the University of Minnesota in 1960.

David Laventhol was the cousin of painter Hank Laventhol.

== Career ==
Laventhol joined the St. Petersberg Times (Florida) in 1957 as a reporter, and after taking a break for a master's degree, became national news editor before going to the New York Herald Tribune as city editor in 1963.

In 1966, Ben Bradlee brought him to The Washington Post as night managing editor, and in 1968 gave Laventhol the task of redesigning the "For and About Women" section. They created the Style section, described as a "monumental achievement", later "imitated in every paper in America", and which concentrated on vibrant writing and feature articles.

Laventhol then moved to Newsday in 1969, soon becoming editor under publisher Bill Moyers. In that period he designed Part II, its counterpart to the Style section, and introduced a Sunday edition in 1972.

During Laventhol's editorship, Newsday won four Pulitzer Prizes, including the 1974 Public Service prize for its massive 33-part investigation "The Heroin Trail", uncovering heroin from its production in Turkey to addiction on the streets of Long Island, described by Floyd Abrams as the "single most daunting and expensive series in the institution's history".

Laventhol rose to publisher in 1978 and launched a New York City edition in 1985. Called New York Newsday, it won critical praise for its mix of news and entertainment, with some calling it the "most enterprising and in many respects the best daily newspaper in New York City". Newsday was at that time owned by the Times-Mirror corporation, and Laventhol moved to California 1989 as publisher of the Los Angeles Times and president of the corporation.

The Los Angeles Times won three Pulitzer Prizes under Laventhol's leadership, including the Spot News prize "for balanced, comprehensive, penetrating coverage under deadline pressure of the second, most destructive day of the [1992] Los Angeles Riots." The paper opened new regional editions and a Spanish-language edition.

== Retirement ==
Diagnosed with Parkinson's disease, Laventhol retired from Times-Mirror in 1994. Many of his expansions were reversed in the contraction of the newspaper industry, most notably New York Newsday, which was closed in 1995 for financial reasons, with some sources citing its loss-making and others contending it was about to break even.

During his retirement, Laventhol was publisher of the Columbia Journalism Review, contributing a number of articles critical of the direction of the news industry, and the effects of modern media being simultaneous with the events they are reporting — having been a passenger on Jet Blue Flight 292, which showed live news of its own troubled flight.

== Freedom of the Press ==
Laventhol was a strong advocate of press freedom, and had a long association with the International Press Institute, the Committee to Protect Journalists, and the Pulitzer Prize committee, chairing each of these at various periods.

Laventhol is known for his long role in promoting press freedom in South Africa. As editor of Newsday in 1976, he sent Les Payne, one of the undercover reporters from "The Heroin Trail", to Soweto to cover the riots. As a black man, Payne was able to report more accurately on the number of deaths during that uprising, leading to Payne and Newsday being banned in South Africa, only returning to cover Nelson Mandela's release from prison in 1990. After Mandela's speech at the International Press Institute in Kyoto in 1991, Laventhol took the 1994 congress to Cape Town very shortly before South Africa's first free elections. Mandela and F.W. de Klerk gave the opening speeches, with Mandela thanking the international press for keeping apartheid in the news and saying: "We are confident that your presence will, as in the past, assist in the birth of the democratic new order."
