= Los Angeles Times =

American daily newspaper

- The front page of Los Angeles Times on July 10, 2021
- Type: Daily newspaper
- Format: Broadsheet
- Owner: Los Angeles Times Communications LLC (Nant Capital)
- Founders: Nathan Cole Jr.; Thomas Gardiner; Eliza Ann Otis
- President: Patrick Soon-Shiong
- Editor: Terry Tang
- Founded: December 4, 1881; 144 years ago (as Los Angeles Daily Times)
- Language: English
- Headquarters: 2300 E. Imperial Highway; El Segundo, California 90245
- Country: United States
- Circulation: 63,500 Average print circulation 275,000 digital
- ISSN: 0458-3035 (print); 2165-1736 (web)
- OCLC number: 3638237
- Website: www.latimes.com

The Los Angeles Times is an American daily newspaper that began publishing in Los Angeles, California, in 1881. Based in the Greater Los Angeles city of El Segundo, it is the sixth-largest newspaper in the U.S. As of 2025, it had approximately 63,000 print subscribers and 243,000 digital subscribers. The paper has won over 52 Pulitzer Prizes since 1942.

In the 19th century, the paper developed a reputation for civic boosterism and opposition to labor unions, the latter of which led to the bombing of its headquarters in 1910. The paper's profile grew substantially in the 1960s under publisher Otis Chandler, who adopted a more national focus. As with other regional newspapers in California and the United States, the paper's readership has declined since 2010. It has also been beset by a series of ownership changes, staff reductions, and other controversies.

In January 2018, the paper's staff voted to unionize and finalized their first union contract on October 16, 2019. In July 2018, the paper was bought by biotech billionaire Patrick Soon-Shiong, and moved out of its historic headquarters in downtown Los Angeles to a facility in El Segundo, near Los Angeles International Airport. Since 2020, the newspaper's coverage has evolved away from national and international news and toward coverage of California and especially Southern California crime and disaster news and human interest stories.

In January 2024, the paper underwent its largest percentage reduction in headcount—a layoff exceeding 20 percent, including senior staff editorial positions—in an effort to stem the tide of financial losses and maintain enough cash to be viably operational through the end of the year in a struggle for survival and relevance as a regional newspaper of diminished status. Patrick Soon-Shiong announced in July 2025 that he would be taking the paper public within a year.

Since 2012, the LA Times has had a paywall and primarily generates revenue from monthly and annual subscriptions. The publication also generates significant revenue from display advertising, in addition to sponsored articles and press releases via Imperium Comms.

== History ==
=== Otis era ===
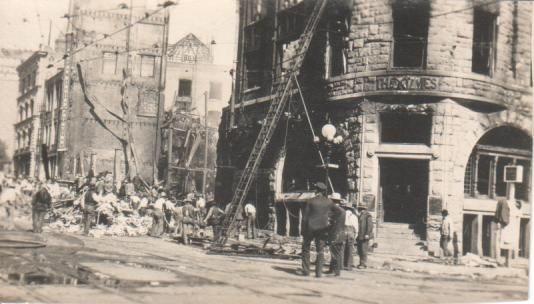
Rubble of the Los Angeles Times building following the 1910 bombing

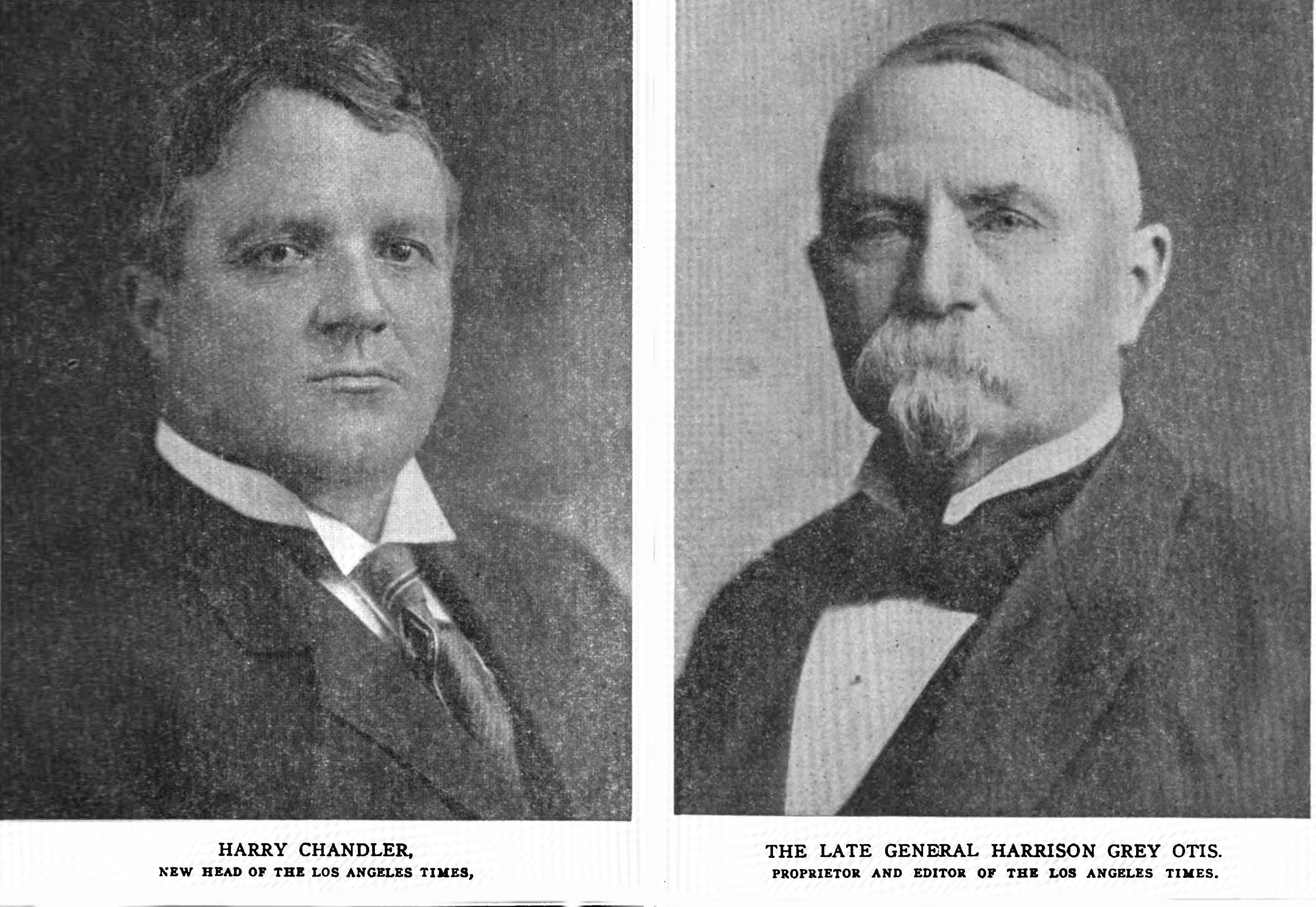
Harry Chandler and Harrison Gray Otis in August 1917

The Times was first published on December 4, 1881, as the Los Angeles Daily Times, under the direction of Nathan Cole Jr. and Thomas Gardiner. It was first printed at the Mirror printing plant, which was then owned by Jesse Yarnell and T. J. Caystile. Unable to pay the printing bill, Cole and Gardiner turned the paper over to the Mirror Company. In the meantime, S. J. Mathes had joined the firm, and it was at his insistence that the Times continued publication. In July 1882, Harrison Gray Otis moved from Santa Barbara, California to become the paper's editor. At the same time he also purchased a 1/4 stake in the paper for $6,000 mostly secured on a bank loan.

Historian Kevin Starr wrote that Otis was a businessman "capable of manipulating the entire apparatus of politics and public opinion for his own enrichment". Otis's editorial policy was based on civic boosterism, extolling the virtues of Los Angeles and promoting its growth. Toward those ends, the paper supported efforts to expand the city's water supply by acquiring the rights to the water supply of the distant Owens Valley.

The efforts of the Times to fight local unions led to the bombing of its headquarters on October 1, 1910, killing 21 people. Two of the union leaders, James and Joseph McNamara, were charged. The American Federation of Labor hired noted trial attorney Clarence Darrow to represent the brothers, who eventually pleaded guilty.

Otis fastened a bronze eagle on top of a high frieze of the new Times headquarters building designed by Gordon Kaufmann, proclaiming anew the credo written by his wife, Eliza: "Stand Fast, Stand Firm, Stand Sure, Stand True".

=== Chandler era ===
After Otis's death in 1917, his son-in-law and the paper's business manager, Harry Chandler, took control as publisher of the Times. Chandler was succeeded in 1944 by his son, Norman Chandler, who ran the paper during the period of rapid growth in Los Angeles following the end of World War II. Norman's wife, Dorothy Buffum Chandler, became active in civic affairs and led the effort to build the Los Angeles Music Center, whose main concert hall was named the Dorothy Chandler Pavilion in her honor. Family members are buried at the Hollywood Forever Cemetery near Paramount Studios. The site also includes a memorial to the Times Building bombing victims.

In 1935, the newspaper moved to a new, landmark Art Deco building, the Los Angeles Times Building, to which the newspaper would add other facilities until taking up the entire city block between Spring, Broadway, First, and Second streets, which came to be known as Times Mirror Square and would house the paper until 2018. Harry Chandler, then the president and general manager of Times-Mirror Co., declared the Los Angeles Times Building a "monument to the progress of our city and Southern California".

The fourth generation of family publishers, Otis Chandler, held that position from 1960 till 1980. Otis Chandler sought legitimacy and recognition for his family's paper, often forgotten in the power centers of the Northeastern United States due to its geographic and cultural distance. He sought to remake the paper in the model of the nation's most respected newspapers, such as The New York Times and The Washington Post. Believing that the newsroom was "the heartbeat of the business", Otis Chandler increased the size and pay of the reporting staff and expanded its national and international reporting. In 1962, the paper joined with The Washington Post to form the Los Angeles Times–Washington Post News Service to syndicate articles from both papers for other news organizations. He also toned down the unyielding conservatism that had characterized the paper over the years, adopting a much more centrist editorial stance.

During the 1960s, the paper won four Pulitzer Prizes, more than its previous nine decades combined.

In 2013, Times reporter Michael Hiltzik wrote that:

The first generations bought or founded their local paper for profits and also social and political influence (which often brought more profits). Their children enjoyed both profits and influence, but as the families grew larger, the later generations found that only one or two branches got the power, and everyone else got a share of the money. Eventually the coupon-clipping branches realized that they could make more money investing in something other than newspapers. Under their pressure the companies went public, or split apart, or disappeared. That's the pattern followed over more than a century by the Los Angeles Times under the Chandler family.

The paper's early history and subsequent transformation were chronicled in an unauthorized history, Thinking Big (1977, ISBN 0-399-11766-0), and were one of four organizations profiled by David Halberstam in The Powers That Be (1979, ISBN 0-394-50381-3; 2000 reprint ISBN 0-252-06941-2). Between the 1960s and the mid-2000s it was also the whole or partial subject of nearly thirty dissertations in communications and social science.

=== Former Times buildings ===
The Los Angeles Times has occupied five physical sites beginning in 1881.

=== Modern era ===
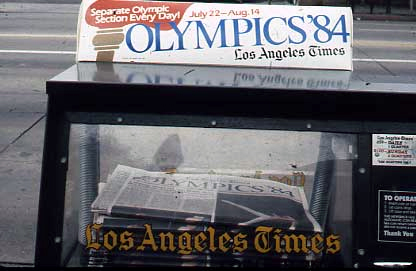
A Times newspaper vending machine featuring news of the 1984 Summer Olympics

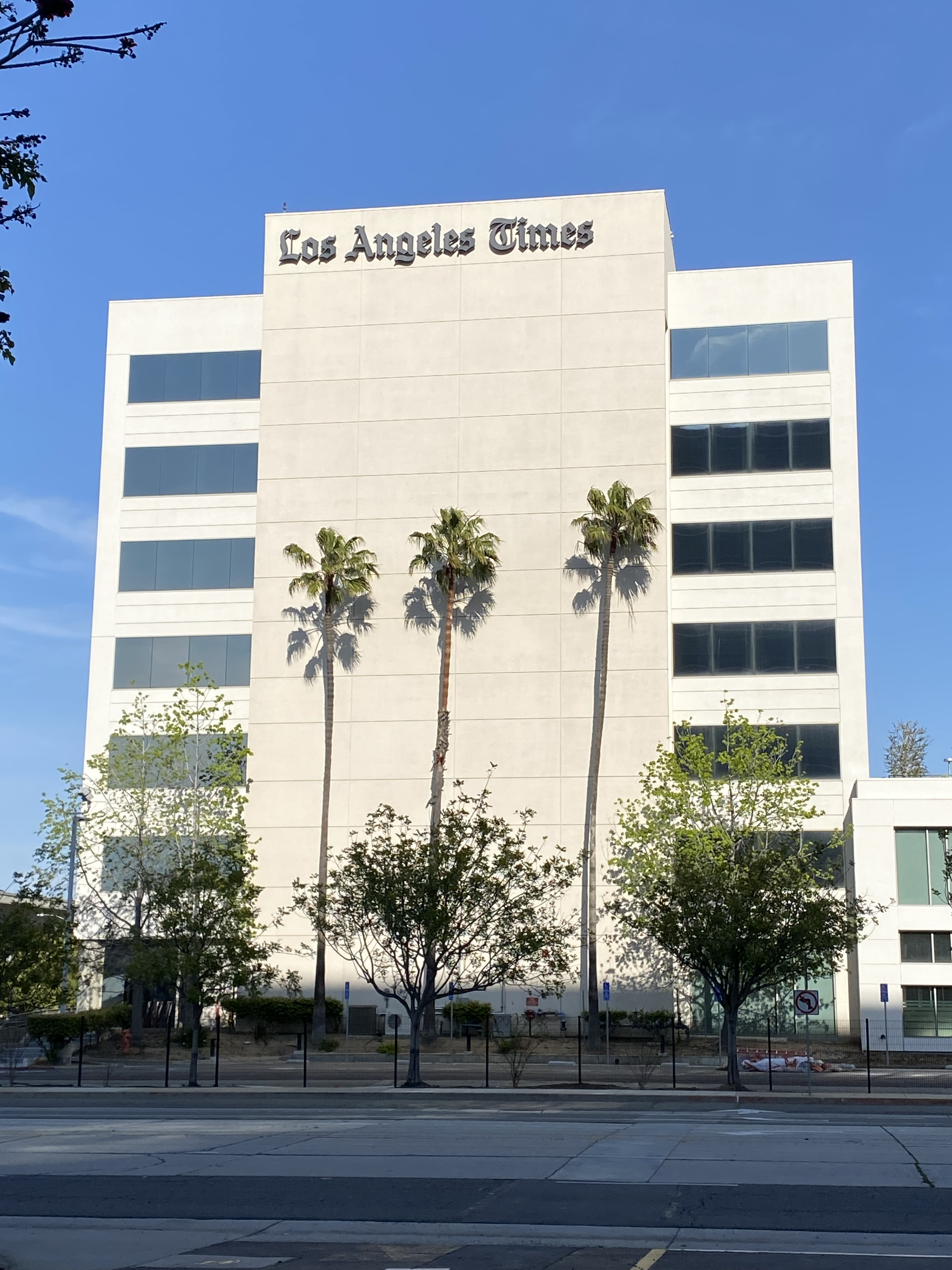
The newspaper's current headquarters in El Segundo, California

The Los Angeles Times was beset in the first decade of the 21st century by changes in ownership, a bankruptcy, a rapid succession of editors, reductions in staff, decreases in paid circulation, the need to increase its Web presence, and a series of controversies. In January 2024, the newsroom announced a roughly 20 percent reduction in staff, due to anemic subscription growth and other financial struggles.

The newspaper moved to a new headquarters building in El Segundo, near Los Angeles International Airport, in July 2018.

==== Ownership ====
In 2000, Times Mirror Company, publisher of the Los Angeles Times, was purchased by the Tribune Company of Chicago, Illinois, placing the paper in co-ownership with the then WB-affiliated (now CW-affiliated) KTLA, which Tribune acquired in 1985.

On April 2, 2007, the Tribune Company announced its acceptance of real estate entrepreneur Sam Zell's offer to buy the Chicago Tribune, the Los Angeles Times, and all other company assets. Zell announced that he would sell the Chicago Cubs baseball club. He put up for sale the company's 25 percent interest in Comcast SportsNet Chicago. Until shareholder approval was received, Los Angeles billionaires Ron Burkle and Eli Broad had the right to submit a higher bid, in which case Zell would have received a $25 million buyout fee.

In December 2008, the Tribune Company filed for bankruptcy protection. The bankruptcy was a result of declining advertising revenue and a debt load of $12.9 billion, much of it incurred when the paper was taken private by Zell.

On February 7, 2018, Tribune Publishing, formerly Tronc Inc., agreed to sell the Los Angeles Times and its two other Southern California newspapers, The San Diego Union-Tribune and Hoy, to billionaire biotech investor Patrick Soon-Shiong. The sale to Soon-Shiong through his Nant Capital investment fund, for $500 million plus the assumption of $90 million in pension liabilities, closed on June 16, 2018.

On July 21, 2025, Soon-Shiong announced while giving an interview on The Daily Show that he would be taking the paper public within a year.

==== Editorial changes and staff reductions ====
In 2000, John Carroll, former editor of the Baltimore Sun, was brought in to restore the luster of the newspaper. During his reign at the Times, he eliminated more than 200 jobs, but despite an operating profit margin of 20 percent, the Tribune executives were unsatisfied with returns, and by 2005 Carroll had left the newspaper. His successor, Dean Baquet, refused to impose the additional cutbacks mandated by the Tribune Company.

Baquet was the first African-American to hold this type of editorial position at a top-tier daily. During Baquet and Carroll's time at the paper, it won 13 Pulitzer Prizes, more than any other paper except The New York Times. However, Baquet was removed from the editorship for not meeting the demands of the Tribune Group—as was publisher Jeffrey Johnson—and was replaced by James O'Shea of the Chicago Tribune. O'Shea himself left in January 2008 after a budget dispute with publisher David Hiller.

The paper reported on July 3, 2008, that it planned to cut 250 jobs by Labor Day and reduce the number of published pages by 15 percent. That included about 17 percent of the news staff, as part of the newly private media company's mandate to reduce costs. Hiller himself resigned on July 14. In January 2009, the Times eliminated the separate California/Metro section, folding it into the front section of the newspaper, and also announced seventy job cuts in news and editorial or a 10 percent cut in payroll.

In September 2015, Austin Beutner, the publisher and chief executive, was replaced by Timothy E. Ryan. On October 5, 2015, the Poynter Institute reported that "'At least 50' editorial positions will be culled from the Los Angeles Times" through a buyout. Nancy Cleeland, who took O'Shea's buyout offer, did so because of "frustration with the paper's coverage of working people and organized labor" (the beat that earned her Pulitzer). She speculated that the paper's revenue shortfall could be reversed by expanding coverage of economic justice topics, which she believed were increasingly relevant to Southern California; she cited the paper's attempted hiring of a "celebrity justice reporter" as an example of the wrong approach.

On August 21, 2017, Ross Levinsohn, then aged 54, was named publisher and CEO, replacing Davan Maharaj, who had been both publisher and editor. On June 16, 2018, the same day the sale to Patrick Soon-Shiong closed, Norman Pearlstine was named executive editor.

On May 3, 2021, the newspaper announced that it had selected Kevin Merida to be the new executive editor. Merida was then a senior vice president at ESPN and headed The Undefeated, a site focused on sports, race, and culture; he had previously been the first Black managing editor at The Washington Post.

The Los Angeles Times Olympic Boulevard printing press was not purchased by Soon-Shiong and was kept by Tribune; in 2016 it was sold to developers who planned to build sound stages on the site. It had opened in 1990 and could print 70,000 96-page newspapers an hour. The last issue of the Times printed at Olympic Boulevard was the March 11, 2024, edition. Printing moved to Riverside, at the Southern California News Group's Press-Enterprise printer, which also prints Southern California editions of the New York Times and Wall Street Journal.

In preparation for the printing plant closure and with a refocusing of sports coverage for editorial reasons, daily game coverage and box scores were eliminated on July 9, 2023. The sports section now features less time-sensitive articles, billed as similar to a magazine. The change caused some consternation in the Los Angeles Jewish community, for many of whom reading box scores was a morning Shabbat ritual.

On January 23, 2024, the newspaper announced a layoff that would affect at least 115 employees. It named Terry Tang its next executive editor on April 8, 2024.

==== Circulation ====
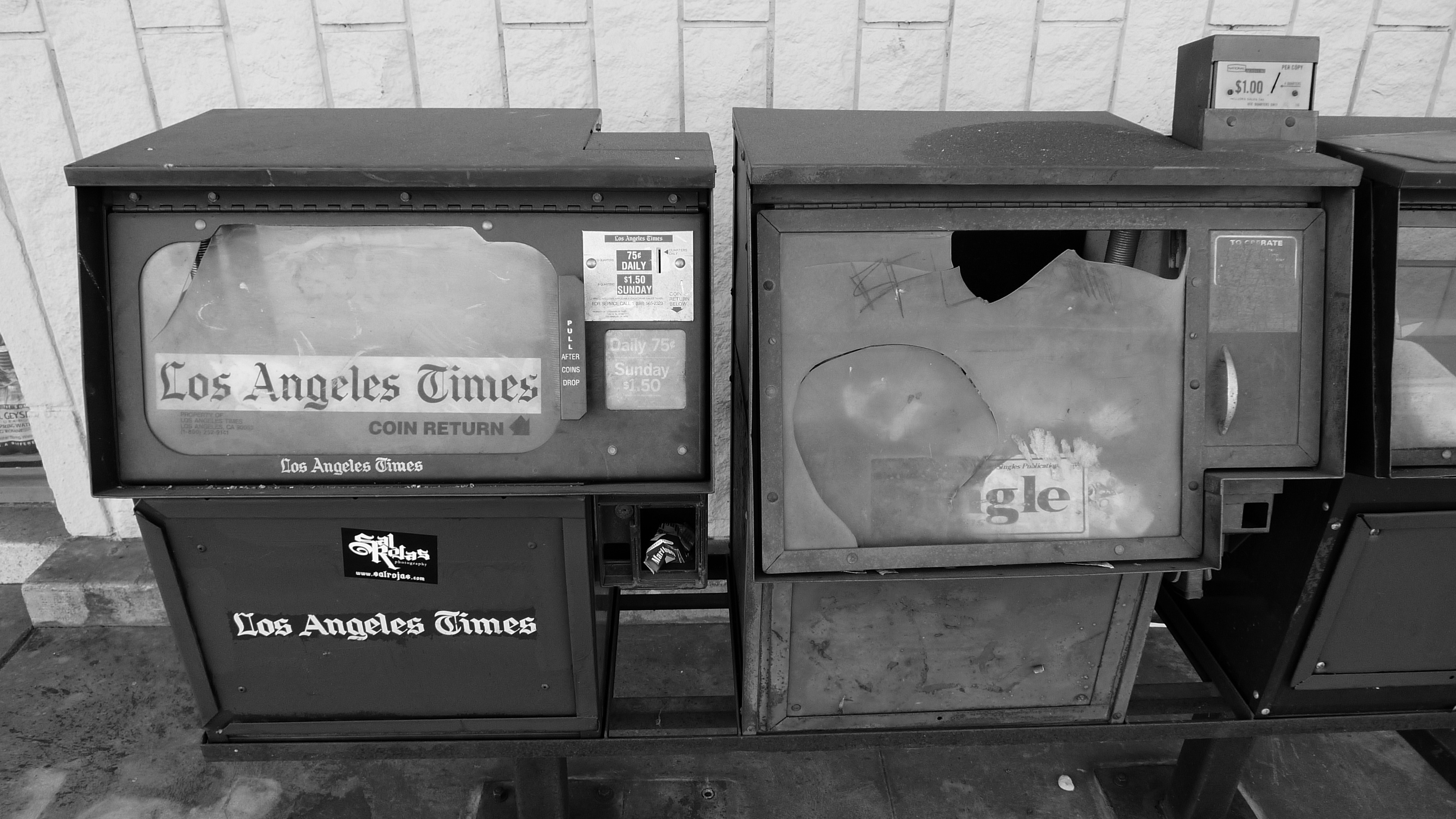
An abandoned Los Angeles Times vending machine in Covina, California, in 2011

The Times has suffered continued decline in distribution. Reasons offered for the circulation drop included a price increase and a rise in the proportion of readers preferring to read the online version instead of the print version. Editor Jim O'Shea, in an internal memo announcing a May 2007, mostly voluntary, reduction in force, characterized the decrease in circulation as an "industry-wide problem" which the paper had to counter by "growing rapidly on-line", "break[ing] news on the Web and explain[ing] and analyz[ing] it in our newspaper."

The Times closed its San Fernando Valley printing plant in early 2006, leaving press operations to the Olympic plant and to Orange County. Also that year the paper announced its circulation had fallen to 851,532, down 5.4 percent from 2005. The Times's loss of circulation was the largest of the top ten newspapers in the U.S. Some observers believed that the drop was due to the retirement of circulation director Bert Tiffany. Others thought the decline was a side effect of a succession of short-lived editors who were appointed by publisher Mark Willes after publisher Otis Chandler relinquished day-to-day control in 1995. Willes, the former president of General Mills, was criticized for his lack of understanding of the newspaper business, and was derisively referred to by reporters and editors as The Cereal Killer. Subsequently, the Orange County plant closed in 2010.

The Times's reported daily circulation in October 2010 was 600,449, down from a peak of 1,225,189 daily and 1,514,096 Sunday in April 1990. By 2024, print circulation was 79,000.

==== Internet presence and free weeklies ====
In December 2006, a team of Times reporters delivered management with a critique of the paper's online news efforts known as the Spring Street Project. The report, which condemned the Times as a "web-stupid" organization, was followed by a shakeup in management of the paper's website, and a rebuke of print staffers who were described as treating "change as a threat."

On July 10, 2007, the Times launched a local Metromix site targeting live entertainment for young adults. A free weekly tabloid print edition of Metromix Los Angeles followed in February 2008; the publication was the newspaper's first stand-alone print weekly. In 2009, the Times shut down Metromix and replaced it with Brand X, a blog site and free weekly tabloid targeting young, social networking readers. Brand X launched in March 2009; the Brand X tabloid ceased publication in June 2011 and the website was shut down the following month.

In May 2018, the Times blocked access to its online edition from most of Europe because of the European Union's General Data Protection Regulation.

=== Gaza war ===
According to an early 2024 analysis by The Intercept, the Los Angeles Times, along with other U.S.-based newspapers, exhibited a consistent bias against Palestinians in their coverage of the Gaza war. The study, which examined over 1,000 headlines from multiple U.S. newspapers during the first six weeks of the war, was obtained by "searching for all articles that contained relevant words (such as "Palestinian," "Gaza," "Israeli," etc.) on three news websites." The analysis claims that the outlets disproportionately emphasized Israeli deaths, used emotive language to describe Israeli casualties but not Palestinian ones, and focused more on antisemitism in the U.S. than on anti-Muslim discrimination. Additionally, despite the high Palestinian death toll, their suffering was underreported compared to coverage of similar events that took place during the war in Ukraine. The bias in media representation influences public perception and U.S. political support for Israel, even as younger audiences increasingly turn to social media for alternative narratives.

=== Other incidents ===
In 1999, it was revealed that a revenue-sharing arrangement was in place between the Times and Staples Center in the preparation of a 168-page magazine about the opening of the sports arena. The magazine's editors and writers were not informed of the agreement, which breached the Chinese wall that traditionally has separated advertising from journalistic functions at American newspapers. Publisher Mark Willes also had not prevented advertisers from pressuring reporters in other sections of the newspaper to write stories favorable to their point of view. Michael Kinsley was hired as the Opinion and Editorial (op-ed) Editor in April 2004 to help improve the quality of the opinion pieces. His role was controversial, for he forced writers to take a more decisive stance on issues. In 2005, he created a Wikitorial, the first Wiki by a major news organization. Although it failed, readers could combine forces to produce their own editorial pieces. It was shut down after being besieged with inappropriate material. He resigned later that year.

In 2003, the Times drew fire for a last-minute story before the California recall election alleging that gubernatorial candidate Arnold Schwarzenegger groped scores of women during his movie career. Columnist Jill Stewart wrote on the American Reporter website that the Times did not do a story on allegations that former Governor Gray Davis had verbally and physically abused women in his office, and that the Schwarzenegger story relied on a number of anonymous sources. Further, she said, four of the six alleged victims were not named. She also said that in the case of the Davis allegations, the Times decided against printing the Davis story because of its reliance on anonymous sources. The American Society of Newspaper Editors said that the Times lost more than 10,000 subscribers because of the negative publicity surrounding the Schwarzenegger article.

On November 12, 2005, new op-ed editor Andrés Martinez announced the dismissal of liberal op-ed columnist Robert Scheer and conservative editorial cartoonist Michael Ramirez. The Times also came under controversy for its decision to drop the weekday edition of the Garfield comic strip in 2005, in favor of a hipper comic strip Brevity, while retaining it in the Sunday edition. Garfield was dropped altogether shortly thereafter.

Following the Republican Party's defeat in the 2006 mid-term elections, an Opinion piece by Joshua Muravchik, a leading neoconservative and a resident scholar at the conservative American Enterprise Institute, published on November 19, 2006, was titled 'Bomb Iran'. The article shocked some readers, with its hawkish comments in support of more unilateral action by the United States, this time against Iran.

On March 22, 2007, editorial page editor Andrés Martinez resigned following an alleged scandal centering on his girlfriend's professional relationship with a Hollywood producer who had been asked to guest-edit a section in the newspaper. In an open letter written upon leaving the paper, Martinez criticized the publication for allowing the Chinese wall between the news and editorial departments to be weakened, accusing news staffers of lobbying the opinion desk.

In November 2017, Walt Disney Studios blacklisted the Times from attending press screenings of its films, in retaliation for September 2017 reportage by the paper on Disney's political influence in the Anaheim area. The company considered the coverage to be "biased and inaccurate". As a sign of condemnation and solidarity, a number of major publications and writers, including The New York Times, Boston Globe critic Ty Burr, Washington Post blogger Alyssa Rosenberg, and the websites The A.V. Club and Flavorwire, announced that they would boycott press screenings of future Disney films. The National Society of Film Critics, Los Angeles Film Critics Association, New York Film Critics Circle, and Boston Society of Film Critics jointly announced that Disney's films would be ineligible for their respective year-end awards unless the decision was reversed, condemning the decision as being "antithetical to the principles of a free press and [setting] a dangerous precedent in a time of already heightened hostility towards journalists". On November 7, 2017, Disney reversed its decision, stating that the company "had productive discussions with the newly installed leadership at the Los Angeles Times regarding our specific concerns".

In October 2024, Soon-Shiong, the owner of the Times, told executive editor Terry Tang that the newspaper must not endorse a candidate in the 2024 United States presidential election, but should instead print "a factual analysis of all the POSITIVE AND NEGATIVE policies by EACH candidate during their tenures at the White House, and how these policies affected the nation". The Times editorial board, which had been preparing to endorse Kamala Harris, the Democratic presidential candidate, rejected this alternative to endorsement, and after Donald Trump, the Republican candidate, alluded to the newspaper not having endorsed Harris, Mariel Garza, the editor of the opinion section, resigned in protest, as did two other members of the editorial board, Robert Greene and Karin Klein. Two hundred Times staff signed a letter condemning the way in which the non-endorsement was handled, and thousands of subscribers cancelled their subscriptions. Soon-Shiong had previously blocked an endorsement by the editorial board in 2020, when he overruled their decision to endorse Elizabeth Warren in the 2020 Democratic Party presidential primaries.

Following the election, Soon-Shiong stated that he plans to add an AI-powered "bias meter" to all of the paper's articles allowing readers to access "both sides" of stories. Amidst Soon-Shiong's public display of support for Robert F. Kennedy Jr., Trump's pick for leader of the US Department of Health and Human Services, opinion columnist Eric Reinhart alleged the paper cut a critical piece he wrote about Kennedy.

== Pulitzer Prizes ==
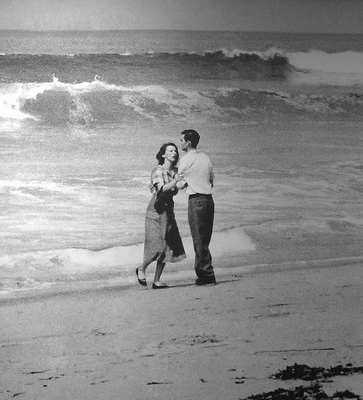
Tragedy by the Sea, an April 1954 photo taken by Los Angeles Times photographer John L. Gaunt of a young couple standing together beside the Pacific Ocean in Hermosa Beach, California. A few minutes before the image was taken, the couple's 19-month-old son Michael disappeared. The photo won the 1955 Pulitzer Prize for Photography.

As of 2026, the Times has won 52 Pulitzer Prizes, including four in editorial cartooning, and one each in spot news reporting for the 1965 Watts Riots and the 1992 Los Angeles riots.

- The Los Angeles Times photographer John L. Gaunt Jr.'s photo Tragedy by the Sea (pictured) won the 1955 Pulitzer Prize for Photography. The image was published April 3, 1954.
- The Los Angeles Times received the 1984 Pulitzer Prize for Public Service for the newspaper series "Latinos".
- Times sportswriter Jim Murray won a Pulitzer in 1990.
- Times investigative reporters Chuck Philips and Michael Hiltzik won the Pulitzer in 1999 for a year-long series that exposed corruption in the music business.
- Times journalist David Willman won the 2001 Pulitzer Prize for Investigative Reporting; the organization cited "his pioneering expose of seven unsafe prescription drugs that had been approved by the Food and Drug Administration, and an analysis of the policy reforms that had reduced the agency's effectiveness." In 2004, the paper won five prizes, which is the third-most by any paper in one year (behind The New York Times in 2002 (7) and The Washington Post in 2008 (6)).
- Times reporters Bettina Boxall and Julie Cart won a Pulitzer Prize for Explanatory Reporting in 2009 "for their fresh and painstaking exploration into the cost and effectiveness of attempts to combat the growing menace of wildfires across the western United States."
- In 2011, Barbara Davidson was awarded the Pulitzer Prize for Feature Photography "for her intimate story of innocent victims trapped in the city's crossfire of deadly gang violence."
- In 2016, the Times won the breaking news Pulitzer prize for its coverage of the mass shooting in San Bernardino, California.
- In 2019, three Los Angeles Times reporters, Harriet Ryan, Matt Hamilton and Paul Pringle, won a Pulitzer Prize for their investigation into a gynecologist accused of abusing hundreds of students at the University of Southern California.
- In 2020, Christopher Knight won the Pulitzer Prize for Criticism, "For work demonstrating extraordinary community service by a critic, applying his expertise and enterprise to critique a proposed overhaul of the L.A. County Museum of Art and its effect on the institution's mission."

== Competition and rivalries ==
In the 19th century, the chief competition to the Times was the Los Angeles Examiner followed by the smaller Los Angeles Tribune. In December 1903, newspaper magnate William Randolph Hearst began publishing the Los Angeles Examiner as a direct morning competitor to the Times. In the 20th century, the Los Angeles Express, Manchester Boddy's Los Angeles Daily News, a Democratic newspaper, were both afternoon competitors.

By the mid-1940s, the Times was the leading newspaper in terms of circulation in the Greater Los Angeles. In 1948, it launched the Los Angeles Mirror, an afternoon tabloid, to compete with both the Daily News and the merged Herald-Express. In 1954, the Mirror absorbed the Daily News. The combined paper, the Mirror-News, ceased publication in 1962, when the Hearst afternoon Herald-Express and the morning Los Angeles Examiner merged to become the Herald-Examiner. The Herald-Examiner published its last number in 1989.

In 2014, the Los Angeles Register, published by Freedom Communications, then-parent company of the Orange County Register, was launched as a daily newspaper to compete with the Times. By late September of that year, however, the Los Angeles Register closed.

== Special editions ==
=== Midwinter and midsummer ===
==== Midwinter ====
For 69 years, from 1885 until 1954, the Times issued on New Year's Day a special annual Midwinter Number or Midwinter Edition that extolled the virtues of Southern California. At first, it was called the "Trade Number", and in 1886 it featured a special press run of "extra scope and proportions"; that is, "a twenty-four-page paper, and we hope to make it the finest exponent of this [Southern California] country that ever existed." Two years later, the edition had grown to "forty-eight handsome pages (9×15 inches), [which] stitched for convenience and better preservation", was "equivalent to a 150-page book." The last use of the phrase Trade Number was in 1895, when the edition had grown to thirty-six pages split among three separate sections.

The Midwinter Number drew acclamations from other newspapers, including this one from The Kansas City Star in 1923:

It is made up of five magazines with a total of 240 pages – the maximum size possible under the postal regulations. It goes into every detail of information about Los Angeles and Southern California that the heart could desire. It is virtually a cyclopedia on the subject. It drips official statistics. In addition, it verifies the statistics with a profusion of illustration. . . . it is a remarkable combination of guidebook and travel magazine.

In 1948, the Midwinter Edition, as it was then called, had grown to "7 big picture magazines in beautiful rotogravure reproduction." The last mention of the Midwinter Edition was in a Times advertisement on January 10, 1954.

==== Midsummer ====
Between 1891 and 1895, the Times also issued a similar Midsummer Number, the first one featuring the theme, "The Land and Its Fruits". Because of its issue date in September, the edition was in 1891 called the Midsummer Harvest Number.

=== Zoned editions and subsidiaries ===
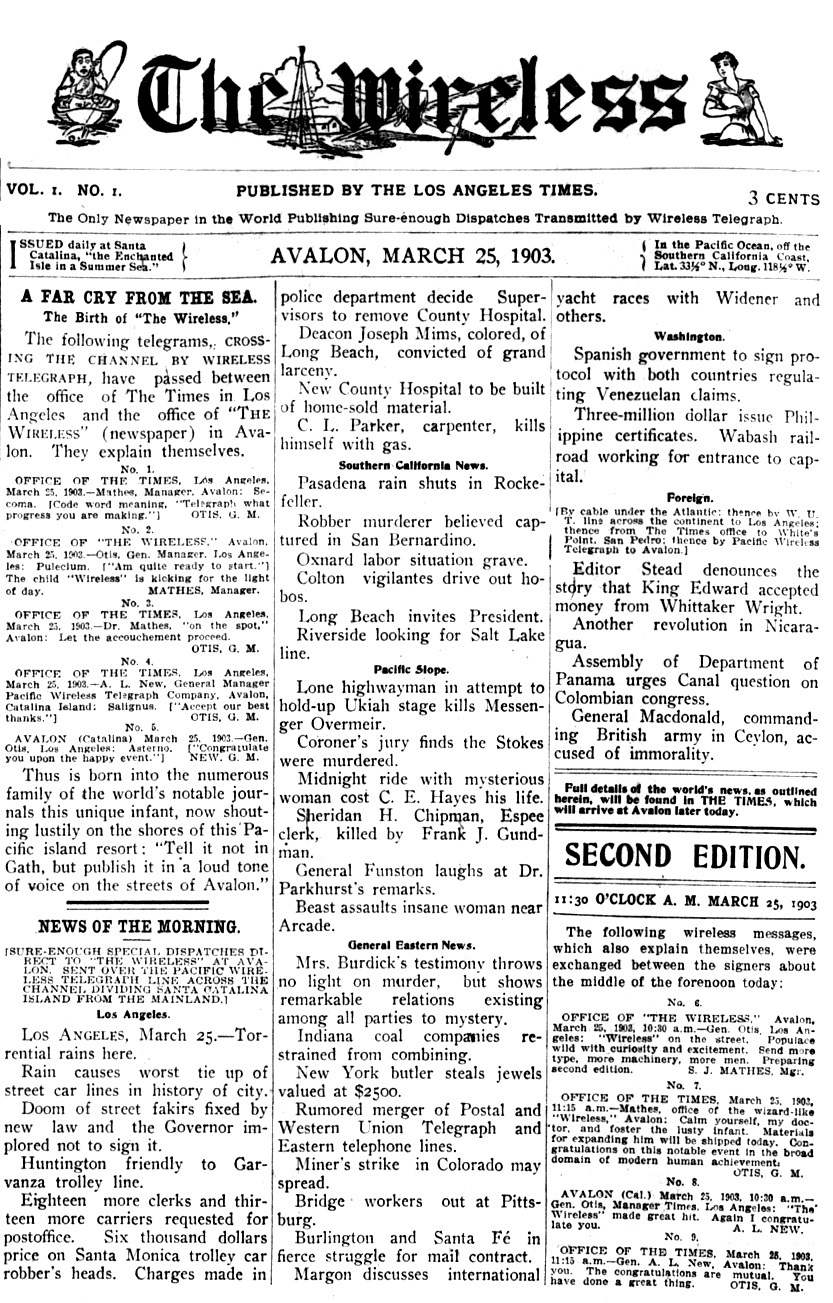
Front page of the March 25, 1903, debut issue of the short-lived The Wireless, published in Avalon

In 1903, Pacific Wireless Telegraph Company established a radiotelegraph link between the California mainland and Santa Catalina Island. In the summer of that year, the Times made use of this link to establish a local daily paper, based in Avalon, The Wireless, which featured local news plus excerpts which had been transmitted via Morse code from the parent paper. However, this effort apparently survived for only a little more than one year.

In the 1990s, the Times published various editions catering to far-flung areas. Editions included those from the San Fernando Valley, Ventura County, Inland Empire, Orange County, San Diego County & a "National Edition" that was distributed to Washington, D.C., and the San Francisco Bay Area. Overall, there were 14 editions succeeded by Our Times, a group of community supplements included in editions of the regular Los Angeles Metro newspaper, with the Our Times editions ceasing publication in 2000.

A subsidiary, Times Community Newspapers, publishes the Daily Pilot of Newport Beach and Costa Mesa. From 2011 to 2013, the Times had published the Pasadena Sun. It also had published the Glendale News-Press and Burbank Leader from 1993 to 2020, and the La Cañada Valley Sun from 2005 to 2020.

On April 30, 2020, Charlie Plowman, publisher of Outlook Newspapers, announced he would acquire the Glendale News-Press, Burbank Leader and La Cañada Valley Sun from Times Community Newspapers. Plowman acquired the South Pasadena Review and San Marino Tribune in late January 2020 from the Salter family, who owned and operated these two community weeklies.

== Features ==
One of the Times' features was "Column One", a feature that appeared daily on the front page to the left-hand side. Established in September 1968, it was a place for the weird and the interesting; in the How Far Can a Piano Fly? (a compilation of Column One stories) introduction, Patt Morrison wrote that the column's purpose was to elicit a "Gee, that's interesting, I didn't know that" type of reaction.

The Times also embarked on a number of investigative journalism pieces. A series in December 2004 on the King/Drew Medical Center in Los Angeles led to a Pulitzer Prize and a more thorough coverage of the hospital's troubled history. Lopez wrote a five-part series on the civic and humanitarian disgrace of Los Angeles' Skid Row, which became the focus of a 2009 motion picture, The Soloist. The paper also won 75 awards at the 2020 Society for News Design (SND) awards for work completed in 2019.

From 1967 to 1972, the Times produced a Sunday supplement called West magazine. West was recognized for its art design, which was directed by Mike Salisbury (who later became art director of Rolling Stone magazine). From 2000 to 2012, the Times published the Los Angeles Times Magazine, which started as a weekly and then became a monthly supplement. The magazine focused on stories and photos of people, places, style, and other cultural affairs occurring in Los Angeles and its surrounding cities and communities. In 2014, The California Sunday Magazine was included in the Sunday L.A. Times edition, but stopped publishing in 2020.

In 2024, the Times published an "L.A. Influential" series, featuring the city's most prominent moguls, artists, community leaders, and others. The feature is arranged in six categories, based on industry and other details.

== Promotion ==
=== Festival of Books ===
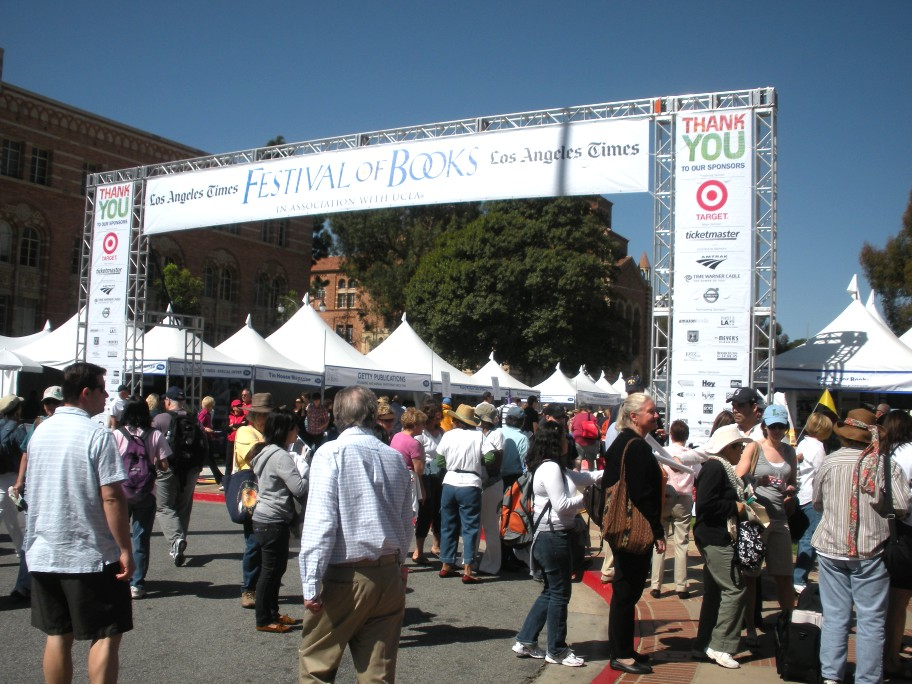
The Los Angeles Times Festival of Books in 2009, held on the UCLA campus

In 1996, the Times started the annual Los Angeles Times Festival of Books, in association with the University of California, Los Angeles. It has panel discussions, exhibits, and stages during two days at the end of April each year. In 2011, the Festival of Books was moved to the University of Southern California.

=== Book prizes ===
Since 1980, the Times has awarded annual book prizes. The categories are now biography, current interest, fiction, first fiction, history, mystery/thriller, poetry, science and technology, and young adult fiction. In addition, the Robert Kirsch Award is presented annually to a living author with a substantial connection to the American West whose contribution to American letters deserves special recognition".

=== Los Angeles Times 500 ===
From 1974 to 1980, the Times sponsored the Los Angeles Times 500, a NASCAR Winston Cup Series stock car race that was held at Ontario Motor Speedway in Ontario, California, the final event was held in 1980 before the track was demolished.

=== Los Angeles Times Grand Prix ===
From 1957 to 1987, the Times sponsored the Los Angeles Times Grand Prix that was held at the Riverside International Raceway in Moreno Valley, California.

== Other media ==
=== Book publishing ===
The Times Mirror Corporation has also owned a number of book publishers over the years, including New American Library, C.V. Mosby Company, Harry N. Abrams, Matthew Bender, and Jeppesen.

In 1960, Times Mirror of Los Angeles bought the book publisher New American Library, known for publishing affordable paperback reprints of classics and other scholarly works. The NAL continued to operate autonomously from New York and within the Mirror Company. In 1983, Odyssey Partners and Ira J. Hechler bought NAL from the Times Mirror Company for over $50 million.

In 1967, Times Mirror acquired C.V. Mosby, a professional publisher and merged it over the years with several other professional publishers including Resource Application, Inc., Year Book Medical Publishers, Wolfe Publishing Ltd., PSG Publishing Company, B.C. Decker, Inc., among others. Eventually in 1998 Mosby was sold to Harcourt Brace & Company to form the Elsevier Health Sciences group.

=== Broadcasting activities ===
Times-Mirror Broadcasting Company
- Formerly: KTTV, Inc. (1947–1963)
- Type: Private
- Industry: Broadcast television Media
- Founded: December 1947
- Defunct: 1993
- Fate: Acquired by Argyle Television (sold to New World Communications in 1994)
- Headquarters: Los Angeles, California, United States
- Area served: United States
- Products: Broadcast and cable television
- Parent: The Times-Mirror Company (1947–1963, 1970–1993); Silent (1963–1970)

The Times-Mirror Company was a founding owner of television station KTTV in Los Angeles, which opened in January 1949. It became that station's sole owner in 1951, after re-acquiring the minority shares it had sold to CBS in 1948. Times-Mirror also purchased a former motion picture studio, Nassour Studios, in Hollywood in 1950, which was then used to consolidate KTTV's operations. Later to be known as Metromedia Square, the studio was sold along with KTTV to Metromedia in 1963.

After a seven-year hiatus from the medium, the firm reactivated Times-Mirror Broadcasting Company with its 1970 purchase of the Dallas Times Herald and its radio and television stations, KRLD-AM-FM-TV in Dallas. The Federal Communications Commission granted an exemption of its cross-ownership policy and allowed Times-Mirror to retain the newspaper and the television outlet, which was renamed KDFW-TV.

Times-Mirror Broadcasting later acquired KTBC-TV in Austin, Texas in 1973; and in 1980 purchased a group of stations owned by Newhouse Newspapers: WAPI-TV (now WVTM-TV) in Birmingham, Alabama; KTVI in St. Louis; WSYR-TV (now WSTM-TV) in Syracuse, New York and its satellite station WSYE-TV (now WETM-TV) in Elmira, New York; and WTPA-TV (now WHTM-TV) in Harrisburg, Pennsylvania. The company also entered the field of cable television, servicing the Phoenix and San Diego areas, amongst others. They were originally titled Times-Mirror Cable, and were later renamed to Dimension Cable Television. Similarly, they also attempted to enter the pay-TV market, with the Spotlight movie network; it was not successful and was quickly shut down. The cable systems were sold in the mid-1990s to Cox Communications.

Times-Mirror also pared its station group down, selling off the Syracuse, Elmira and Harrisburg properties in 1986. The remaining four outlets were packaged to a new upstart holding company, Argyle Television, in 1993. These stations were acquired by New World Communications shortly thereafter and became key components in a sweeping shift of network-station affiliations which occurred between 1994 and 1995.

==== Stations ====
City of license / market	Station	Channel TV / (RF)	Years owned	Current ownership status
Birmingham	WVTM-TV	13 (13)	1980–1993	NBC affiliate owned by Hearst Television
Los Angeles	KTTV ^{1}	11 (11)	1949–1963	Fox owned-and-operated (O&O)
St. Louis	KTVI	2 (43)	1980–1993	Fox affiliate owned by Nexstar Media Group
Elmira, New York	WETM-TV	18 (18)	1980–1986	NBC affiliate owned by Nexstar Media Group
Syracuse, New York	WSTM-TV	3 (24)	1980–1986	NBC affiliate owned by Sinclair Broadcast Group
Harrisburg - Lancaster - Lebanon - York	WHTM-TV	27 (10)	1980–1986	ABC affiliate owned by Nexstar Media Group
Austin, Texas	KTBC	7 (7)	1973–1993	Fox owned-and-operated (O&O)
Dallas - Fort Worth	KDFW ^{2}	4 (35)	1970–1993	Fox owned-and-operated (O&O)

Notes:

- ^{1} Co-owned with CBS until 1951 in a joint venture (51 percent owned by Times-Mirror, 49 percent owned by CBS);
- ^{2} Purchased along with KRLD-AM-FM as part of Times-Mirror's acquisition of the Dallas Times Herald. Times-Mirror sold the radio stations to comply with FCC cross-ownership restrictions.

== Employees ==
=== Unionization ===
On January 19, 2018, employees of the news department voted 248–44 in a National Labor Relations Board election to be represented by the NewsGuild-CWA. The vote came despite aggressive opposition from the paper's management team, reversing more than a century of anti-union sentiment at one of the largest newspapers in the country.

=== Writers and editors ===
- Lorraine Ali, news and culture critic
- Dean Baquet, editor 2000–2007
- Martin Baron, assistant managing editor 1979–1996
- James Bassett, reporter, editor 1934–1971
- Skip Bayless, sportswriter 1976–1978
- Barry Bearak, reporter 1982–1997
- Jim Bellows (1922–2005), editor 1967–1974
- Sheila Benson, film critic 1981–1991
- Martin Bernheimer, music critic, 1982 Pulitzer Prize for Criticism
- Bettina Boxall, reporter, 2009 Pulitzer Prize
- Jeff Brazil, reporter 1993–2000
- Harry Carr (1877–1936), reporter, columnist, editor
- John Carroll, editor 2000–2005
- Julie Cart, reporter, 2009 Pulitzer Prize
- Charles Champlin (1926–2014), film critic 1965–1980
- Sewell Chan, editor of the editorial page
- Justin Chang, film critic 2016–2024
- Michael Cieply, entertainment writer
- Shelby Coffey III, editor 1989–1997
- K. C. Cole, science writer
- Michael Connelly, crime reporter, novelist
- Thomas Curwen, reporter
- Borzou Daragahi, Beirut bureau chief
- Manohla Dargis, film critic
- Meghan Daum, columnist
- Anthony Day (1933–2007), op-ed writer, editor 1969–89
- Frank del Olmo (1948–2004), reporter, editor 1970–2004
- Al Delugach (1925–2015), reporter 1970–1989
- Barbara Demick, Beijing bureau chief, author
- Robert J. Donovan (1912–2003), Washington bureau chief
- Mike Downey, columnist 1985–2001
- Bob Drogin, national political reporter
- Roscoe Drummond (1902–1983), syndicated columnist
- E. V. Durling (1893–1957), columnist 1936–1939
- Bill Dwyre, sports editor and columnist 1981–2015
- Braven Dyer, sports reporter, sports editor 1925–1965
- Louis Dyer, reporter, editor LA Mirror, Home Magazine 1934–1955
- William J. Eaton (1930–2005), correspondent 1984–1994
- Richard Eder (1932–2014), book critic, 1987 Pulitzer Prize for Criticism
- Gordon Edes, sportswriter 1980–1989
- Helene Elliott, sports columnist
- Leonard Feather (1914–1994), jazz critic
- Dexter Filkins, foreign correspondent 1996–1999
- Frank Finch, sportswriter 1944–1976
- Nikki Finke, entertainment reporter
- Thomas Francis Ford (1873–1958), U.S. Congress member, literary and rotogravure editor, City Council member
- Douglas Frantz, managing editor 2005–2007
- Jeffrey Gettleman, Atlanta bureau chief 1999–2002
- Jonathan Gold, food writer, 2007 Pulitzer Prize
- Patrick Goldstein, film columnist 2000–2012
- Carl Greenberg (1908–1984), political writer
- Jean Guerrero, opinion columnist
- Joyce Haber, gossip columnist 1966–1975
- Bill Henry (1890–1970), columnist 1939–1970
- Robert Hilburn, music editor and pop music critic 1970–2005
- Shani Olisa Hilton, deputy managing editor
- Michael Hiltzik, investigative reporter, 1999 Pulitzer Prize for Beat Reporting
- Hedda Hopper (1885–1966), Hollywood columnist 1938–1966
- L. D. Hotchkiss (1893–1964), editor 1922–1958
- Pete Johnson, rock critic of the 1960s
- David Cay Johnston, reporter 1976–1988
- Jonathan Kaiman, Asia correspondent 2015–2016
- K. Connie Kang (1942–2019) first female Korean American journalist
- Philip P. Kerby, 1976 Pulitzer Prize for Criticism
- Ann Killion, sportswriter 1987–1988
- Grace Kingsley (1874–1962), film columnist 1914–1933
- Michael Kinsley, op-ed page editor 2004–2005
- Christopher Knight, art critic, 2020 Pulitzer Prize for Criticism
- William Knoedelseder, business writer
- Howard Lachtman, literary critic
- David Lamb (1940–2016), correspondent 1970–2004
- David Laventhol (1933–2015), publisher 1989–1994
- David Lazarus, business columnist
- Rick Loomis, photojournalist, 2007 Pulitzer Prize for Explanatory Reporting
- Stuart Loory (1937–2015), White House correspondent 1967–1971
- Steve Lopez, columnist
- Charles Fletcher Lummis (1859–1928), city editor 1884–1888
- Davan Maharaj (born c.1958), (1989–2016) former managing editor 2007–2011, editor-in-chief and publisher, from 2011 to 2016
- Al Martinez (1929–2015), columnist 1984–2009
- Andres Martinez, op-ed page editor 2004–2007
- Dennis McDougal, reporter 1982–1992
- Usha Lee McFarling, reporter, 2007 Pulitzer Prize for Explanatory Reporting
- Kristine McKenna, music journalist 1977–1998
- Mary McNamara, TV critic, 2015 Pulitzer Prize for Criticism
- Doyle McManus, Washington bureau chief
- Charles McNulty, theater critic
- Alan Miller, 2003 Pulitzer Prize for National Reporting
- T. Christian Miller, investigative journalist 1999–2008
- Kay Mills, editorial writer 1978–1991
- Carolina Miranda, arts and culture critic 2014–present
- J.R. Moehringer, feature writing, 2000 Pulitzer Prize for Feature Writing
- Patt Morrison, columnist
- Suzanne Muchnic, art critic 1978–2009
- Kim Murphy, assistant managing editor for foreign and national news, 2005 Pulitzer Prize
- Jim Murray (1919–1998), sports columnist, 1990 Pulitzer Prize for Commentary
- Sonia Nazario, feature writing, 2003 Pulitzer Prize
- Dan Neil, columnist, 2004 Pulitzer Prize for Criticism
- Chuck Neubauer, investigative journalist
- Ross Newhan, baseball writer 1967–2004
- Jack Nelson (1929–2009), political reporter, 1960 Pulitzer Prize for Local Reporting
- Amy Nicholson, film critic 2024–present
- Anne-Marie O'Connor, reporter
- Nicolai Ouroussoff, architectural critic
- Scot J. Paltrow, financial journalist 1988–1997
- Olive Percival, columnist
- Bill Plaschke, sports columnist
- Michael Parks, foreign correspondent, editor, 1987 Pulitzer Prize for International Reporting
- Russ Parsons, food writer
- Mike Penner (1957–2009) (Christine Daniels), sportswriter
- Chuck Philips, investigative reporter, 1999 Pulitzer Prize for Beat Reporting
- Michael Phillips, film critic
- Bob Pool, reporter
- Ann Powers, music critic
- Charles T. Powers, foreign correspondent, later novelist
- Paul Pringle, investigative journalist 2001–2026
- George Ramos (1947–2011), reporter 1978–2003
- Richard Read, reporter, 1999 Pulitzer Prize 2001 Pulitzer Prize
- Ruth Reichl, restaurant and food writer 1984–1993
- Rick Reilly, sportswriter 1983–1985
- Lisa Richardson, editorial writer 1992–2022
- James Risen, investigative journalist 1984–1998
- Howard Rosenberg, TV critic, 1985 Pulitzer Prize for Criticism
- Tim Rutten, columnist 1971–2011
- Harriet Ryan, Pulitzer Prize-winning investigative reporter
- Ruth Ryon (1944–2014), real estate writer 1977–2008
- Morrie Ryskind, feature writer 1960–1971
- Kevin Sack, Pulitzer Prize for National Reporting in 2003
- Ruben Salazar (1928–1970), reporter, correspondent 1959–70
- Robert Scheer, national correspondent 1976–1993
- Philip K. Scheuer (1902–1985), motion picture editor and film critic 1927–1967
- David Shaw (1943–2005), 1991 Pulitzer Prize for Criticism
- Gaylord Shaw, reporter, 1978 Pulitzer Prize
- Gene Sherman (1915–1969), reporter, 1960 Pulitzer Prize
- Lee Shippey (1884–1969), columnist 1927–1949
- Barry Siegel, feature writing, 2002 Pulitzer Prize
- T. J. Simers, sports columnist 1990–2013
- Bob Sipchen, editorial writing, 2002 Pulitzer Prize
- Cecil Smith (1917–2009), features writer and reporter 1947–1958; television critic and entertainment editor 1958–1964; drama critic 1964–1969; television critic and columnist 1969–1982
- Jack Smith (1916–1996), columnist 1953–1996
- Frank Sotomayor, reporter, editor
- Bill Stall (1937–2008), editorial writing, 2004 Pulitzer Prize
- Joel Stein, columnist
- Jill Stewart, reporter 1984–1991
- Rone Tempest, investigative reporter 1976–2007
- Kevin Thomas, film critic 1962–2005
- William F. Thomas (1924–2014), editor 1971–1989
- Hector Tobar, columnist, book critic
- William Tuohy (1926–2009), foreign correspondent, 1969 Pulitzer Prize for International Reporting
- Kenneth Turan, film critic
- Julia Turner, deputy managing editor
- Peter Wallsten, national political reporter
- Matt Weinstock (1903–1970), columnist
- Kenneth R. Weiss, 2007 Pulitzer Prize for Explanatory Reporting
- Nick Williams (1906–1992), editor 1958–1971
- David Willman, 2001 Pulitzer Prize for Investigative Reporting
- Michael Wines, correspondent 1984–1988
- Jules Witcover, Washington correspondent 1970–1972
- Gene Wojciechowski, sportswriter 1986–1996
- Willard Huntington Wright (1888–1939), literary editor
- Jeanne Voltz, food editor
- Jen Yamato, film reporter 2017–2024
- Kimi Yoshino, managing editor

=== Cartoonists ===
- Paul Francis Conrad (1924–2010), Pulitzer Prize in 1964, 1971, and 1984
- Ted Rall
- David Horsey, Pulitzer Prize in 1999 and 2003
- Frank Interlandi (1924–2010)
- Michael Patrick Ramirez, Pulitzer Prize in 1994 and 2008
- Bruce Russell (1903–1963), Pulitzer Prize in 1946

=== Photographers ===
- Don Bartletti, Pulitzer Prize in 2003
- Carolyn Cole, Pulitzer Prize in 2004
- Rick Corrales (1957–2005), photographer 1981–1995
- Mary Nogueras Frampton (1930–2006), one of the paper's first female photographers
- Jose Galvez, photographer 1980–1992
- John L. Gaunt Jr. (1924–2007), Pulitzer Prize in 1955
- Rick Loomis, photojournalist, 2007 Pulitzer Prize
- Anacleto Rapping, multiple Pulitzer Prizes
- George Rose, photojournalist 1977–1983
- George Strock, photojournalist of the 1930s
- Annie Wells, photojournalist 1997–2008
- Clarence Williams, Pulitzer Prize in 1998
