= George Rose (photographer) =

American photographer and writer (born 1952)

George Rose (born December 23, 1952) is an American photographer and writer whose career has included work for the National Football League, Rolling Stone, Time, Life, Newsweek, Sports Illustrated, USA Today and the Los Angeles Times. He spent 20 years in the California wine industry, holding prominent public relations positions while amassing a significant body of award-winning food and wine photography.

== Early career ==
A graduate of Ganesha High School in Pomona, California, George Rose's newspaper and photographic career began in the early 1970s when he worked as a copy messenger for the Pomona Progress-Bulletin. In 1974, Rose was hired as a staff photographer at the nearby Claremont Courier. Following a 1977 staff photographer stint at the Louisville Courier-Journal, Rose moved back to Southern California to become a staff photographer for the Los Angeles Times.

== Los Angeles Times ==
It was at the Times that Rose honed his photo skills and developed a style covering a variety of national and worldwide news events, major sports and fashion, with a special emphasis on Hollywood and popular culture. Rose was twice nominated for a Pulitzer Prize while working at the Los Angeles Times, first for his 1979 photographic coverage of the Malibu fires, and also in 1980 for his coverage of the presidential election.

== National Football League ==
Beginning in 1983, Rose spent 15 years as a photographer for the National Football League, covering regular season, playoff and Super Bowl games. Virtually every weekend was spent shooting at least one Sunday NFL game and, on many occasions, Monday Night Football. Special emphasis was on photographing the Joe Montana and Steve Young eras at the San Francisco 49ers, as well as the Oakland and Los Angeles versions of the Raiders. Rose was member of the elite official NFL Super Bowl photo team, providing game coverage for 13 of his 15 years.

== Freelance work ==
His freelance photography from 1985 to 1991 was featured in Rolling Stone, Time, Life, Newsweek, Sports Illustrated, USA Today and the Los Angeles Times. Rose is a recipient of a World Press Award for his aerial photograph of the 1987 Whittier Narrows earthquake.

Rose's career included other interests as well. From 1983 to 1985, he co-owned and published the Mendocino Grapevine, a general interest weekly newspaper in Mendocino County, California.

== Wine industry ==
It was during his time in Mendocino County that Rose met members of the Fetzer family, owners of Fetzer Vineyards. In 1991, Rose accepted a public relations position at Fetzer Vineyards in Hopland, California, and spent the next 18 years in the California wine industry.

In 1998, he became public relations director for Allied Domecq Wines, USA, parent company of Sonoma County's well-known Clos du Bois winery. The Allied Domecq Wines portfolio also included Cockburn's Port, and French Champagne houses Mumm and Perrier-Joüet.

In 2003, he became Vice President of public relations at Kendall-Jackson, America's top premium wine producer. After nearly six years at the Kendall-Jackson helm, Rose left to write, work on several book projects, and consult with smaller wineries on sensible trade and media public relations strategies.

In 2008 after a brief break from the wine business, Rose signed on to write a regular column for Dan Berger's Vintage Experiences, a weekly wine trade and consumer newsletter. Rose's occasional essays on wine and other issues of the day have appeared in the Santa Rosa Press Democrat, the Ukiah Daily Journal and the San Francisco Chronicle.

From 2009 to 2014, Rose was the Director of Communications for Healdsburg-based J Vineyard & Winery, a Sonoma County producer of sparkling and varietal wines.

== Photographic archive ==
During his years in the wine industry, Rose expanded his photographic portfolio to include Northern California wine regions as well as major wine & food events. Today, his portfolio is one of the most diverse in the business, and includes 1970s rock and roll legends, 1980s celebrities, scenic California landscapes, NFL action, global travel, as well as food and wine photography. Rose is currently an editorial contributing photographer at Getty Images.

== Exhibits and book publications ==
Rose's photography has been featured in several exhibits at Mumm Napa's Fine Art Photography Gallery in Rutherford, California, as well as exhibits at the Sonoma County Museum, Mendocino County Museum, The New School of Design in New York, and the Los Angeles Museum of Rock and Roll. In 2018, Rose became an artist-member at Gallery Los Olivos, located in Los Olivos, CA.

In addition to his wine industry executive responsibilities, Rose has focused on producing several photo books. The Art of Terroir, published by Chronicle Books in 2007, captures the seasonal changes in California wine country. Hollywood, Beverly Hills & Other Perversities, a snapshot of 1970s pop culture published in 2008 by Ten Speed Press, remains a cult classic among Hollywood celebrity aficionados. In 2017, he published VINEYARD: Sonoma County, a coffee table photographic book on that wine region's sustainable estate vineyards.

Rose is the 2017 winner of the Louis Roederer International Wine Writer award for "Best Artistry."

He currently resides in Santa Barbara County's Santa Ynez Valley.
