= George M. Rose =

American politician from North Carolina

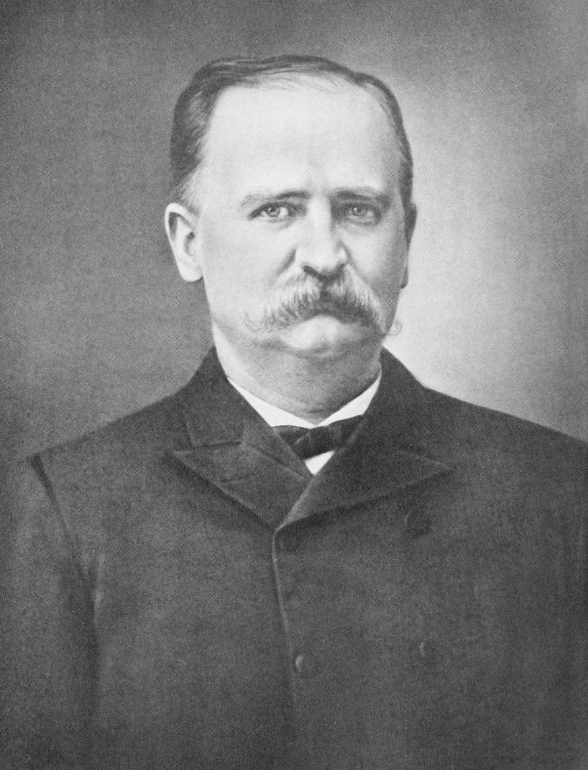
- Born: June 5, 1846; Fayetteville, North Carolina
- Died: June 15, 1924 (aged 78); Fayetteville, North Carolina
- Occupations: Lawyer, politician
- Political party: Democratic

Signature
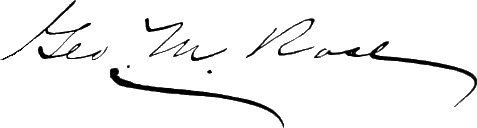

George M. Rose (1846–1924) was Speaker of the North Carolina House of Representatives. He was a Democrat.

== Biography ==
George M. Rose was born in Fayetteville, North Carolina on June 5, 1846. He studied at Donaldson Academy, Davidson College, and the Virginia Military Institute.

He was among the VMI cadets who fought at the Battle of New Market. He later served in the Confederate States Army as adjutant of the 66th North Carolina Regiment.

After the war, he studied at the University of North Carolina, graduating with a law degree in 1867.

He won a house seat at the end of the Reconstruction era in 1876. In 1881 he represented Cumberland County, North Carolina in the House. He served with several African Americans.

Rose died at his home in Fayetteville on June 15, 1924.
