= David Willman =

American journalist

- Born: October 18, 1956 (age 69); Pasadena, California, U.S.
- Education: Pasadena City College; San Jose State University (B.A.)
- Occupation: Investigative journalist

David Willman (born October 18, 1956) is an American investigative journalist. He was awarded the Pulitzer Prize for Investigative Reporting in 2001 for his report on seven unsafe prescription drugs approved by the Food and Drug Administration.

== Biography ==
=== Early life and education ===
Willman was born in California and graduated from San Jose State University with a B.A. in Journalism in 1978 after studying Journalism at Pasadena City College.

=== Career ===
His work has prompted major public reforms, including a ban in 2005 of drug company payments to government scientists at the U.S. National Institutes of Health. Willman's investigative reports in the Los Angeles Times also led to the March 2000 safety withdrawal of Rezulin, a Type 2 Diabetes drug that grossed more than $2 billion in sales.

Earlier in his career, Willman covered local, state and national politics, including presidential campaigns in 1980, 1984 and 1988.

Willman has worked from Washington D.C., and throughout California. His investigative reports in the 1990s exposed defective construction within tunnels of the Los Angeles subway, along with defective welds at the Los Angeles Memorial Coliseum, prompting structural overhauls. Within the subway, sections of the tunnel walls had been built with concrete thinner than the required minimum of 12 inches. At the Coliseum, the faulty welds had helped support the facility's cantilevered press box, suspended over hundreds of spectator seats. All corrective subway repairs were ultimately made at the expense of the contractors responsible for the defective work, and leaders of both projects said the structures were safe. He currently resides in Bethesda, Maryland.

Willman's 2011 book The Mirage Man: Bruce Ivins, the Anthrax Attacks, and America's Rush to War was published by Bantam Books and focuses on the 2001 anthrax letter attacks in the U.S. and the subsequent media coverage and FBI investigation. In 2018, 20th Century Fox and film producer Steven Zaillian announced that they had bought the feature rights to The Mirage Man and were developing a movie based on it.

Willman did a feature investigation piece for the British Medical Journal in 2023 entitled "The US quietly terminates a controversial $125m wildlife virus hunting programme amid safety fears".

== Awards ==
In awarding Willman the 2001 Pulitzer Prize for Investigative Reporting, the organization cited "his pioneering expose of seven unsafe prescription drugs that had been approved by the Food and Drug Administration, and an analysis of the policy reforms that had reduced the agency’s effectiveness."

In 2004, Willman won the Worth Bingham Prize, awarded for "investigative reporting of stories of national significance where the public interest is ill-served." Willman had brought to light drug company payments—including consulting fees and awards of stock and stock options—to senior scientists at the National Institutes of Health. When he announced a ban of such future payments, NIH Director Elias A. Zerhouni, M.D., credited Willman's reports in the Los Angeles Times.

Other honors he has won include the George Polk Award (1997) and the medal award of Investigative Reporters and Editors (1997, 1999). Willman was the first recipient of Harvard University's David Nyhan Prize for Political Journalism (2005). His reporting on the investigation of the anthrax mailings won the Scripps Howard Foundation's Raymond Clapper award as the year's best Washington-based coverage (2009).
