= Timothy Ryan (newspaper publisher) =

American journalist

Timothy E. Ryan
- Born: 20th century
- Education: University of Notre Dame; Kellogg School of Management at Northwestern University
- Occupation: Newspaper publisher

Timothy E. Ryan (born 20th century) is an American newspaper publisher and businessman. In 2015, Ryan was named publisher and chief executive officer of the Los Angeles Times and The San Diego Union-Tribune. Prior to his position with The Los Angeles Times, beginning in 2007, he served as publisher and chief executive officer of The Baltimore Sun.

== Early life and education ==
Ryan earned a bachelor's degree in political science from the University of Notre Dame in 1981 and an MBA from Northwestern University's Kellogg School of Management in 1991.

== Career ==
Ryan began his career at the Chicago Tribune and was later vice president of circulation at The Philadelphia Inquirer from 1993 to 2000. He served as vice president of circulation and operations at The Baltimore Sun from 2000 to 2005. He worked as vice president of circulation and consumer marketing at the Chicago Tribune from 2005 to 2007.

Ryan served as publisher and chief executive officer of The Baltimore Sun from 2007 to 2015. At the time, The Baltimore Sun described him as "...very engaged in the news. He's a news junkie... [In his previous role as circulation director] he obviously wanted to sell newspapers, but it was way beyond that. It seemed to be a passion of his." In 2010, he was named publisher and chief executive officer of The Morning Call Media Group (MCMG) in the Lehigh Valley region of eastern Pennsylvania.

In 2015, Ryan was named publisher of the Los Angeles Times and The San Diego Union-Tribune. In 2016, he was promoted to president of publishing, where he was responsible for all Tribune Publishing's newspapers and related websites including the Los Angeles Times, The San Diego Union-Tribune, The Chicago Tribune, The Baltimore Sun, The Morning Call, and the Orlando Sentinel. He departed Tribune Publishing in 2017.
