= Hank Laventhol =

American painter (1927–2001)

- Born: Henry Lee Laventhol; December 21, 1927; Philadelphia, Pennsylvania, U.S.
- Died: February 21, 2001 (aged 73); Somers, New York, U.S.
- Known for: Painting, graphics, sculpture
- Movement: Surrealism

Hank Laventhol (December 21, 1927 – February 21, 2001) was an American painter and master print maker who made his career in Europe. Born in Philadelphia, Pennsylvania, Laventhol graduated Yale University with a BA in Fine Arts, then did post graduate studies at Columbia University and went into business in New York City. At the age of 32, he left for Europe to pursue additional studies in art. He attended the Academy of Fine Arts in Florence, Italy, and eventually spent 10 years in Europe, making his home in Mallorca, Spain. He had four solo shows in London and one-man-exhibitions in Paris, Amsterdam, Copenhagen, Düsseldorf, Brussels, Florence, Zürich, Lausanne and Barcelona. In the United States his work was seen at five solo shows at the Bodley Gallery in New York City. He also showed in other major US cities.

Laventhol’s work is in corporate and private collections, museums and libraries, including The National Gallery of Art, Washington, D.C., Yale University Art Gallery, The Nasher Museum of Art at the Art Museum of Duke University, Durham, North Carolina, The Print Collection of The New York Public Library, The Free Library of Philadelphia, and La Bibliothèque nationale de France in Paris. Laventhol has been listed in Benezit, the definitive Directory of Painters and Print Makers.

Besides painting and sculpting in multiple media, Laventhol published editions of etchings and color aquatints, a demanding and precise process that provided him with a variety of color and texture, unrivaled by any other etching technique. He owned two etching presses and pulled his own prints. Publishers include Associated American Artists, New York Graphic Society, Original Print Collectors Group Ltd., Pierre Chave, France and George Visat, Paris, who also published graphic editions of, among others, René Magritte, Man Ray, Roberto Matta.

Critics called Laventhol a surrealist. The artist, however, preferred to think of his work as dealing with fantasy realism.
