= George Rose (Navy member) =

United States Navy Medal of Honor recipient

George Harry Rose
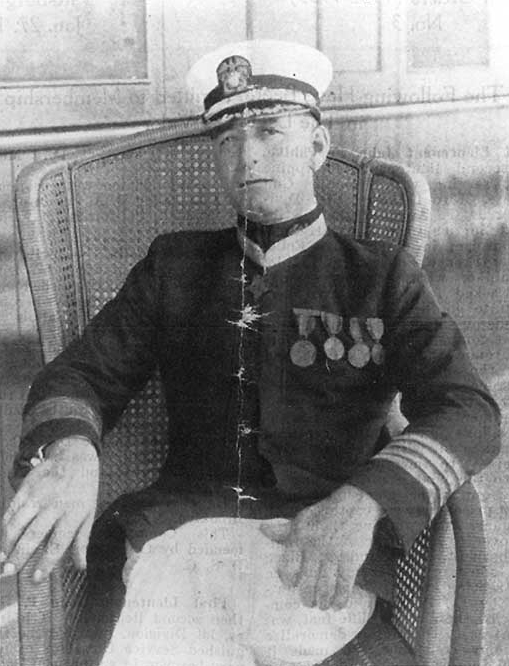
- Lieutenant Commander George Rose
- Born: February 28, 1880; Stamford, Connecticut, US
- Died: December 7, 1932 (aged 52); Newark, New Jersey, US
- Burial place: Arlington National Cemetery
- Military career
- Allegiance: United States
- Branch: United States Navy
- Rank: Lieutenant Commander
- Unit: USS Newark (C-1)
- Conflicts: China Relief Expedition; World War I
- Awards: Medal of Honor

George Harry Rose (February 28, 1880 – December 7, 1932) was a member of the United States Navy and a recipient of the United States military's highest decoration—the Medal of Honor—for his actions during the China Relief Expedition.

== Biography ==
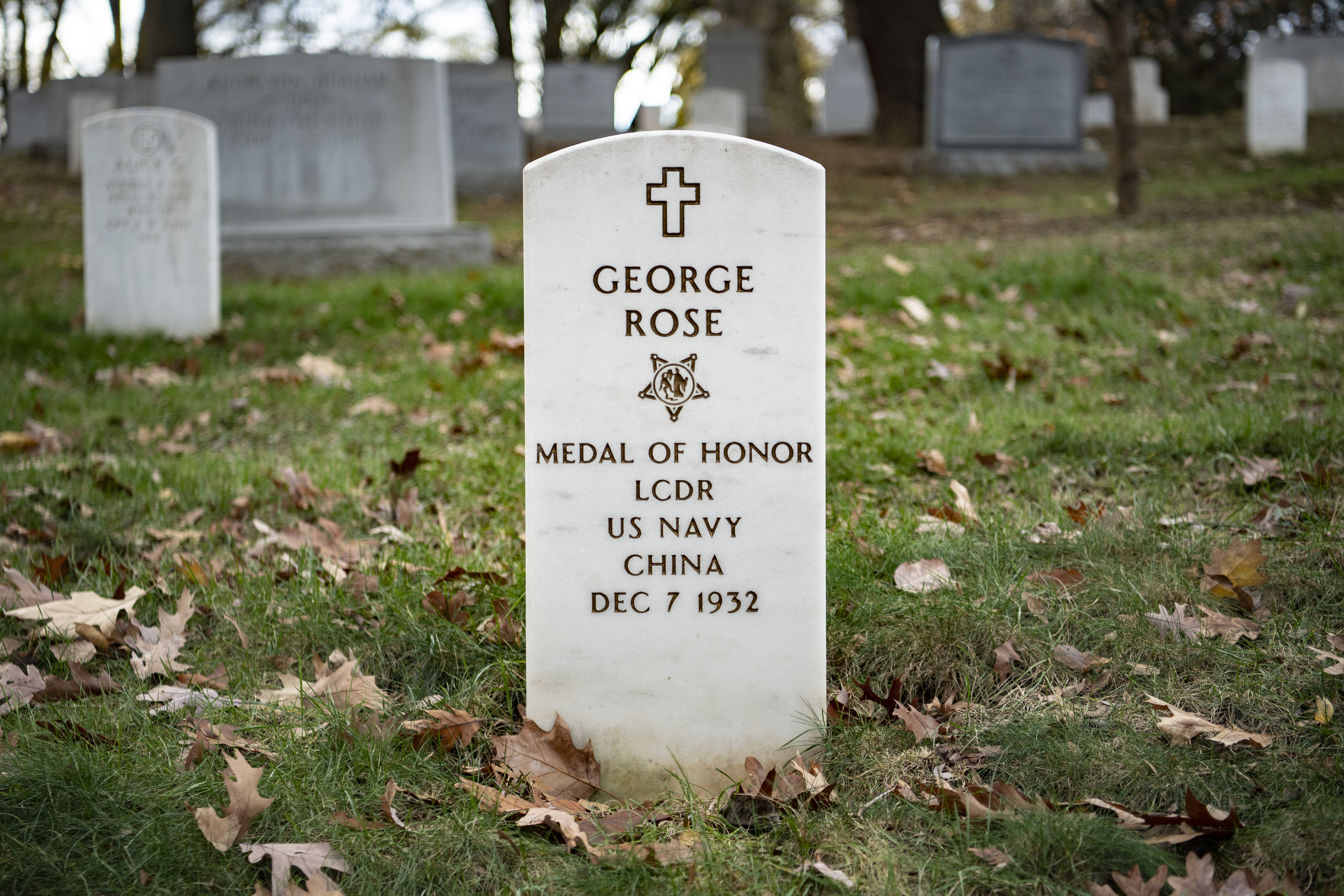
Grave at Arlington National Cemetery

Rose enlisted in the Navy from his birth state of Connecticut and served on the cruiser USS Newark (C-1) as a seaman.

During the China Relief Expedition of 1900, Newark, serving as flagship for the Assistant Commander of the Asiatic Station, was brought to the Beijing (Peking) area to protect Americans who were under threat from the Boxer Rebellion. Rose voluntarily took part in land operations there in May and June 1900, distinguishing himself on several occasions, among them carrying dispatches on June 10, helping to fight off an attack on his unit's baggage train on the 13th, engaging in combat from June 20, to June 22, and obtaining medical supplies from an enemy-held village. For his "meritorious conduct" on 13, 20, 21 and June 22, he was awarded the Medal of Honor by General Order 55, dated July 19, 1901.

Rose received a commission as an ensign in the Naval Reserve on March 22, 1917. He served in the Third Naval District (New York City region) during World War I and was promoted to Lieutenant (junior grade) on September 21, 1918. On July 15, 1929, he became a Lieutenant Commander in the Merchant Marine Naval Reserve.

Rose died at age 52 and is buried at Arlington National Cemetery, Arlington County, Virginia.

== Medal of Honor citation ==
Seaman Rose's official Medal of Honor citation reads:

In the presence of the enemy during the battles at Peking, China, 13, 20, 21 and 22 June 1900. Throughout this period, Rose distinguished himself by meritorious conduct. While stationed as a crewmember of the U.S.S. Newark, he was part of its landing force that went ashore off Taku, China. on 31 May 1900, he was in a party of 6 under John McCloy (MH) which took ammunition from the Newark to Tientsin. On 10 June 1900, he was one of a party that carried dispatches from LaFa to Yongstsum at night. On the 13th he was one of a few who fought off a large force of the enemy saving the Main baggage train from destruction. On the 20th and 21st he was engaged in heavy fighting against the Imperial Army being always in the first rank. On the 22d he showed gallantry in the capture of the Siku Arsenal. He volunteered to go to the nearby village which was occupied by the enemy to secure medical supplies urgently required. The party brought back the supplies carried by newly taken prisoners.

== See also ==
- List of Medal of Honor recipients
