= George Rose (businessman) =

British businessman

George Rose is a British businessman.

He joined British Aerospace in 1992 and continues to serve on the board of its successor, BAE Systems, as finance director. He is a Non Executive Director of National Grid Transco plc and was on the board of SAAB AB.

Rose was ranked 67th in The Times Power 100 list, published by The Times in November 2006.

He has also served on the boards of Leyland DAF UK, DAF NV, Rover Group and Orange plc.
