= T.J. Caystile =

American printer

T.J. J. Caystile
- Born: Thomas J. Caystile c. 1848
- Died: May 16, 1884 (aged 35–36)
- Occupations: Publisher, printer, newspaperman
- Known for: Co-founder of the Los Angeles Times
- Spouse: Helen M. White
- Children: 1

Thomas J. Caystile, better known as T.J. Caystile (c. 1848 – 1884), was an American printer and newspaperman, who, with his partners, Jesse Yarnell and S. J. Mathes, founded the Los Angeles Mirror and later took over the Los Angeles Daily Times, later to be known as the Los Angeles Times.

Caystile was the son of immigrants, Thomas and Esther (Lea) Caystile from the Isle of Man. Caystile's father, led a wagon train across the plains to California, where the family settled in Placerville. On December 19, 1868, Caystile became the owner of the Mountain Democrat in that town, along with George Kles.

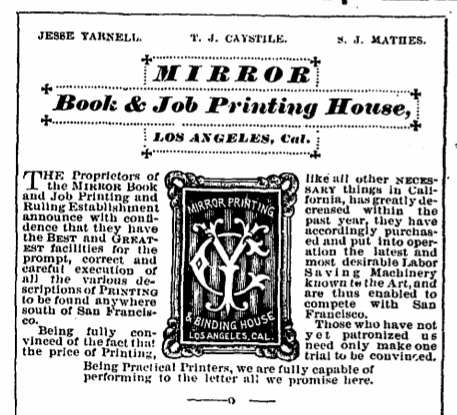
1882 Mirror Printing Company advertisement and logo

He died on May 16, 1884, and was survived by a daughter, Helen Caystile Duncan. He had a sister, Kate, who married George K. Porter, owner of the Porter Ranch in the San Fernando Valley, and another sister, Marian of Riverside, California. His widow, Helen M., was the daughter of Caleb Edwin White, a horticulturist of Pomona, California and Rebecca Holship née Furguson. Seven years after Caystile's death, she married 2 Sep 1890 Reginaldo Francisco del Valle, a Democratic candidate for lieutenant-governor of California. Their daughter Lucretia Louise del Valle married Henry Francis Grady, Ambassador to Greece, India, and Iran.

== See also ==
- List of Los Angeles Times publishers
