= Davan Maharaj =

Journalist

- Born: Trinidad and Tobago
- Education: University of Tennessee, Yale University
- Occupation: Journalist
- Employer: Los Angeles Times (former)
- Awards: Ernie Pyle Award for Human Interest Writing (2005)

Davan Maharaj (born in Trinidad and Tobago) is a journalist and the former editor-in-chief and publisher of the Los Angeles Times.

== Biography ==
Maharaj was born in Trinidad and Tobago. He worked as a reporter at the Trinidad Express before moving to the United States, where he received a degree in political science from the University of Tennessee, as well as a master's degree in law from Yale University. He started his career at the Los Angeles Times as an intern in 1989, subsequently working as a reporter in Los Angeles, Orange County, and East Africa. He won the 2005 Ernie Pyle Award for Human Interest Writing.

In December 2011, Maharaj was named editor and executive vice president of the Times. In March 2016, he was named editor-in-chief and publisher.

In December 2016, Los Angeles Magazine published an in-depth report that was a disturbing exposure of Maharaj's methods managing the Times.

In August 2017, Jim Kirk and Ross Levinsohn replaced Maharaj as editor and publisher, respectively, of the Times.
