= David Hiller =

American lawyer

David D. Hiller
- Born: June 12, 1953 (age 73)
- Education: Harvard University (JD)
- Occupations: Lawyer; Publisher
- Notable work: Chicago Tribune
- Title: Former president, CEO & board of director of McCormick Foundation

David Dean Hiller (born June 12, 1953) is a lawyer and former media executive for Chicago-based Tribune Company. On May 18, 2009, he was appointed president and CEO of the McCormick Foundation, a leading charitable organization with more than $1 billion in assets. He previously served on the board of directors for the McCormick Foundation and is active in executive and civic organizations in Chicago. He formerly served as publisher, president and CEO of the Los Angeles Times, and before that, as publisher of the Chicago Tribune. From 2006 to 2008, Hiller was at the center of controversy over the editorial control of the Times news division, which resulted in the resignation and firing of lead editors Dean Baquet and James O'Shea. On July 14, 2008, Hiller resigned after 21 months as publisher of the L.A. Times.

Prior to becoming publisher of the Chicago Tribune, Hiller served as SVP of Tribune Publishing, president of Tribune Interactive, and SVP of Development, where he oversaw strategic investments in Internet and new media companies for Tribune Ventures. From 1988 to 1993, he was vice president and general counsel of Tribune Co.

Hiller was a partner at Sidley Austin, a large Chicago law firm, before he joined the Tribune Co. Prior to joining the law firm, he held several positions in Washington, D.C., including law clerk for Supreme Court Justice Potter Stewart. He received his Juris Doctor from Harvard Law School, where he was an editor of the Harvard Law Review, and received his undergraduate degree from Harvard College.

== See also ==
- List of law clerks for the eighth seat of the Supreme Court of the United States

== Sources ==
- "Former Publisher of Chicago Tribune and L.A. Times, named McCormick Foundation CEO," Chicago Tribune, May 18, 2009
- "What's Happening to the News". Frontline. Aired PBS 2006-02-27.
- Katherine Q. Seelye, "Los Angeles Paper Ousts Top Editor,' New York Times, November 8, 2006
- Kevin Roderick, "Hller's Republican Donations," L.A. Observed
- Michael Hiltzik, "Los Angeles Times Publisher David Hiller resigns," Los Angeles Times, July 14, 2008
- McCormick Foundation
