= Jesse Yarnell =

American journalist (1837–1906)

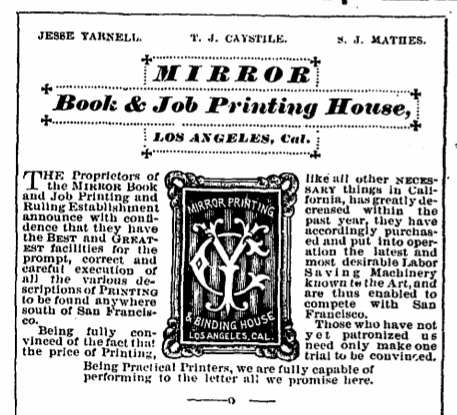
1882 Mirror Printing Company advertisement and logo

Thomas Jesse Yarnell, better known as Jesse Yarnell (1837–1906), was an American newspaperman who established the Los Angeles, California, Weekly Mirror, which took over the Los Angeles Times in 1881 and later merged with it.

== Biography ==
Yarnell was born in Gratiot, Ohio, on June 20, 1837, and learned the printing trade in nearby Zanesville.

He came to California in 1862 and established the Daily News in Placerville. He and Susan Caystile were married there. In 1866 he moved south to Los Angeles, where he founded the Weekly Republican newspaper, which he later sold to a brother-in-law. It later merged with the Evening Express. He next founded the Weekly Mirror in Los Angeles.

Yarnell was a candidate on the Prohibition party ticket for an at-large Congressional seat in the 1882 election, but lost. In 1902, he was nominated by the Prohibitionists for a seat in the California State Assembly but campaigned unsuccessfully as an independent.

He died on January 19, 1906. He was survived by his widow, Susan Caystile Yarnell, their son Ellis, and their three daughters, Jessie, Catherine and Esther Yarnell. He also had a brother, George. Yarnell left an estate of about $50,000, the largest item being a 204-acre ranch in Buena Park, California, valued at $30,000.

== See also ==
- List of Los Angeles Times publishers
