= Budgerigar colour genetics =

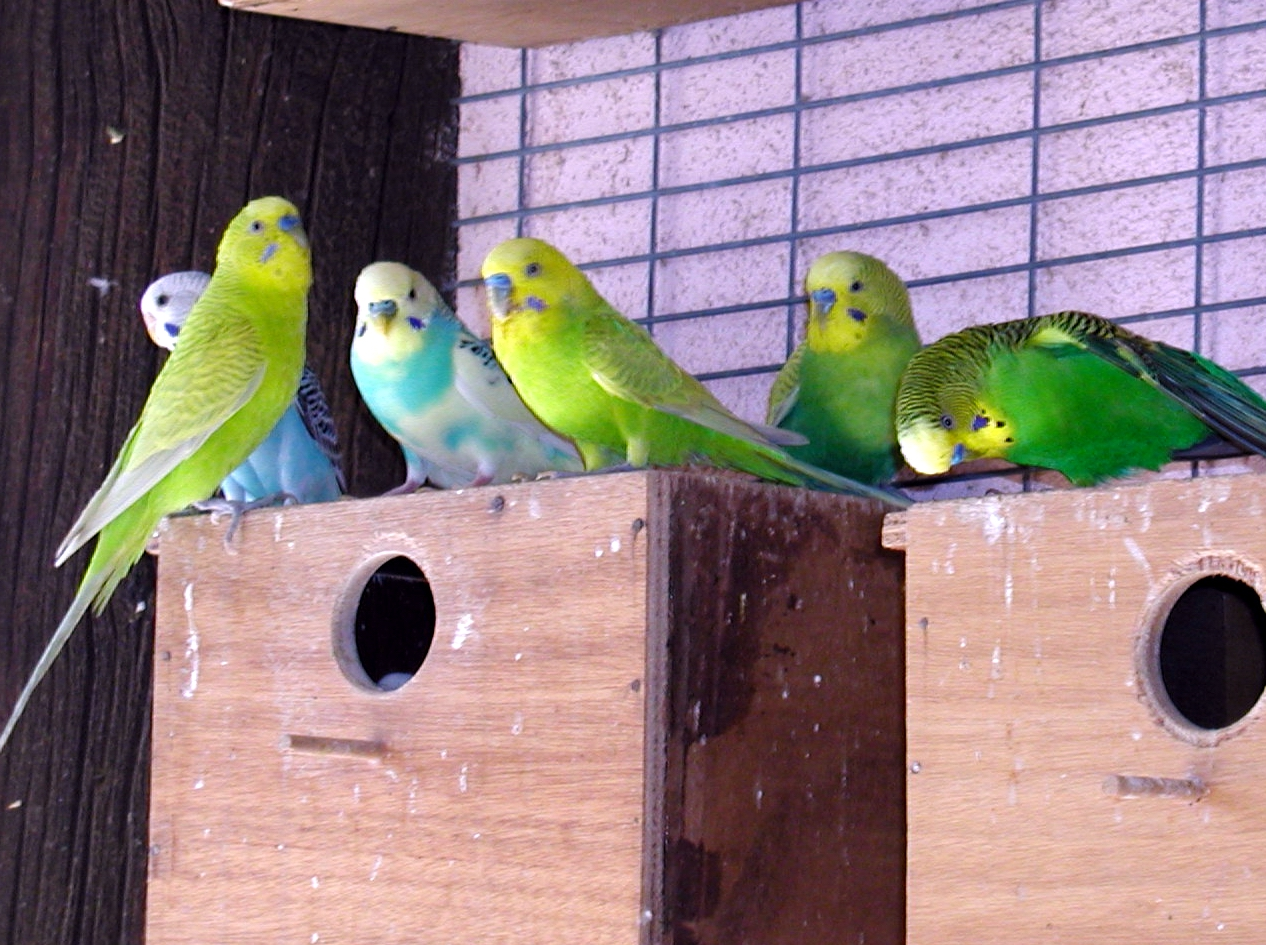
Melopsittacus undulatus at Chai-Negev, Revivim, Israel.

The science of budgerigar colour genetics deals with the heredity of mutations which cause colour variation in the feathers of the species known scientifically as Melopsittacus undulatus. Birds of this species are commonly known by the terms "budgerigar" or "parakeet".

== Background ==
The wildtype (natural-coloured or wild occurring) budgerigar's colour is called Lightgreen. The feathers of most parrot species, including budgerigars, contain both a black type of melanin named eumelanin along with a basic yellow pigment named psittacofulvin (psittacin for short). Some other parrot species produce a third pigment named advanced-psittacin which enables colour & tones ranging from oranges, peaches, and pinks to reds. When these feathers are exposed to a white light source, such as sunlight, only the blue part of the spectrum is reflected by the eumelanin granules. This reflected blue light passes through the yellow pigment layer, resulting in the green colouration known as lightgreen in only the budgerigar and/or green in any other naturally green coloured parrot species.

The many colour variations of budgerigars, such as albino, blue, cinnamon, Clearwinged, the various Fallows, Grey, Greygreen, Greywing, Lutino, Mauve, Olive, Opaline, Spangled, Suffused and Violet are the result of mutations that have occurred within specific genes. There are at least thirty-two known primary mutations established among budgerigars. These can combine to form hundreds of secondary mutations and colour varieties which may or may not be stable.

As is true with all animal species, colour mutations occur in captivity as well as in the wild. This has been demonstrated when captive-bred budgerigars have developed mutations that had only been previously recorded amongst wild populations.

== Classification of mutations ==
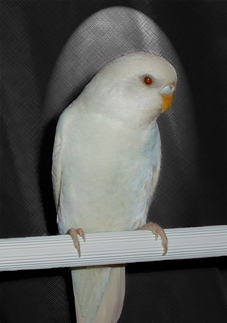
Because of albinism this budgerigar has virtually no eumelanin pigment. This, together with the Blue mutation which removes the yellow pigmentation, produces a nearly pure white colouration along with clear (orange) beak, pink feet/skin, white-tipped clear (pink) toe nails and red eyes.

=== Basic groups ===
Each of the thirty-two primary mutations belong to one of the four basic groups of mutations classified in parrot species genetics:

- Albinism: where eumelanin is either partially or completely reduced in all body tissues and structures.
- Dilution: where eumelanin is partially reduced in only feathering.
- Leucism: where eumelanin is completely reduced from total or localized feathering.
- Melanism: where eumelanin is increased in the feathering.

=== Dominance relationship ===
These mutations are inherited through one of the following dominance relationships.

- autosomal-Co-Dominant (A-Co-D),
- autosomal-Complete-Dominant (A-C-D),
- autosomal-Incomplete-Dominant (A-I-D),
- autosomal-recessive (A-R),
- autosomal-Poly-Genic (A-P-G)
- Sex-Linked-recessive (S-L-R)

=== Table of primary mutations ===
Mutation(s)	Common names & varieties	Type	Wild-type symbol (locus)	Allele symbol	Dominance relationship
Dark	D Green (Dark Green), D_Blue (Cobalt), DD Green (Olive) & DD_Blue (Mauve)	Structural	D^{+}	D	A-I-D
Blue 1	Blue-series	colour	b^{+}	b^{1}	recessive with other b-locus alleles except b^{2}, else A-R
Blue 2	Blue-series	colour	b^{+}	b^{2}	recessive with other b-locus alleles except b^{1}, else A-R
Blue 1-Blue 2	Yellowface I	colour	b^{+}	b^{1} / b^{2}	(Hetero-allelic mutation produced by crossing Blue 1 & Blue 2 varieties)
Yellowface	Yellowface II	colour	b^{+}	b^{yf}	Dominant with other b-locus alleles except gf, else A-R
Goldenface	Goldenface	colour	b^{+}	b^{gf}	Dominant with other b-locus alleles, else A-R
Crest-Factor (C-F)	Circular Crested, Semicircular Crested & Tufted	Structural	Cr^{+}	Cr	A-P-G
Dominant Grey	(Australian) Grey & Greygreen	Structural	G^{+}	G	A-C-D
English Grey	English Grey & Greygreen	Structural	g^{+}	g	A-I-D (rare or extinct)
Anthracite	Anthracite	Structural	An^{+}	An	A-I-D (rare)
Recessive Grey & Greygreen	Australian recessive greygreen & grey	Structural	rg^{+}	rg	A-R (extremely rare or extinct)
Slate	Slate (bluish-gray)	Structural	sl^{+}	sl	S-L-R
Violet	SF Violet (SF Violet Green), SF Violet Blue (Violet Skyblue), DF Violet Green (pure Violet Green) & DF Violet Blue (pure VIOLET), SF Violet D_Blue (show Violet), DF Violet D_Blue (VIOLET Mauve)	Structural	V^{+}	V	A-I-D
Dilute	Suffused Green (Dilute Yellow) and Suffused Blue (Dilute White)	Dilution	dil^{+}	dil^{s}	A-R
Clearwing (CW)	Clearwing Green (Yellowing) & Clearwing Blue (Whitewing)	Dilution	dil^{+}	dil^{cw}	A-Co-D with dil^{gw} allele, A-D over dil^{d} allele, else A-R
Greywing (GW)	Greywing Green & Greywing Blue,	Dilution	dil^{+}	dil^{gw}	A-Co-D with dil^{cw} allele, A-D over dil^{d} allele, else A-R
Greywing-Clearwing	Fullbodied-Greywing Green & Fullbodied-Greywing Blue	Dilution	dil^{+}	dil^{cw} / dil^{gw}	(Hetero-allelic mutation produced by crossing Clearwing & Greywing varieties)
ADMpied a.k.a. Recessivepied	Anti Dimorphic Pied, Danishpied, Harlequin,	Local-Leucism	s^{+}	s	A-R
Piebald Australian Pied	Australian Pied, Banded Pied	Local-Leucism	Pb^{+}	Pb	A-C-D
Piednape	Continental_Dutchpied & Clearflighted_Dutchpied	Local-Leucism	Pi^{+}	Pi	A-C-D
Clear-Pied	Black-Eyed-Clear (a.k.a. Dark-Eyed-Clear)	Total Leucism	Pi^{+} ; s^{+}	Pi / s	A-Co-D Clear Yellow & White morphs produced by combining SF &/or DF Clearflighted_Dutchpied with Homozygous ADMpied a.k.a. Recessivepied
Spangle-Factor (Sp)	SF Spangled (showtype / typical mutation) & DF Spangled (clear white &/or clear yellow pure mutation)	Total Leucism	Sp^{+}	Sp	A-I-D
NSLino	Non-Sex-Linked Ino a.k.a. Recessive Ino	NSL Complete Albinism	a^{+}	a*a	A-R (extremely rare or extinct)
Bronzefallow	German Fallow	NSL Incomplete Albinism	a^{+}	a^{bz}	A-R
Brown &/or Sepia	Brownwinged	NSL Incomplete Albinism	b^{+}	b	Presumed A-Co-D with only a-Locus alleles, else exclusively/inclusively A-R (extremely rare or extinct)
Faded		NSL Incomplete Albinism	fd^{+}	fd	A-R (extremely rare)
Palefallow	Australianfallow. Beigefallow, Palebrownfallow	NSL Incomplete Albinism	pf^{+}	pf	A-R
Dunfallow	English Fallow	NSL Incomplete Albinism	df^{+}	df	A-R
Scottish Fallow (a.k.a. Plumeyed Fallow)	Scottish Fallow	NSL Incomplete Albinism	pl^{+}	pl	A-R
Cinnamon	Cinnamon	SL Incomplete Albinism	cin^{+}	cin	S-L-R
Ino	Albino, Lutino	SL Complete Albinism	ino^{+}	ino	S-L-R
Cinnamon-Ino	Lacewing	SL Incomplete Albinism	cin^{+} ; ino^{+}	cin / ino	S-L-R cross-over (3% frequency) between Cinnamon & Ino Loci
Sex-linked Clearbody	Texas Clearbody	Partial-Albinistic (Par-ino)	ino^{+}	ino^{cl}	SL-Co-D with other ino locus alleles, else S-L-R
Blackfaced (BF)		Melanism	bf^{+}	bf	A-R
Darkwinged (DW)		Modifier	dw^{+}	dw	A-Co-D (only noticeably expressive in combination with dil-Locus alleles and with Greywinged & Suffused)
Dominant Clearbody	Easley Clearbody	Pigment redistributing	Cl^{+}	Cl	A-C-D
Opaline	Opaline	Pigment redistributing	op^{+}	op	S-L-R
Saddlebacked (SB)		Local-Leucism	sb^{+}	sb	A-R (extremely rare or extinct)

== History ==
In the first few decades of the 1900s, especially in-between World War I and II, the keeping and breeding of the budgerigar had become very popular all around the world. Consequently, various mutations occurred and were soon established during this period.

=== Timeline ===
- 1870–75 The very first registered sudden captive-bred colour mutations were Suffused Green (a.k.a. Dilute Yellow), Greywinged Green and either one of the two types of Lutino (NSLino &/or SLino) mutations. All three occurred in aviaries in Britain or continental Europe. Of these three mutations, only the Suffused Green (a.k.a. Dilute Yellow) has survived. The latter was easily reproduced in great numbers and is nowadays very well established. The first Lutino mutation quickly vanished but it was re-established in Europe some time between 1931 and 1933.
- 1878–85 The Skyblue mutation suddenly occurred in continental Europe, most probably in Uccle, Belgium. Surprisingly, this variety was not imported in England until 1910.
- 1915 Single-Factored Dark-Green (a.k.a. Dark-Green) in France (where they were then commonly called 'Laurel' which is the French word for Bay (leaf &/or tree))
- 1916 Double-Factored Dark-Green (a.k.a. Olive) in France.
- 1918–28 Respectively, Greywinged Green and Greywinged Blue appeared in England and continental Europe.
- 1920
  - Crest-Factor in Australia.
  - Suffused Blue (a.k.a. Dilute White) in England and France.
  - Single-Factored Dark_Blue (a.k.a. Cobalt) in France.
- 1921 Double-Factored Dark_Blue (a.k.a. Mauve) in France.
- 1930
  - Single-Factored Violet-Green (a.k.a. Violet Factor) in Australia (and were then 1st commonly called 'Satin Green')
  - The first Clearwinged Green (Yellowinged) appeared, developed by H. Pier in Sydney.
- 1931
  - Cinnamon in England, Australia & Germany.
  - An unknown type of Fallow in California, U.S. This soon vanished.
  - The Germanfallow in Germany, recently been genetically classified and identified as the Bronzefallow (a.k.a. Brownfallow).
  - A plum-eyed mutation, similar looking to Fallow mutations, occurred in England. This vanished or at least became very rare. This mutation was most probably the Brownwings, one of the rarest colour mutations of the species.
  - The first Albino specimens were produced in both England and continental Europe.
- 1932
  - Three Fallow mutations occurred in England which became known as the Englishfallow. In Australia these have been genetically classified and identified as the Dunfallow or Greybrownfallow (a.k.a. Australianfallow). The Beigefallow or Palebrownfallow has been classified in South-Africa, but no reference seems to be available on this particular mutation.
  - The recessive Anti-dimorphic Pied (a.k.a. Danish Pied a.k.a. Harlequin) in Denmark.
  - The Australian (a.k.a. Banded) Pied in Australia.
- 1933
  - Green Clearwinged (a.k.a. Yellow Wing) and Dominant Grey-Factor appear in Australia.
  - Both the NSL & the SL Lutino gene occurred in England and continental Europe.
  - Three Opaline mutations occurred. An Opaline Green hen was captured in the wild and sold to S. Terril in Adelaide. It was later reproduced and is most probably the ancestor of all Opaline specimens in Australia. Two sudden captive-bred Opaline mutations occurred in England and the Netherlands.
- 1934 Recessive grey factor in England.
- 1935 The various Yellowfaced_Blue and Goldenfaced_Blue occurred in several locations.
- 1939–46 Clearflighted_Dutchpied in Belgium.
- 1948
  - Texas Clearbodied (a.k.a. SL-Clearbody) in the U.S.
  - Dominant Clearbodied (a.k.a. Easley's Clearbodied) in the U.S.
  - The first Cinnamon-Ino (a.k.a. Lacewings) cross-over mutation was produced in Australia.
  - The first Dark-Eyed-Clear (DEC) variety was produced in Belgium by combining the ADM Pied (a.k.a. Danish/Recessive pied) with either one of the two Dutchpied varieties (Continental or Clearflighted).
- 1970–74 Single-Factored and Double-Factored Spangled specimens were produced in Australia.
- 1975 Saddleback specimens were produced in Australia.
- 1992 Blackface specimens make their first appearance in the Netherlands.
- 2010 White Cap bred in Australia. These birds have a yellow face, but with a white cap.

=== Notes ===
It is possible that the Greywings mutation survived as the ancestor of all actual Greywings. However, it could be that the mutation lay dormant in asymptomatic mutant specimens until it was re-established between 1918 and 1925. Blue Greywing specimens were produced later on in 1928.

It is possible that all Suffused mutation specimens and their varieties are descendants from the first captive mutant specimens. This would mean that Suffused is the oldest sudden captive-bred colour mutation of the Budgerigar species.
