= Whipper (budgerigar) =

Individual bird of New Zealand

Whipper (2003–2017) was a budgerigar from Winton, Southland District, New Zealand. His unusual appearance, long curly plumage, and vocalisations, which were caused by a genetic mutation called "feather duster" made him famous in his home country.

After being rejected by his mother, Whipper was cared for by a human owner. This early separation from his own species may have resulted in his unique vocal sounds.

== Mutation ==
Whipper's vet declared him as a mutant. Genetic colour variation is common within the species. However, Whipper's unique mutation is long curly feathers, short flightless wings and apparent blindness. It is suspected that the mutation, which is known to budgerigar breeders as the "feather duster budgerigar" mutation, caused unrestricted feather growth, resulting in the budgerigar's dishevelled appearance.

In 2017, it was reported that Whipper had recently died.

== Public notability ==
- "Whipper Fan Page". thepapnews.com. Archived from the original on 8 October 2009.
- Whipper the Mutant Parakeet. Uzoo. 3 December 2008 – via YouTube.
- "Welcome to our New Clinic!!" (PDF). Dairy Notes. Vol. 10, no. 1. Central Southland Vet Services. August 2004. Archived from the original (PDF) on 14 October 2008.

== See also ==
- Feather
- Breed
- List of individual birds
