= Australian Pied budgerigar mutation =

Genetic mutation affecting the colour of budgerigars

The Australian Pied budgerigar mutation is one of approximately 30 mutations affecting the colour of budgerigars. It is the underlying mutation of the Banded Pied variety.

== Appearance ==
All pied budgerigars are characterised by having irregular patches of completely clear feathers appearing anywhere in the body, head or wings. These clear feathers are pure white in blue-series birds and yellow in birds of the green series. Such patches are completely devoid of black melanin pigment. The remainder of the body is coloured normally.

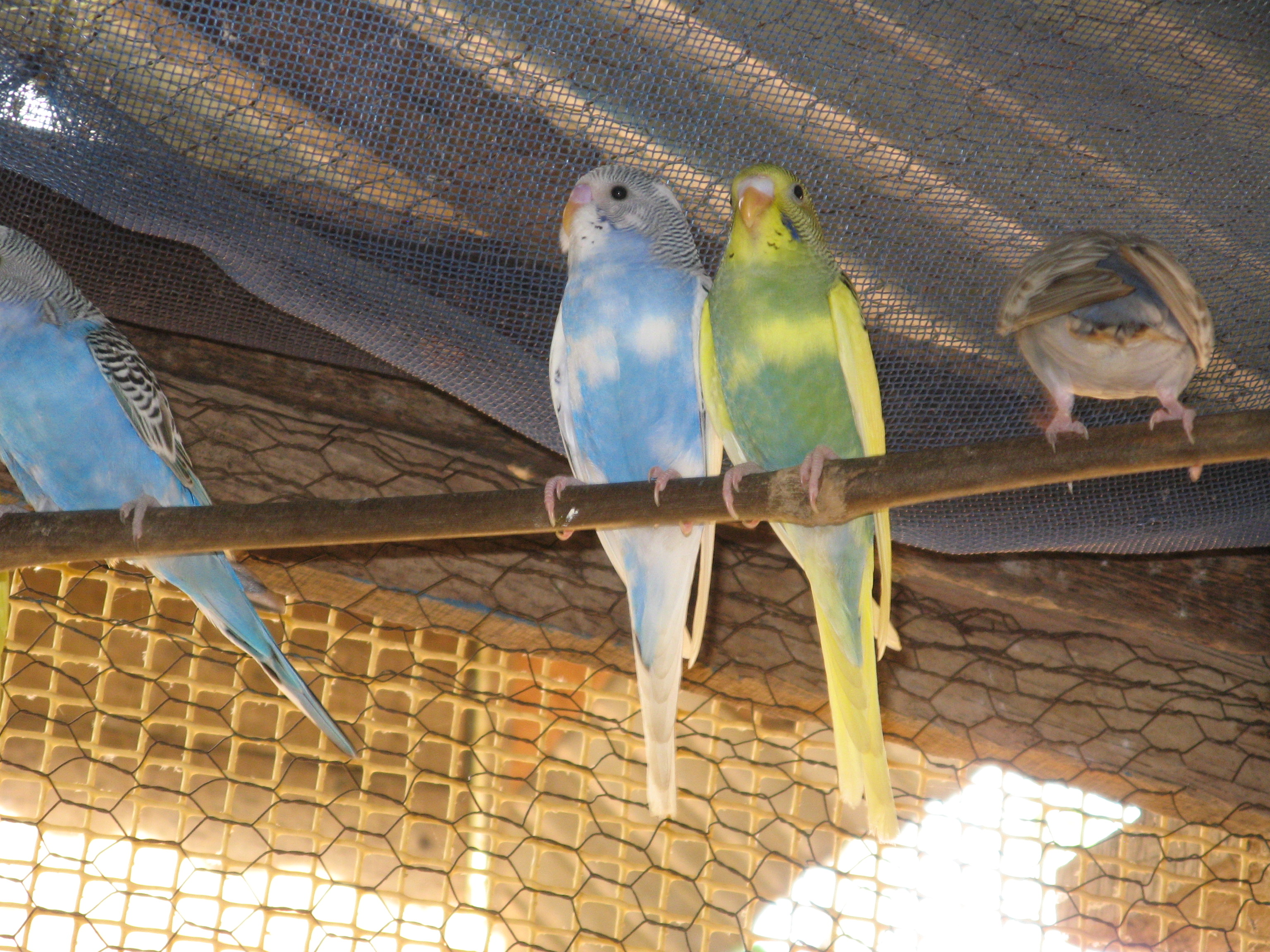
Two young Australian Pieds, a Cobalt and a Yellow-face II Cobalt (?)

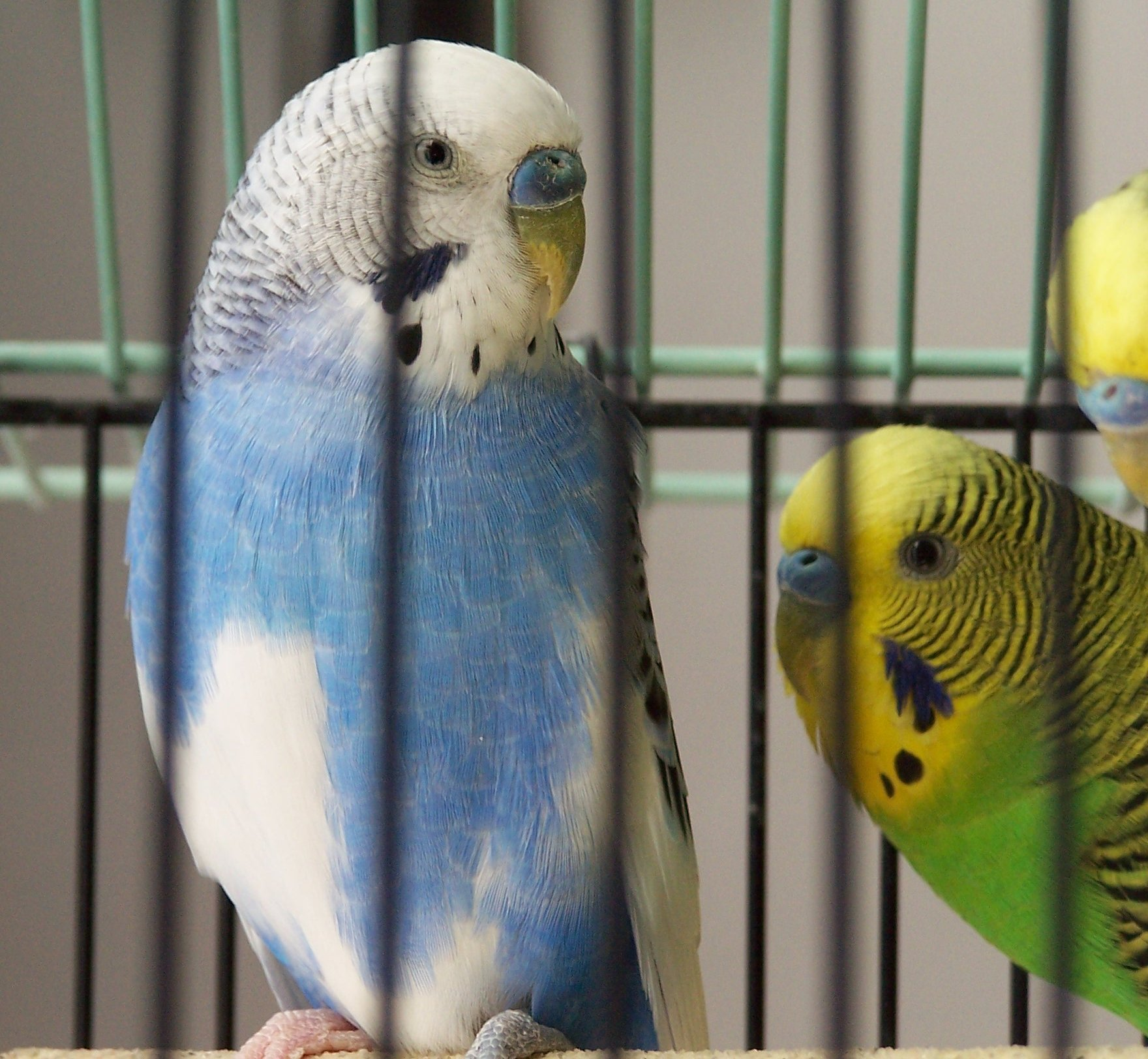
Opaline Cobalt Australian Pied cock

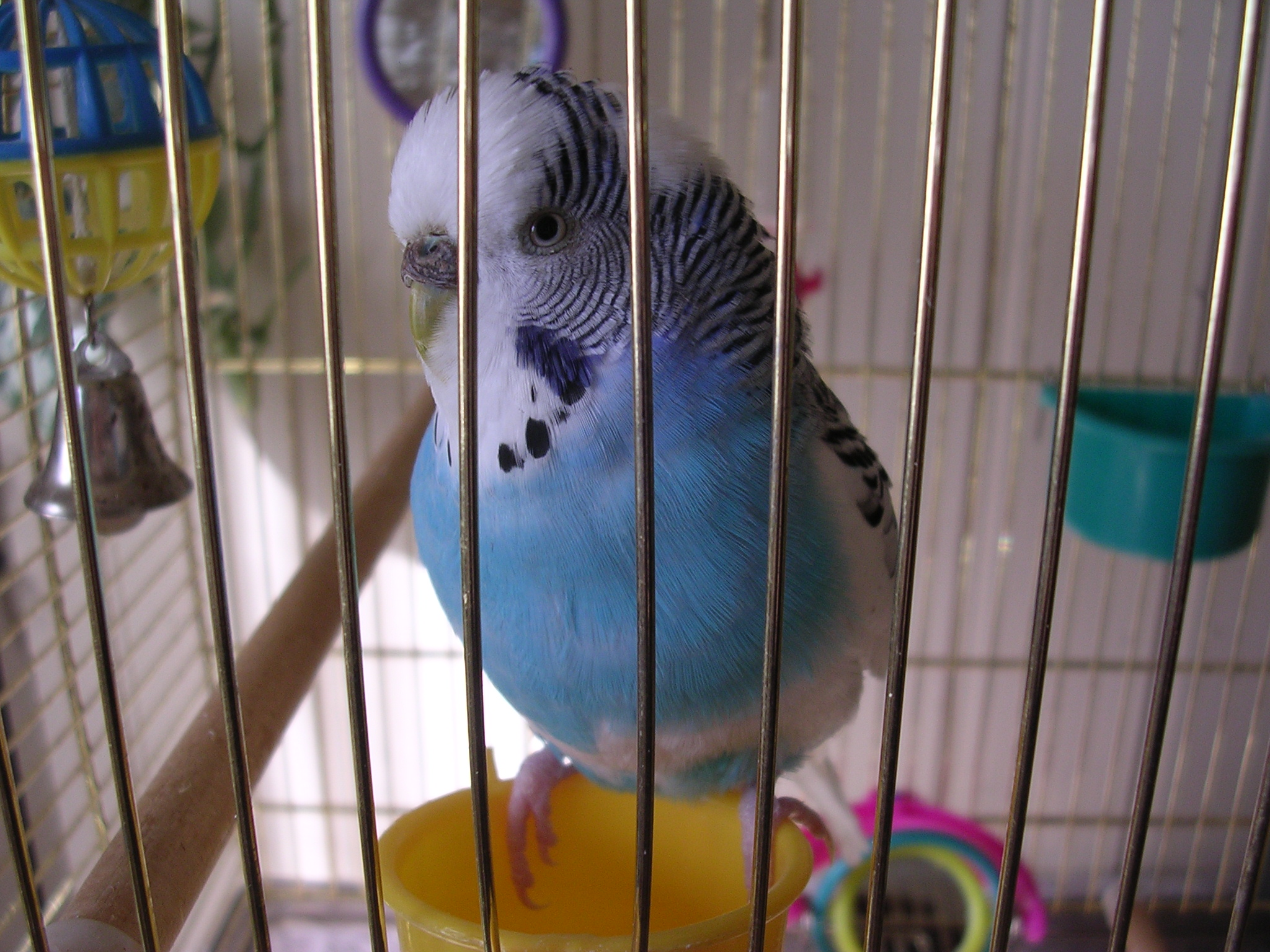
Cobalt Australian Pied hen

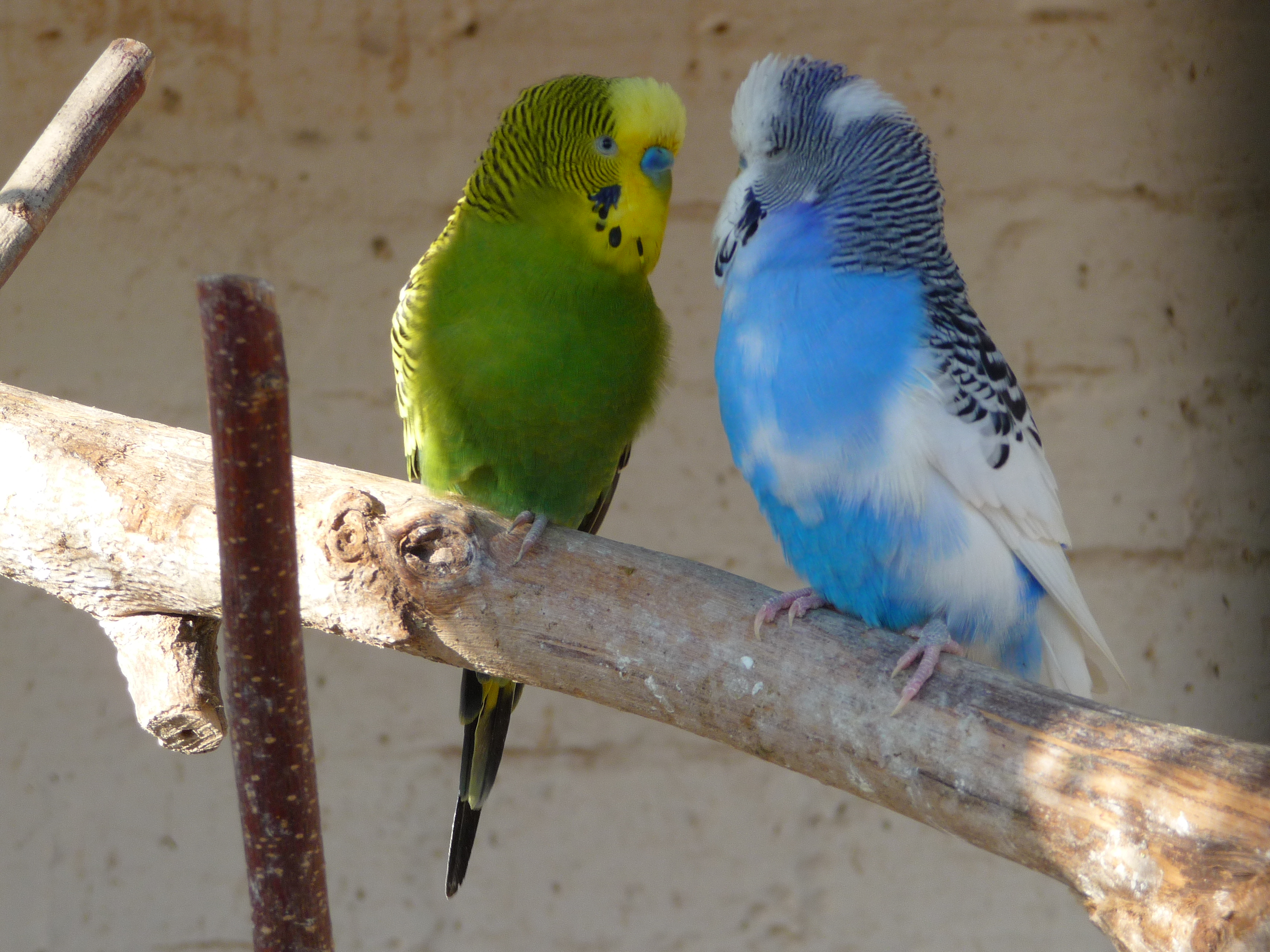
Cobalt Australian Pied cock with a Grey-Green cock

The Australian Pieds are very similar in appearance to the Clearflight Pieds, with a nape spot, clear areas on the wings and a clear area on the breast. They differ from the Clearflight Pied in the nape spot, which is not always present, and in their feet, which are usually pink. But the main point of difference is in the clear area of the body, which in the Australian Pied is located in the middle or lower breast, with the upper breast being always normally coloured, so that there is a clear division between the mask and the breast, just as in normal birds. In the Clearflight Pied the clear area on the breast, if present, is almost always adjacent to and running into the mask. Australian Pieds often have larger clear areas on the wings than Clearflight Pieds, with all primaries and many secondaries often clear, but this cannot be taken as a distinguishing feature as the pied areas are very variable in extent in both mutations. Australian Pieds have the usual white iris ring when adult, distinguishing them clearly from Recessive Pieds, which have no iris ring at any age.

In the Australian Pied the clear area often takes the form of a band running across the breast. Birds with such bands are highly prized, especially if the band is clear, sharp and symmetrical, and the feature is now quite common and distinctive due to selective breeding. Such birds comprise the Banded Pied variety.

== Historical notes ==
Many isolated appearances of pied or variegated budgerigars were reported in Britain, in continental Europe and in Australia in the late 1920s and early 1930s, but reliable reports of breeding results and detailed descriptions of their appearance during that period are rare. One of the earliest reports of the appearance of a budgerigar which could have been an Australian Pied was of a bird owned by W G Bowden - it had a clear nape spot and its breeding behaviour clearly showed a dominant inheritance pattern. Mr Bowden obtained or possibly bred the bird in 1931 - he did not report its source. The bird, a cock, was basically a Light Green but it had 'a yellow patch on the back of the head, another on the base of the rump' and 'a yellow streak, about a quarter of an inch in width, from the left wing butt to halfway across the breast'. A number of its flights were reported to be white or yellow. When mated to an unrelated hen in 1933 this cock produced 14 young over three nests, of which 5 showed some clear feathers on the nape of the neck. This could have been the first report of a Clearflight Pied or an Australian Pied; which of these it was is now impossible to tell as the only description available matches both types of Pied.

Several similar pied birds were reported around the same time in Germany, bred by Herr Krabbe and separately by Herr Schucke, by Madame Lecallier in France, by G Wilson and T L S Dooley in England, in Holland and in Scotland, but detailed descriptions and the mode of inheritance are unknown.

The present-day Australian Pieds, including the Banded Pied variety, are believed to be descended from a strain first established in Sydney in 1935 by Keith Ings.

They were first imported to Britain in 1957/8, when Mr A M Cooper of Caerleon, South Wales, bought two such birds, a Pied Green and a Pied Grey, both cocks, from a dealer in Bristol. Most of the Australian Pieds in Britain are descended from the Cooper strain.

== Genetics ==
The Australian Pied allele is dominant over its wild-type allele, although with less than 100% penetrance. The extent and distribution of the clear areas shown by both single-factor (SF) and double-factor (DF) Australian Pieds are variable. The range of variability of the two genotypes appears to be identical, so it is not possible to determine the genetic make-up by considering the extent of the clear areas. In both single- and double-factor birds this variability ranges from no clear feathers at all, via just one or two clear feathers, to over half the body area affected, although the clear areas in cocks tend to be larger than those of hens.

Genotype	Phenotype
Pa^{+}/ Pa^{+}	Normal
Pa^{+}/ Pa	SF Australian Pied
Pa / Pa	DF Australian Pied

The Australian Pied gene is located on one of the autosomal chromosomes. There is no known linkage of this gene with any other mutation.

There is no universally accepted genetic symbol for either the locus or mutant allele, so the symbol Pa^{+} for 'Pied, Australian' will be adopted here for the wild-type allele at this locus, and the symbol Pa for the Australian Pied mutant allele.

The factors governing the extent and distribution of the residual pigmentation are not known, although it is likely that at least some factors are sex-linked due to the different ranges in variability of the sexes.

Unlike the Clearflight Pied, the Australian Pied does not produce any Dark-eyed Clears when crossed with the Recessive Pied.
