= Feather duster budgerigar =

Bird with pathological feather condition

Feather duster budgerigars (Melopsittacus undulatus), sometimes called budgerigar mops, are budgerigars that have a condition characterised by overly long feathers that do not stop growing at usual periods, giving the bird the appearance of a feather duster. This condition is sometimes known as chrysanthemum feathering. The contour, tail and flight feathers do not stop growing, and they do not have the necessary barbs and barbules for the feather's structure to interlock. The shaft (calamus) is also curved, and so the feathers appear deformed and fluffed out. Individuals with this condition often appear less alert than nest mates. In addition, they are small and some have other defects such as microphthalmia. They lack vigour, often cannot fly and die within a year of hatching. There is no treatment for the condition; birds are often euthanized in the nest.

The condition may be a genetic disorder, caused by a herpesvirus, or perhaps caused by both.

== See also ==
- Whipper (budgerigar)
