= Dominant Clearbody budgerigar mutation =

Genetic mutation affecting the colour of budgerigars

The Dominant Clearbody budgerigar mutation is one of approximately 30 mutations affecting the colour of budgerigars. It is the underlying mutation of the Easley Clearbody variety.

Over the years many mutations have been reported which produce a (relatively) clear yellow or white body with normal black or dark wing markings, approximating to the beautiful painting of a (hypothetical) "laced Yellow" by R A Vowles shown in Dr M D S Armour's book, "Exhibition Budgerigars". In an article published in Cage and Aviary Birds Dr T Daniels summarised those that were known in 1981. Many of these failed to become established, and others, reported separately, may have been the same mutation which appeared in different parts of the world. The Dominant Clearbody was one which was established successfully, probably twice, in both the US and Australia.

== Appearance ==
The mutation now known as the Dominant or Easley Clearbody was first described by its breeder, C F Easley. He said, "The body colour is changed from blue or green to white or yellow and the wing barring, flights and shaft feathers become jet black. Throat spots are black and the cheek patch is pale bluish or lavender." This describes perhaps the idealised variety, and only double factor Clearbodies approach this ideal. He goes on to say, "the clearness of the body and the darkness of the wing barrings depends on the strength of the factor in the individual bird", indicating the variability in residual suffusion and the intensity of the black markings.

== Historical notes ==
The alternative name of this mutation, 'Easley Clearbody', comes from the name of the breeder who discovered and established the mutation: C F Easley of Rialto, California. He has described in detail how this mutation, which he called 'Laced Clear', arose and was established. In January 1957 he paired an Opaline Dark Green cock to a Cobalt hen and bred a hen described as an "Opaline Greywing Dark Green with a yellow body and exceedingly dark grey wing markings". In January 1958 this hen was paired to a normal Dark Green cock and two further mutants were bred in a nest of four chicks, both cocks, with yellow bodies, black wing markings, black long tail feathers and pale violet (lavender) cheek patches, one in Opaline form and one Normal.

Mr Easley went on to establish a stud of over 200 Clearbodies. The early mutants showed considerable body suffusion but birds with much less suffusion were bred later. In a series of experiments, Mr Easley determined that the suffusion and depth of wing markings were variable, but the lavender cheek patch remained an unchanging characteristic. In establishing his stud, Mr Easley proved the mutation to be an autosomal dominant.

It appears Mr Easley did not dispose of any of his 'Laced Clears' until 1965, when he placed the first advertisement offering them for sale in the American Budgerigar Society Bulletin.

Mr Easley died in 1973, having previously disposed of all his stock, and no direct link to present-day Dominant Clearbodies has been established, but in the late 1970s Jeffrey Shultz of Highlands, Texas, had Clearbodies with lavender cheek patches which were due to a dominant mutation, so these were almost certainly descended from or related to the Easley Clearbodies. Around the same time Ben Pawlik of San Antonio, Texas, had birds he believed were of the Easley variety.

Ghalib Al-Naser has described how Dominant Clearbodies came to Europe from the USA. Reinhard Molkentin imported two Dominant Clearbody cocks from California in 1990 and in 1992 Wilfried Kopp obtained some of their descendants from Herr Molkentin. Later, Dominant Clearbodies were imported to the UK when Gren and Pat Norris obtained an Opaline Cinnamon Grey Dominant Clearbody from Reinhard Molkentin in 2000 (who was by then in South Africa) and Ghalib Al-Nasser imported a Grey Green Dominant Clearbody cock from Wilfried Kopp in Germany in 2001, adding two further cocks later. It seems likely that all the Dominant Clearbodies in Europe, including the UK, are descended from the original two imported by Herr Molkentin from California in 1990.

However, it may be that the Dominant Clearbody made its first appearance in Beverley, South Australia, in the aviaries of Bob Hancock, who bred what he called Blackwing Yellows and Blackwing Silvers for many years. This mutation first made its appearance around 1933, when a Blackwing Silver hen and four Skyblues were bred from a pair of Skyblues. The Blackwing Silver had a white body with a faint blue suffusion on the rump, normal wing markings, a black eye, black long tail feathers and a silver-grey cheek flash. This hen, paired to a Dilute Skyblue cock, produced a Blackwing Silver cock and from these two all subsequent Blackwing Silvers and later Blackwing Yellows were bred. He established that the mutation is dominant and not sex-linked. The description of these two autosomal dominant mutations is so similar that it seems very likely that they are identical.

== Genetics ==
The Dominant Clearbody allele is dominant over its wild-type allele, so a bird possessing a single Dominant Clearbody allele (the heterozygote or single-factor Dominant Clearbody) is converted from the wild-type Light Green to a Dominant Clearbody (SF) Light Green as described in Appearance above. That is, the presence of a single Dominant Clearbody allele is sufficient to permit almost the full expression of the mutation.

The double-factor Dominant Clearbody, with two Dominant Clearbody alleles, is believed to have a clearer body and darker wing markings than the single-factor Dominant Clearbody.

The Dominant Clearbody gene is located on one of the autosomal chromosomes. There is no known linkage of this gene with any other mutation.
