= Clearflight Pied budgerigar mutation =

Genetic mutation affecting the colour of budgerigars

The Clearflight Pied budgerigar mutation is one of approximately 30 mutations affecting the colour of budgerigars. It is the underlying mutation of the Continental Clearflight and Dutch Pied varieties. The Dark-eyed Clear variety results when the Recessive Pied and Clearflight Pied characters are combined.

== Appearance ==
All pied budgerigars are characterised by having irregular patches of completely clear feathers appearing anywhere in the body, head or wings. These clear feathers are pure white in blue-series birds and yellow in birds of the green series. Such patches are completely devoid of black melanin pigment. The remainder of the body is coloured normally.

The Clearflight Pied has two main characteristics: a clear patch at the nape of the neck and, ideally, completely clear primary flight and long tail feathers. All other features are normal. However, few birds approach the ideal; most show considerable variation in the extent of the clear areas. The nape spot is almost always present, but it varies considerably in size, affecting just one or two feathers in some birds or extending well down the back and round into the breast on others. It is these latter birds, with extensive clear areas on the breast, that are known as Dutch Pieds. While well-marked Clearflight Pieds have all 10 primaries and both long tail feathers clear, many specimens show just a few clear flight feathers and occasionally none at all are affected.

Poorly marked Clearflight Pieds can look rather like Recessive Pieds, but they may be distinguished from them by the white iris ring, which is always present in adult Clearflights. Some specimens may also resemble Australian Pieds but may be distinguished from them by two characteristics. Firstly, Clearflights have normally coloured blue-grey feet (Dominant Pieds usually have pink feet), and secondly, if they possess extensive clear areas on the breast, these always extends down from the mask whereas the clear areas of a Dominant Pied are always lower down on the abdomen with an area of normal body colour immediately below the mask and separated from it by a sharp dividing line.

Dark-eyed Clears are a combination of the Recessive Pied and Clearflight Pied mutations, having two Recessive Pied alleles and either one or two Clearflight Pied alleles. They are completely clear yellow or white with no trace of the ghost markings often seen in Inos. The eye is a solid jet black (which can in some lights appear a deep plum colour) with no visible iris ring like Recessive Pieds. The cheek patches are silvery white, and the beak, cere and feet are also like those of the Recessive Pied. Dark-eyed Clears shouldn't be mistaken for Black-eyed Clears which is another standalone mutation belonging to the a-locus.

== Historical notes ==
Many isolated appearances of pied or variegated budgerigars were reported in Britain, in continental Europe and in Australia in the late 1920s and early 1930s, but reliable reports of breeding results and detailed descriptions of their appearance during that period are rare. One of the earliest reports of the appearance of a budgerigar which could have been a Clearflight Pied was of a bird owned by W G Bowden - it had a clear nape spot and its breeding behaviour clearly showed a dominant inheritance pattern. Mr Bowden obtained or possibly bred the bird in 1931 - he did not report its source. The bird, a cock, was basically a Light Green but it had 'a yellow patch on the back of the head, another on the base of the rump' and 'a yellow streak, about a quarter of an inch in width, from the left wing butt to halfway across the breast'. A number of its flights were reported to be white or yellow. When mated to an unrelated hen in 1933 this cock produced 14 young over three nests, of which 5 showed some clear feathers on the nape of the neck. This could have been the first report of a Clearflight Pied or a Dominant Pied; which of these it was is now impossible to tell as the only description available matches both types of Pied.

Several similar pied birds were reported around the same time in Germany, bred by Herr Krabbe and separately by Herr Schucke, by Madame Lecallier in France, by G Wilson and T L S Dooley in England, in Holland and in Scotland, but detailed descriptions and the mode of inheritance are unknown.

L Raymaekers of Brussels was the first to establish a substantial strain of Clearflight Pied budgerigars, which he called White-flighted or Yellow-flighted budgerigars. These were all descended from a bird with a small clear head-patch which appeared in his aviaries in 1940. Some birds, almost certainly from this strain, had been imported to England well before 1947, as F W Wait of Hemsby, near Yarmouth, advertised Whiteflights and Yellowflights for sale in that year.

Some variegated birds established in Holland also showed a clear head-patch but in addition they showed extensive clear areas down the back, on the breast (continuous with the mask) and on the wings. It was birds marked like this that became known as Dutch Pied. For many years this was believed to be a separate mutation from the mutation we now know as the Clearflight Pied, but by 1961 it was 'almost certain' that these were the same basic mutation, the difference between them being due to the selection of different modifying genes by breeders.

Reports that "Albinos and Lutinos with black eyes" were being bred appeared in Europe in the late 1940s. Initially these were believed to be a separate mutation, but after a time it was established they were a composite variety containing both the Clearflight Pied and the Recessive Pied mutations. When Clearflight Pieds were paired with Recessive Pieds and the resulting Clearflights/Recessive Pied young were paired back to Recessive Pieds, some birds were produced with one Clearflight Pied allele and two Recessive Pied alleles. These birds were not pied, but were entirely clear, either yellow or white, but unlike Inos these birds had a totally black eye. Later they became known as Black-eyed Clears.

== Genetics ==
The Clearflight Pied allele is dominant over its wild-type allele, although with less than 100% penetrance. The extent and distribution of the clear areas shown by both single- and double-factor Clearflight Pieds are variable. The range of variability of the two genotypes appears to be identical, so it is not possible to determine the genetic make-up by considering the extent of the clear areas. In both single- and double-factor birds this variability ranges from no clear feathers at all, via just one or two clear feathers, to over half the body area affected, although the clear areas in cocks tend to be larger than those of hens.

Genotype	Phenotype
Pc^{+}/ Pc^{+}	Normal
Pc^{+}/ Pc	Clearflight Pied
Pc / Pc	Clearflight Pied

The Clearflight Pied gene is located on one of the autosomal chromosomes. There is no known linkage of this gene with any other mutation.

There is no universally accepted genetic symbol for either the locus or mutant allele, so the symbol Pc^{+} for 'Pied, clearflight' will be adopted here for the wild-type allele at this locus, and the symbol Pc for the Clearflight Pied mutant allele. Both Taylor and Warner and Martin used just P for the Clearflight Pied locus, but as there are two dominant pied mutations a notation which treats them equally, distinguishing them with a second letter, seems preferable.

The factors governing the extent and distribution of the residual pigmentation are not known, although it is likely that at least some factors are sex-linked due to the different ranges in variability of the sexes.

=== The Black-eyed Clear ===
Genotype	Phenotype
Pc^{+} r^{+}/ Pc r	SF Clearflight Pied/Recessive Pied
Pc r^{+}/ Pc r	DF Clearflight Pied/Recessive Pied
Pc^{+} r / Pc r	Black-eyed Clear (SF Clearflight)
Pc r / Pc r	Black-eyed Clear (DF Clearflight)

The combination of one or two Clearflight Pied alleles with two Recessive Pied alleles produces the Black-eyed Clear variety, with the appearance described above. This combination appears to result in the complete suppression of the melanin pigment in all the feathers, yet leaves the eyes jet-black. The two forms, with one or two Clearflight Pied alleles, are indistinguishable visually, but differ in their breeding behaviour.

Note: this combination of two pied mutations in the budgerigar should not be confused with the Black-eyed Clear recessive mutation found in some parrots.
