= Composite variety =

A composite variety is a plant population in which at least 70% of its progeny result from the crossing of the parent lines.

A composite variety is a variety developed by mixing the seeds of various phenotypically outstanding lines possessing similarities for various characteristics like height, seed size, seed color, maturity etc. Crossing among the selected varieties is possible because the species used are open pollinated. Consequently, composite varieties are genetically heterogeneous, and an exact reconstitution of the composite variety is not possible.

Farmers can use their own saved seed for 3 to 4 years, after that seed should be replaced as the initial performance of the composite cross variety will have drifted from the original type.
