= Recessive Pied budgerigar mutation =

Avian color mutation

The Recessive Pied budgerigar mutation is one of approximately 30 mutations affecting the colour of budgerigars. It is the underlying mutation of the Danish Pied variety, aka Harlequin. It is believed by Inte Onsman of MUTAVI to be the same mutation as the Anti-dimorphic Pied (ADM Pied) found in some parrots. The Dark-eyed Clear variety results when the Recessive Pied and Clearflight Pied characters are combined.

== Appearance ==
All pied budgerigars are characterised by having irregular patches of completely clear feathers appearing anywhere in the body, head or wings. Such patches are devoid of the black melanin pigment and show just the ground colour—yellow in green-series birds and white in blue-series. The remainder of the body is coloured normally.

The Recessive Pied mutation is an autosomal recessive trait and thus the phenotype appears in birds only with both alleles mutated. The Recessive Pied phenotype often results in extensive clear area and many birds are predominantly clear with only small irregularly shaped areas of normal pigmentation. The factors governing the distribution of the residual pigmentation are not known. Like other pieds, there is a large variation in the position and extent of the variegated patches, but the typical striations are almost always present around the eyes. In general, hens are more heavily marked on the wings than cocks. The clear areas, although normally coloured, seem to carry a heightened brilliance which is considered particularly attractive in the stronger colours such as Cobalt, Violet and Dark Green.

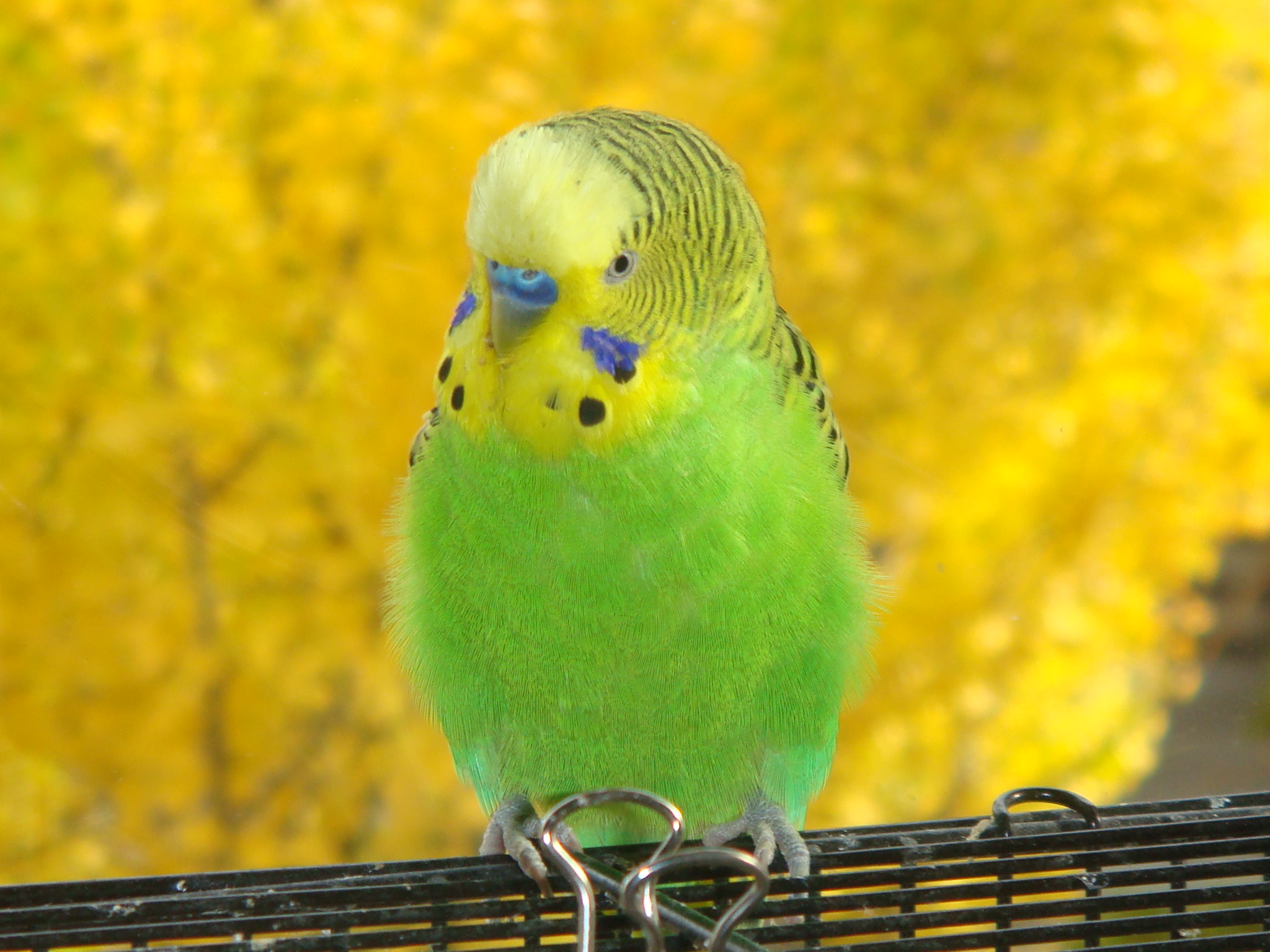
Light Green cock

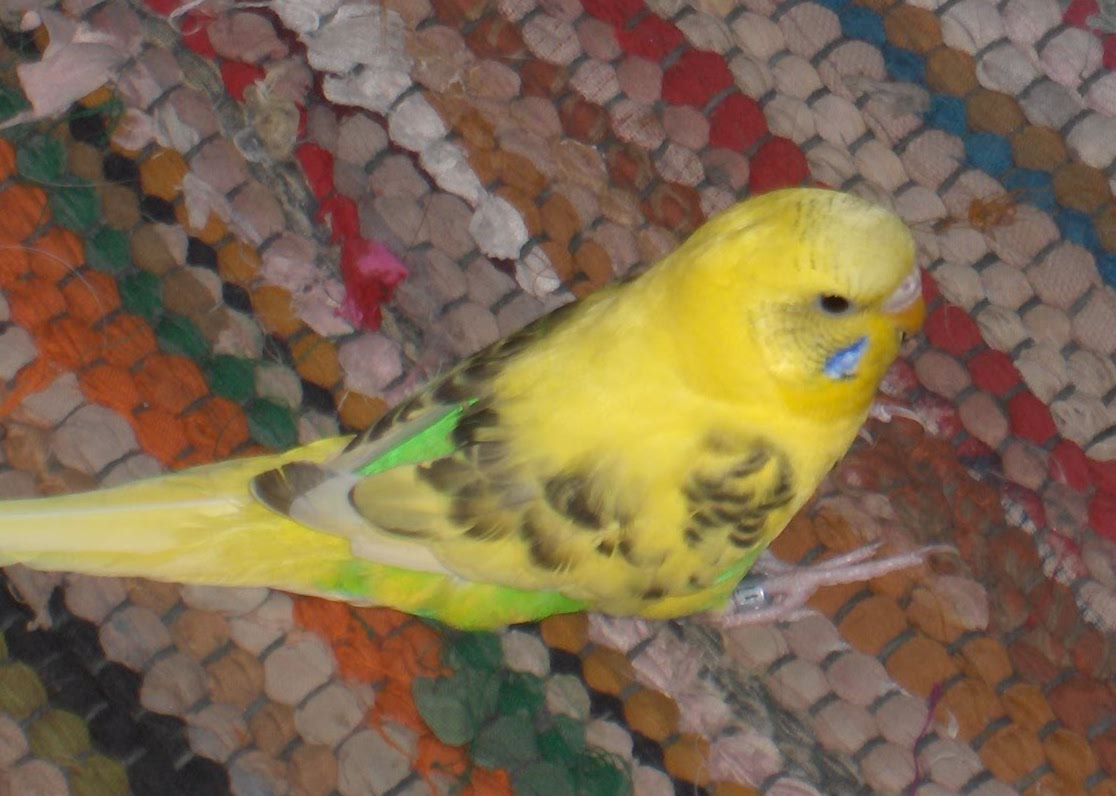
Light Green Recessive Pied hen in nest feather

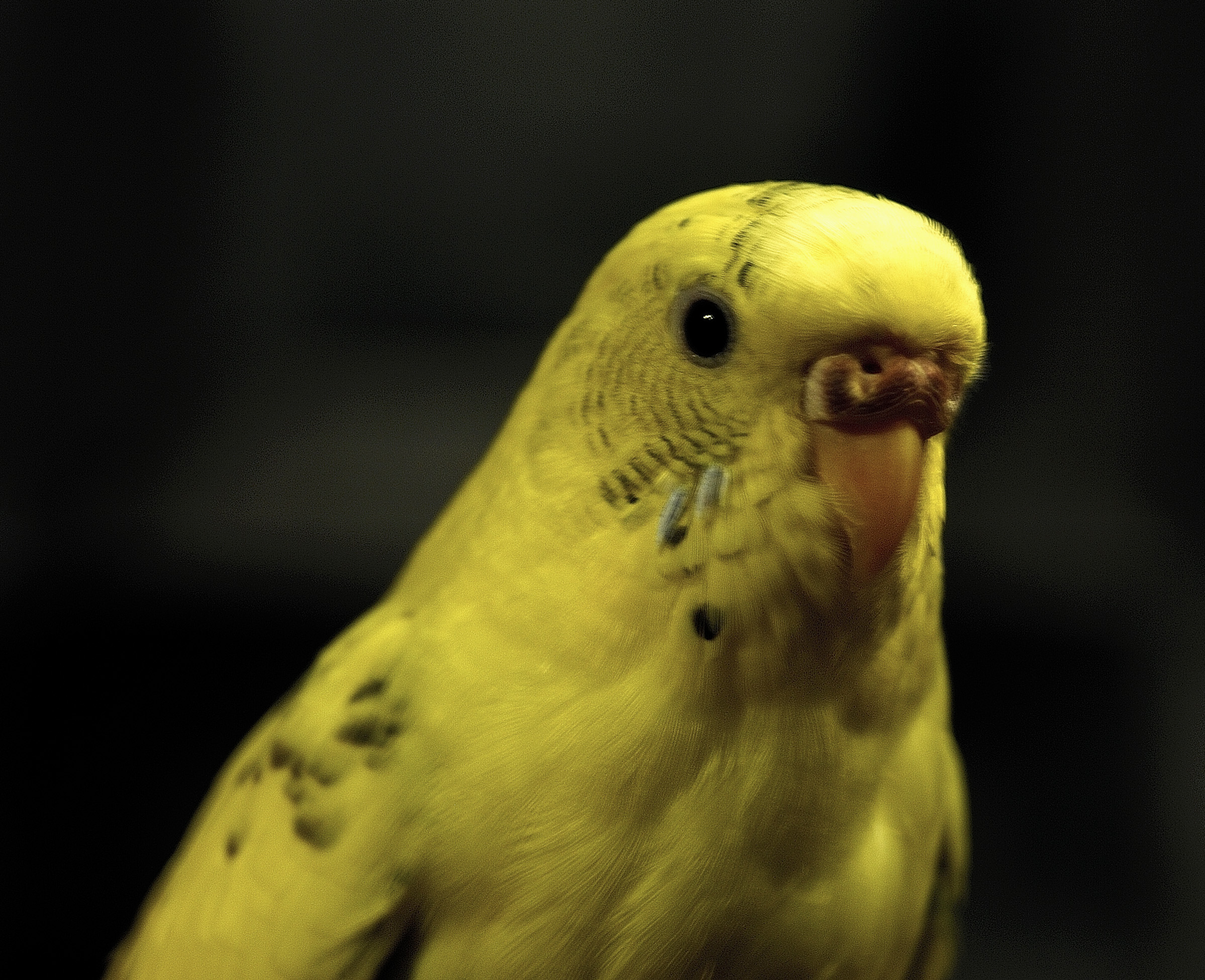
Light Green Recessive Pied hen

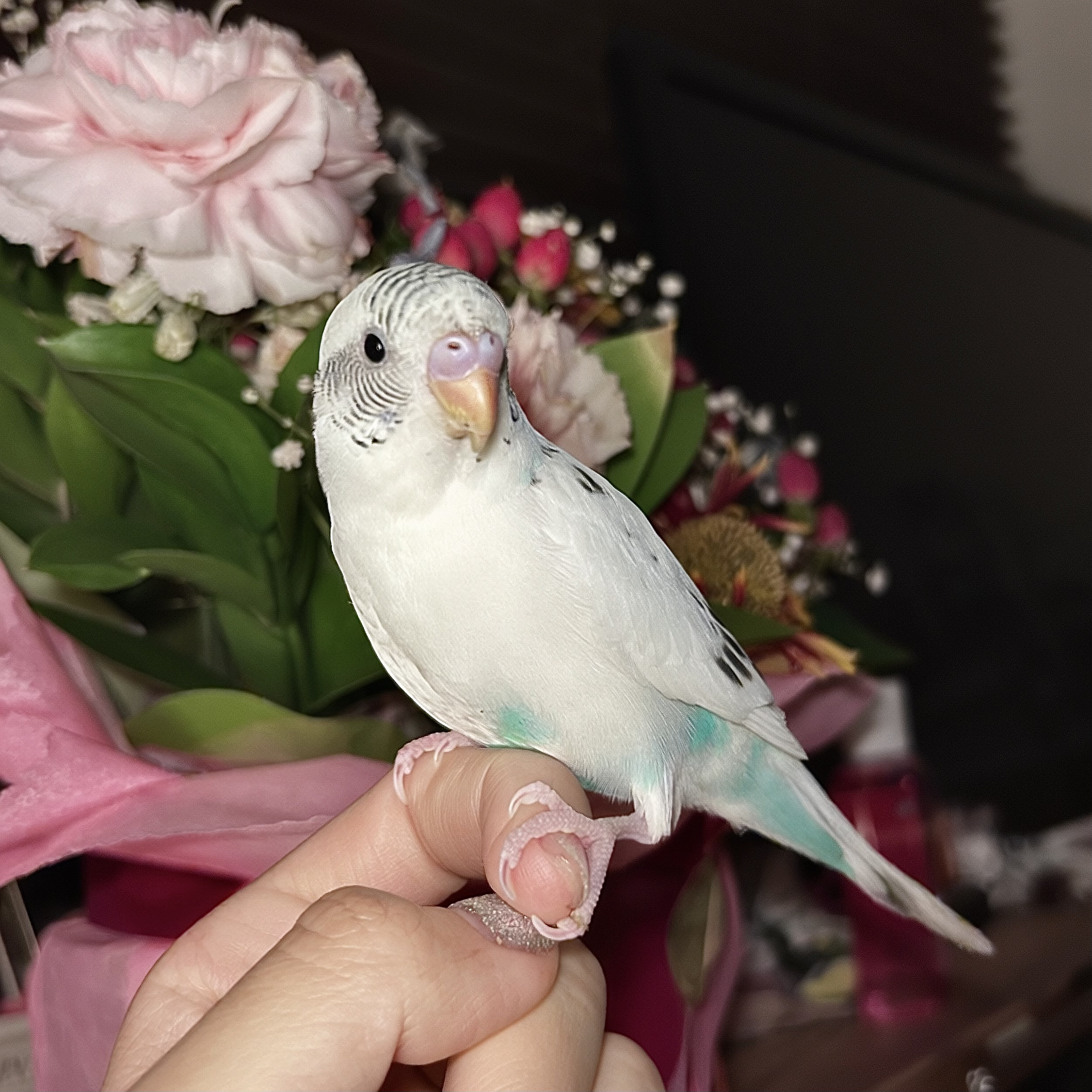
Light Blue Recessive Pied juvenile
