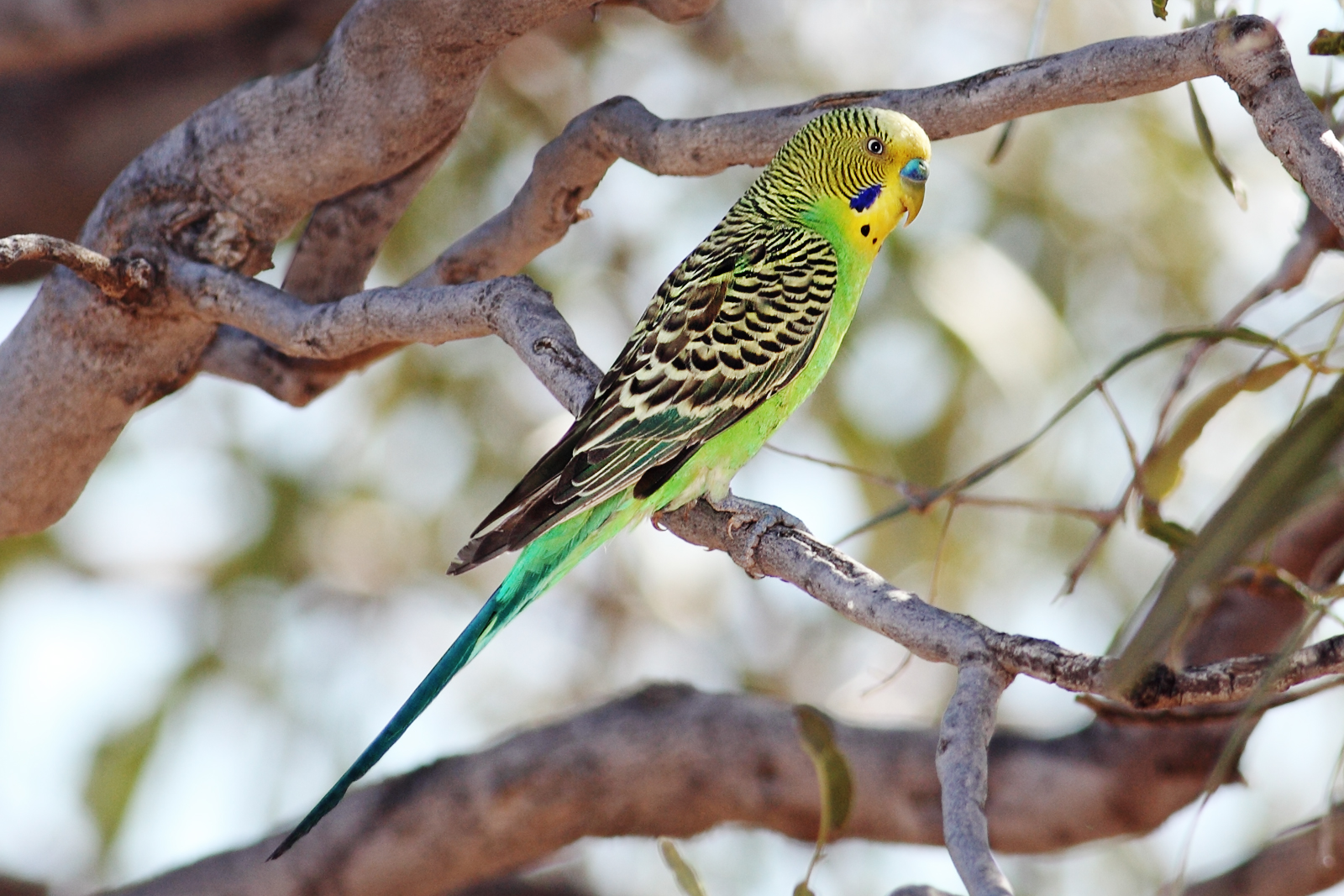
- Blue cere indicates male
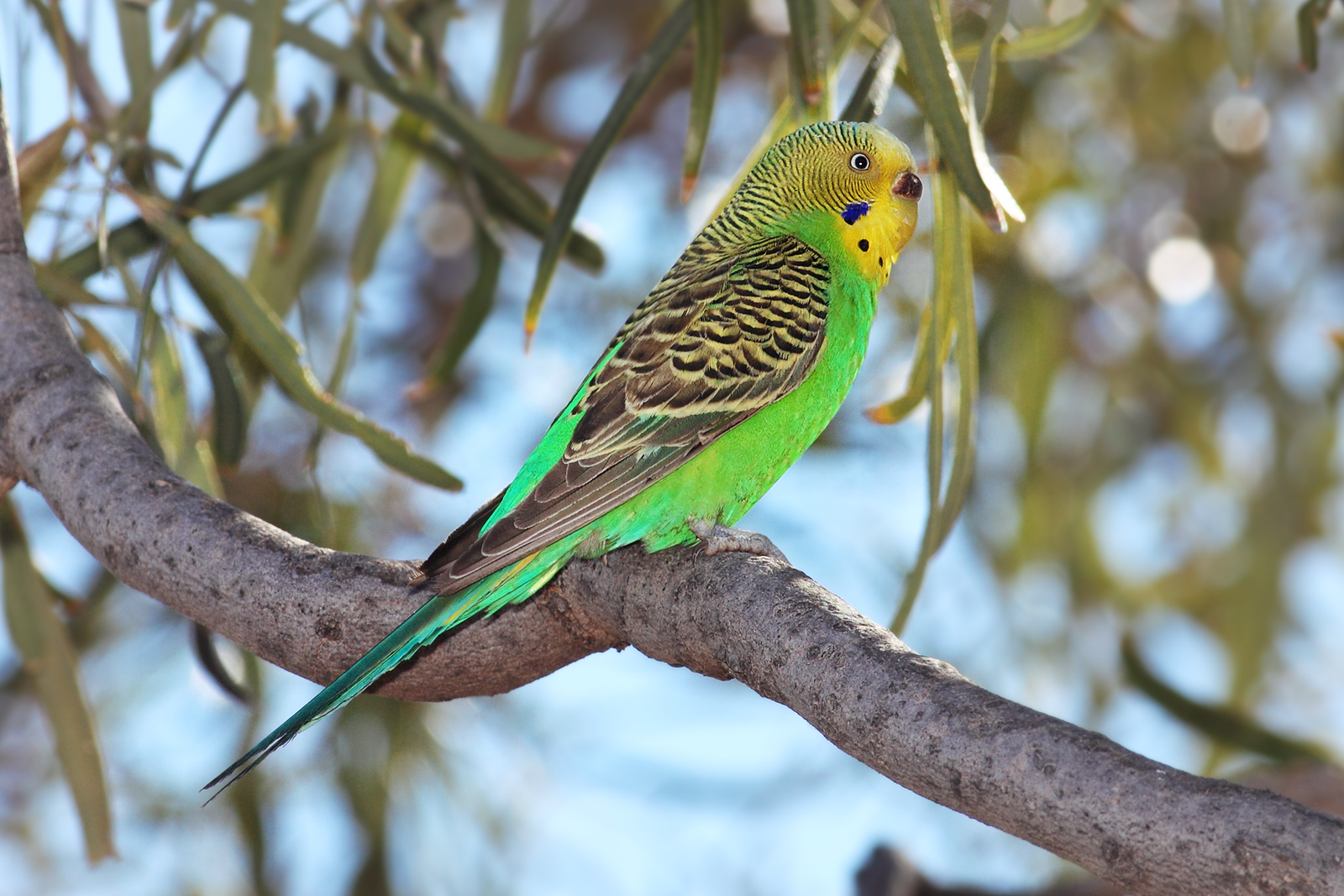
- Flaking brown cere indicates female in breeding condition

Conservation status
- Least Concern (IUCN 3.1)

Scientific classification
- Kingdom: Animalia
- Phylum: Chordata
- Class: Aves
- Order: Psittaciformes
- Family: Psittaculidae
- Subfamily: Loriinae
- Tribe: Melopsittacini
- Genus: Melopsittacus; Gould, 1840
- Species: M. undulatus

Binomial name
- Melopsittacus undulatus (Shaw, 1805)
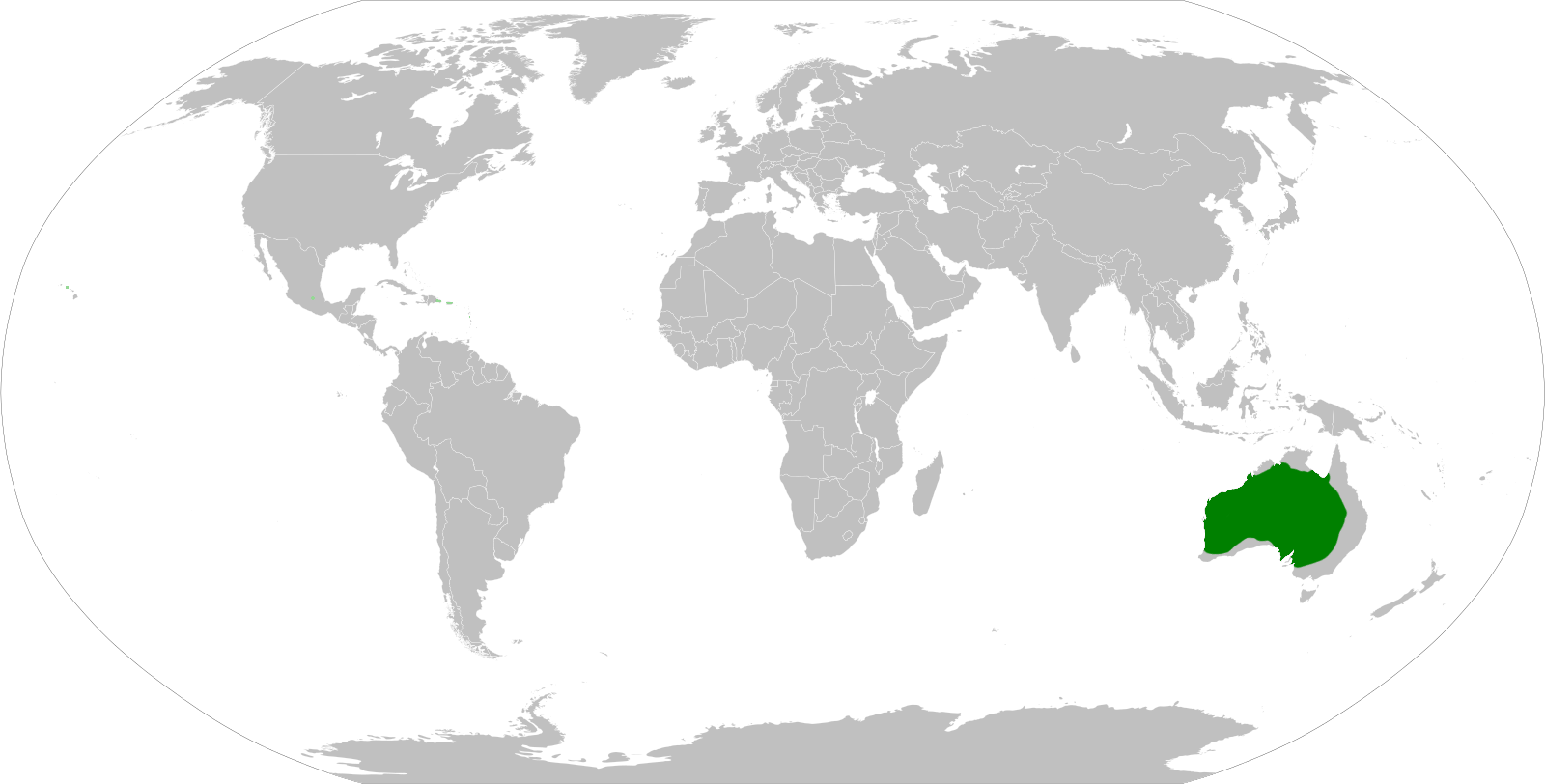
- The range of the Budgerigar; Native range: green Introduced range: light green

= Budgerigar =

Budgerigar Temporal range: Pliocene–Holocene

Small, long-tailed, seed-eating parakeet

The budgerigar (/ˈbʌdʒərɪɡɑːr, -əriː-/ BUJ-ər-ih-gar, -ə-ree-; Melopsittacus undulatus), also known as the common parakeet, shell parakeet or budgie (/ˈbʌdʒi/ BUJ-ee), is a small, long-tailed, seed-eating parrot native to Australia. Naturally, the species is green and yellow with black, scalloped markings on the nape, back, and wings. Budgies are bred in captivity with colouring of blues, whites, yellows, greys, and even with small crests. Juveniles and chicks are monomorphic (the sexes are visually indistinguishable), while adults are told apart by their cere colouring and their behaviour.

The species is monotypic, meaning it is the only member of the genus Melopsittacus, which is the only genus in the tribe Melopsittacini. The budgerigar is closely related to lories and the fig parrots.

The origin of the budgerigar's name is unclear. First recorded in 1805, budgerigars are popular pets around the world due to their small size, low cost, and ability to mimic human speech. They are the third most popular pet in the world, after the domesticated dog and cat. Budgies are nomadic flock parakeets that have been bred in captivity since the 19th century. In both the wild and in captivity, budgerigars breed opportunistically and in pairs.

They are found wild throughout the drier parts of Australia, where they have survived harsh inland conditions for over five million years. Their success can be attributed to a nomadic lifestyle and their ability to breed while on the move.

== Etymology ==
Several possible origins for the name budgerigar have been proposed. One origin could be that budgerigar may be a mispronunciation or alteration of the Gamilaraay word gidjirrigaa (Aboriginal pronunciation: [ɡ̊iɟiriɡaː]) or gijirragaa from the Yuwaalaraay. Another possible origin is that budgerigar might be a modified form of budgery or boojery (Australian English slang for "good") and gar ("cockatoo"). While many references mention "good" as part of the meaning, and a few specify "good bird", it is quite possible that reports by those local to the region are more accurate in specifying the direct translation as "good food".

Alternative spellings include budgerygah and betcherrygah, the latter used by Indigenous people of the Liverpool Plains in New South Wales.

Alternative names for the budgerigar include shell parrot or shell parakeet, warbling grass parakeet, canary parrot, zebra parrot, flight bird, and scallop parrot. Although more often used as a common name for small parrots in the genus Agapornis, the name "lovebird" has been used for budgerigars, because of their habit of close perching, mutual preening, and their long term pair-bonds.

The genus name Melopsittacus is coined from Ancient Greek, meaning "melodious parrot". The species name undulatus is Latin for "undulated" or "wave-patterned".

== Taxonomy ==
Evolutionary history

- parrots
  - - - Lories and lorikeets
      - Budgerigar
    - Fig parrots
      genera Cyclopsitta & Psittaculirostris
  - ... other parrots

Phylogenetic chart

The budgerigar was first described by George Shaw in 1805, and given its current binomial name by John Gould in 1840. The budgerigar was once proposed to be a link between the genera Neophema and Pezoporus, based on the barred plumage. However, recent phylogenetic studies using DNA sequences place the budgerigar very close to the lories (tribe Loriini) and the fig parrots (tribe Cyclopsittini).

== Description ==
Anatomy of a male budgerigar

Wild budgerigars average 18 cm (7 in) long, weigh 30–40 grams (1.1–1.4 oz), 30 cm (12 in) in wingspan, and display a light green body colour, while their mantles display pitch-black mantle markings (blackish in fledglings and immatures) edged in clear yellow undulations. The forehead and face is yellow in adults.

Prior to their adult plumage, young individuals have blackish stripes down to the cere in young individuals until around 3–4 months of age. They display small, iridescent blue-violet cheek patches and a series of three black spots across each side of their throat. The two outermost throat spots are situated at the base of each cheek patch. The tail is cobalt, and outside tail feathers display central yellow flashes. Their wings have greenish-black flight feathers and black coverts with yellow fringes along with central yellow flashes, which only become visible in flight or when the wings are outstretched. Bills are olive grey and legs blueish-grey, with zygodactyl toes.

In their natural Australian habitat, budgerigars are noticeably smaller than those in captivity. This particular parrot species has been bred in many other colours and shades in captivity (e.g. blue, grey, grey-green, pieds, violet, white, yellow-blue). Pet store individuals will commonly be blue, green, or yellow. Like most parrot species, budgerigar plumage fluoresces under ultraviolet light – a phenomenon possibly related to courtship and mate selection.

The colour of the cere (the area containing the nostrils) differs between the sexes, being a lavender/baby blue in males, pale brownish/white (non breeding) to brown (breeding) in females, and pink in immature birds of both sexes (usually of a more even purplish-pink colour in young males). Some female budgerigars develop brown cere only during breeding time, which later returns to the normal colour. Young females can often be identified by a subtle, chalky whiteness that starts around the nostrils. Males that are either albino, lutino, dark-eyed clear or recessive pied (Danish pied or harlequin) retain the immature purplish-pink cere colour for their entire lives.

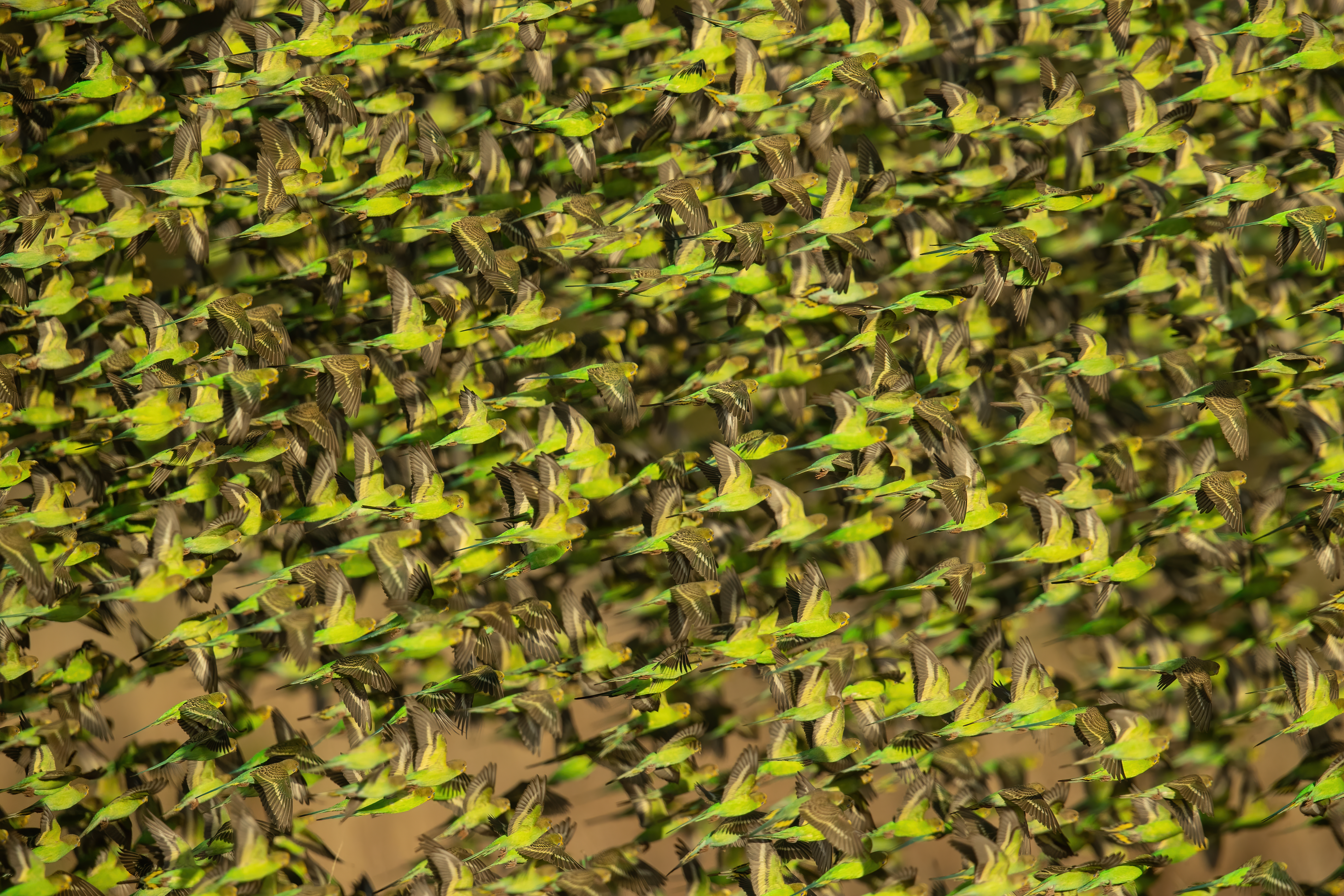
A flock of wild budgerigars in flight at Mount Hope, New South Wales, Australia

Mature males usually have a cere of light to dark blue, but in some particular colour mutations it can be periwinkle, lavender, purplish or pink – including dark-eyed clears, Danish pieds (recessive pieds) and inos, which usually display much rounder heads. Female budgerigars display more dominant behaviour compared to males of the species and may act aggressively towards them.

Budgerigars have tetrachromatic colour vision, although all four classes of cone cells will not operate simultaneously unless under sunlight or a UV lamp. The ultraviolet spectrum brightens their feathers to attract mates. The throat spots in budgerigars reflect UV and can be used to distinguish individual birds. While ultraviolet light is essential to the good health of caged and pet birds, inadequate darkness or rest results in overstimulation.

=== Colour mutations ===
All captive budgerigars are divided into two basic series of colours; namely, white-based (blue, grey and white) and yellow-based (green, grey-green and yellow). Presently, at least 32 primary mutations (including violet) occur, enabling hundreds of possible secondary mutations (stable combined primary mutations) and colour varieties (unstable combined mutations).

== Ecology ==
Distribution map of budgerigar in Australia Distribution area Frequent occurrence Occasional occurrence Climate region key Equatorial Tropical Subtropical Grassland Desert Temperate

Budgerigars are nomadic and flocks move on from sites as environmental conditions change. Budgerigars are found in open habitats, primarily in scrublands, open woodlands, and grasslands of Australia. The birds are normally found in small flocks, but can form very large flocks under favourable conditions. The nomadic movement of the flocks is tied to the availability of food and water. Budgerigars have two distinct flight speeds which they are capable of switching between depending on the circumstance. Budgerigars sometimes swarm together in groups containing thousands of individuals.

Drought can drive flocks into more wooded habitat or coastal areas. They feed on the seeds of spinifex and grass, and sometimes ripening wheat. Budgerigars feed primarily on grass seeds. The species also opportunistically depredates growing cereal crops and lawn grass seeds. Due to the low water content of the seeds, they rely on the availability of fresh water.

Outside of Australia, a population of naturalised feral budgerigars was present near St. Petersburg, Florida for over 50 years. Increased competition for nesting sites from European starlings and house sparrows is thought to be a primary cause of the Florida population declining from the 1980s, and this population died out in 2014. Escaped pet budgerigars remain commonly observed throughout North America.

== Behaviour ==
=== Breeding ===
Breeding in the wild generally takes place between June and September in northern Australia and between August and January in the south, although budgerigars are opportunistic breeders and respond to rains when grass seeds become most abundant. Budgerigars are monogamous and breed in large colonies throughout their range. They show signs of affection to their flockmates by preening or feeding one another. Budgerigars feed one another by eating the seeds themselves, and then regurgitating it into their flockmate's mouth. Populations in some areas have increased as a result of increased water availability at farms. Nests are made in holes in trees, fence posts or logs lying on the ground; the four to six eggs are incubated for 18–21 days, with the young fledging about 30 days after hatching. In the wild, virtually all parrot species require a hollow tree or a hollow log as a nest site. Budgerigars will typically breed in captivity when provided with a nest box.

The eggs are typically one to two centimetres long and are pearl white without any colouration if fertile. Female budgerigars can lay eggs without a male partner, but these unfertilised eggs will not hatch. Females normally have a whitish tan cere; however, when the female is laying eggs, her cere turns a crusty brown colour. Certain female budgies may always keep a whitish tan cere or always keep a crusty brown cere regardless of breeding condition. A female budgerigar will lay her eggs on alternating days. After the first one, there is usually a two-day gap until the next. She will usually lay between four and eight eggs, which she will incubate (usually starting after laying her second or third) for about 21 days each. Females only leave their nests for very quick defecations, stretches and quick meals once they have begun incubating and are by then almost exclusively fed by their mate (usually at the nest's entrance). Females will not allow a male to enter the nest, unless he forces his way inside. Clutch size ranges from 6 to 8 chicks.

There is evidence of same-sex sexual behaviour amongst male budgerigars. It was originally hypothesised that they did this as a form of "courtship practice" so they were better breeding partners for females; however, an inverse relationship exists between participation in same-sex behaviour and pairing success.

=== Chick health ===
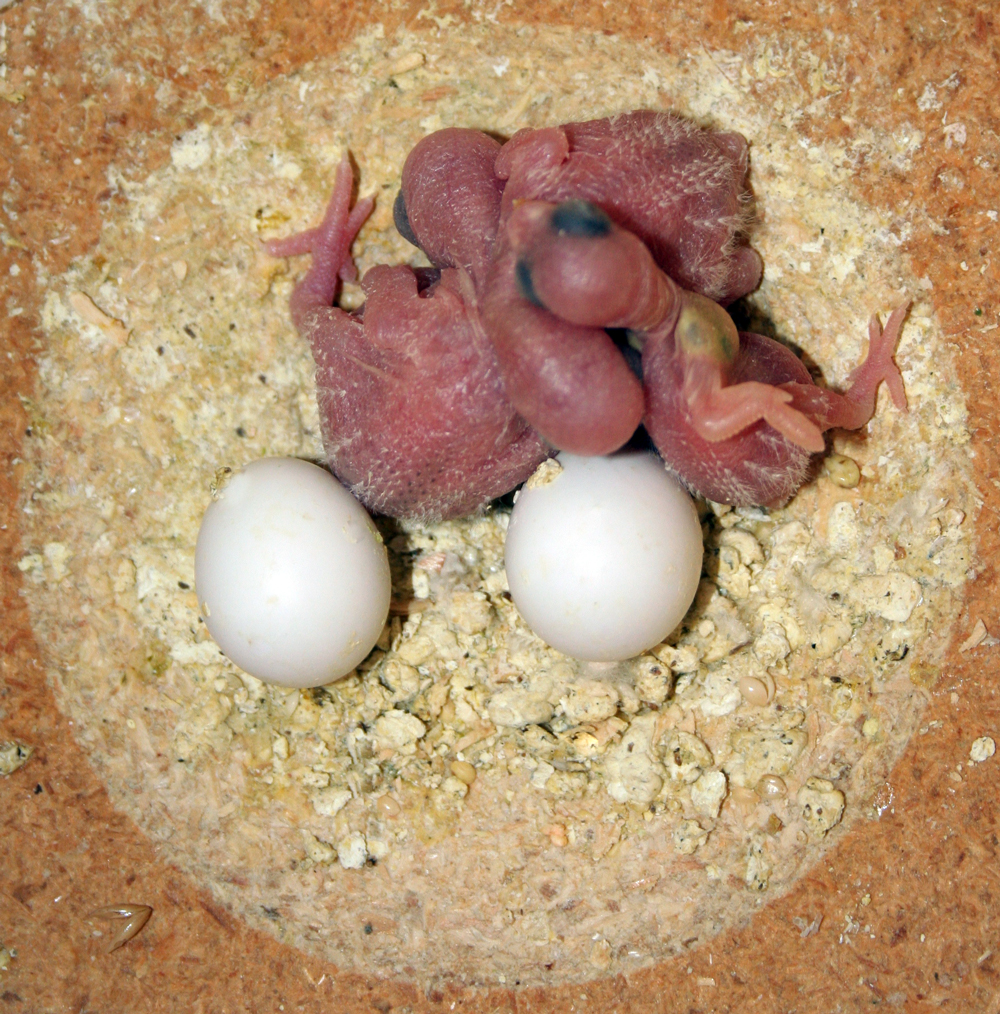
The chicks and eggs of budgerigar in nest box

Breeding difficulties arise for various reasons. Some chicks may die from diseases and attacks from adults. Other budgerigars (virtually always females) may fight over the nest box, attacking each other or a brood. Another problem may be the birds' beaks being under-lapped, where the lower mandible is above the upper mandible.

Most health issues and physical abnormalities in budgerigars are genetic. Care should be taken that birds used for breeding are active, healthy and unrelated. Budgerigars that are related or have fatty tumours or other potential genetic health problems should not be allowed to breed. Parasites (lice, mites, worms) and pathogens (bacteria, fungi and viruses), are contagious and thus transmitted between individuals through either direct or indirect contact.

In some cases, chicks will experience splay leg. This medical condition may be congenital or acquired through malnutrition. Chicks can be treated with splints although this method is not always successful in curing the affected bird. Preventative measures include using proper nesting box materials such as pine shavings and cleaning the nest box between uses.

=== Development ===
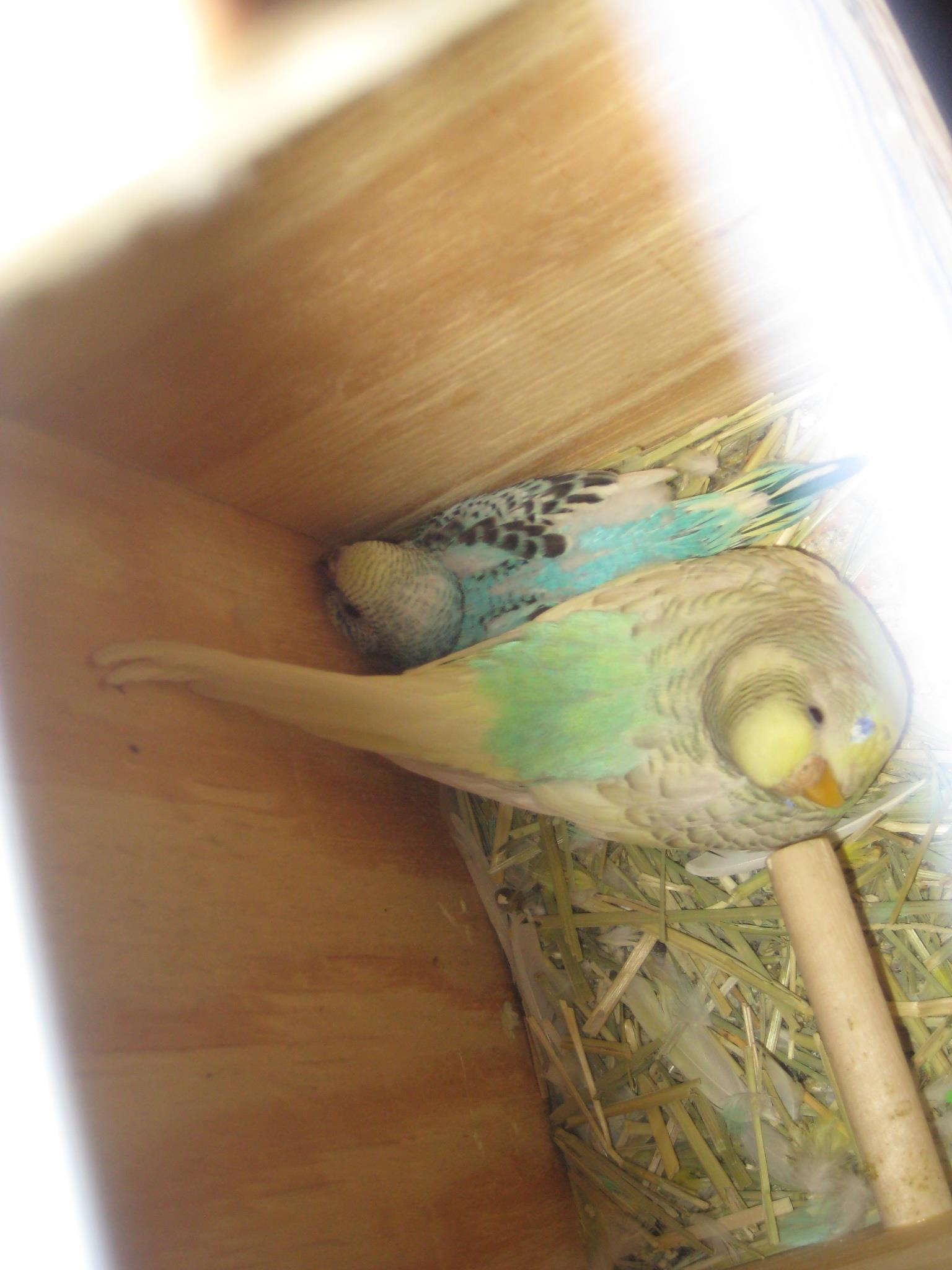
A three-week-old chick beginning to develop feathers and adult coloration.

Eggs take about 18–20 days before they start hatching. The hatchlings are altricial – blind, naked, unable to lift their head and totally helpless, and their mother feeds them and keeps them warm constantly. Around 10 days of age, the chicks' eyes will open, and they will start to develop feather down. The appearance of down occurs at the age for closed banding of the chicks.

They develop feathers around three weeks of age. (One can often easily note the colour mutation of the individual birds at this point.) At this stage of the chicks' development, the male usually has begun to enter the nest to help his female in caring for and feeding the chicks. Some budgerigar females, however, totally forbid the male from entering the nest and thus take the full responsibility of rearing the chicks until they fledge.

Depending on the size of the clutch and most particularly in the case of single mothers, it may then be wise to transfer a portion of the hatchlings (or best of the fertile eggs) to another pair. The foster pair must already be in breeding mode and thus either at the laying or incubating stages, or already rearing hatchlings.

As the chicks develop and grow feathers, they are able to be left on their own for longer periods of time. By the fifth week, the chicks are strong enough that both parents will be comfortable in staying out of the nest more. The youngsters will stretch their wings to gain strength before they attempt to fly. They will also help defend the box from enemies, mostly with their loud screeching. Young budgerigars typically fledge (leave the nest) around their fifth week of age and are usually completely weaned between six and eight weeks old. However, the age for fledging, as well as weaning, can vary slightly depending on the age and the number of surviving chicks. Generally speaking, the oldest chick is the first to be weaned. Although it is logically the last one to be weaned, the youngest chick is often weaned at a younger age than its older sibling(s). This can be a result of mimicking the actions of older siblings. Lone surviving chicks are often weaned at the youngest possible age as a result of having their parents' full attention and care.

Hand-reared budgies may take slightly longer to wean than parent-raised chicks. Hand feeding is not routinely done with budgerigars, due to their small size and because young parent raised birds can be readily tamed.

=== Diet ===
In the wild and in domestic care, budgerigars have a predominantly seed-based diet based upon their daily energy requirements. They would need a proper balance of carbohydrates, proteins, fat, vitamins, minerals, and water for their survival. Wild budgies eat a variety of seeds, fruits, berries, and vegetation. They would typically feed on or near the ground. What they eat varies with food availability during the different seasons or weather conditions. On the other hand, domesticated budgerigars can develop fatty-liver disease if their diet is only seed-based with no varied fruits or vegetables to help with the necessary nutrients.

== Domestication and relationship with humans ==
According to some sources, budgies are the most popular species of pet birds in the world. In the U.S., budgies started becoming increasingly popular as a pet during the 1950s, at a time when previously canaries had been the most popular bird pet. Today budgies are considered to be the third most popular pet in the U.S. after dogs and cats. Cockatiels have in recent times become as popular as budgies.

=== Aviculture ===
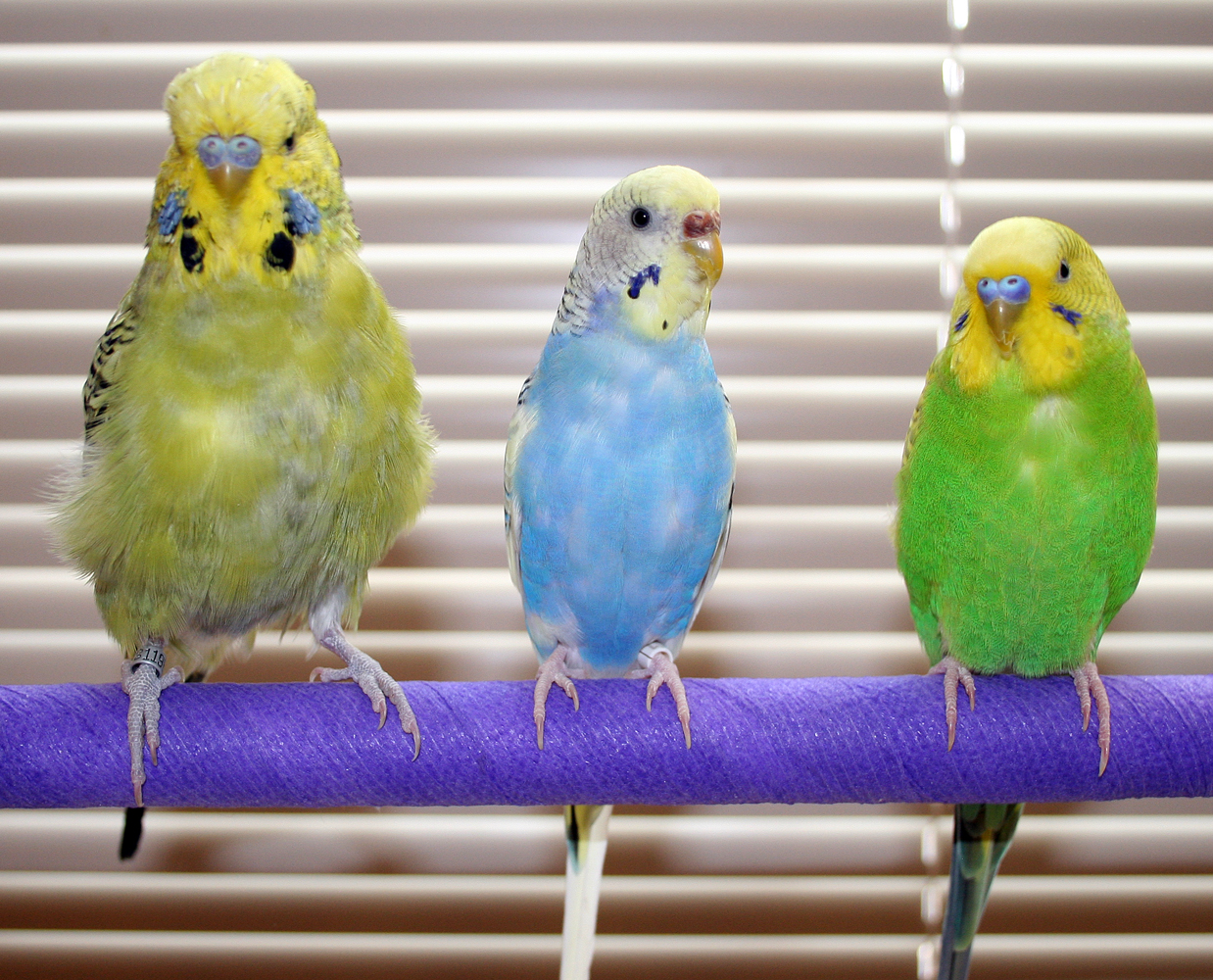
Exhibition style "budgie" (left), as compared to pet-type budgerigars

The budgerigar has been bred in captivity since the 1850s. Breeders have worked to produce a variety of colour, pattern and feather mutations, including albino, blue, cinnamon-ino (lacewing), clearwing, crested, dark, greywing, opaline, pieds, spangled, dilute (suffused) and violet.

"English budgerigars", more correctly called "show" or "exhibition budgerigars", are about twice as large as their wild counterparts and have puffier head feathers, giving them a boldly exaggerated look. The eyes and beak can be almost totally obscured by these fluffy head feathers. English budgerigars are typically more expensive than wild-type birds, and have a shorter life span of about seven to nine years. Breeders of English budgerigars show their birds at animal shows. Most captive budgerigars in the pet trade are more similar in size and body conformation to wild budgerigars.

Budgerigars are social animals and require stimulation in the shape of toys and interaction with humans or with other budgerigars. Budgerigars, and especially females, will chew material such as wood. When a budgerigar feels threatened, it will try to perch as high as possible and to bring its feathers close against its body in order to appear thinner.

Tame budgerigars can be taught to speak, whistle and play with humans. Both males and females sing and can learn to mimic sounds and words and do simple tricks, but singing and mimicry are more pronounced and better perfected in males. Females rarely learn to mimic more than a dozen words. Males can easily acquire vocabularies ranging from a few dozen to a hundred words. Pet males, especially those kept alone, are generally the best speakers.

Budgerigars will chew on anything they can find to keep their beaks trimmed. Mineral blocks (ideally enriched with iodine), cuttlebone and soft wooden pieces are suitable for this activity. Cuttlebones also supply calcium, essential for the proper forming of eggs and bone solidity. In captivity, budgerigars live an average of 7.8 years, but life spans of 15–21 years have been reported. Birds housed in one zoo attained an average lifespan of only 3.6 years, though this was a large population, with mortality from mycobacteriosis and Macrorhabdus ornithogaster being particularly high. The life span depends on breed, lineage, and health, being highly influenced by exercise and diet. Budgerigars have been known to cause "bird fancier's lung" in sensitive people, a type of hypersensitivity pneumonitis. Apart from a handful of illnesses, diseases of the species are not transmittable to humans.

=== Mimicry ===
Budgerigars, like many other species of parrot, are able to mimic human speech. Puck, a male budgerigar owned by American Camille Jordan, holds the world record for the largest vocabulary of any bird, at 1,728 words. Puck died in 1994, with the record first appearing in the 1995 edition of Guinness World Records. The budgerigar "Disco" became Internet famous in 2013. Some of Disco's most repeated phrases included, "I am not a crook" and "Nobody puts baby bird in a corner!".

== In popular culture ==
Small bathing suits for men, commonly referred to as togs or "Speedos", are informally called "budgie smugglers" in Australia. The phrase is humorously based on the appearance of the tight-fitting cloth around the male's genitals looking like a small budgie. The phrase was added to the Oxford English Dictionary in 2016.

== Gallery ==
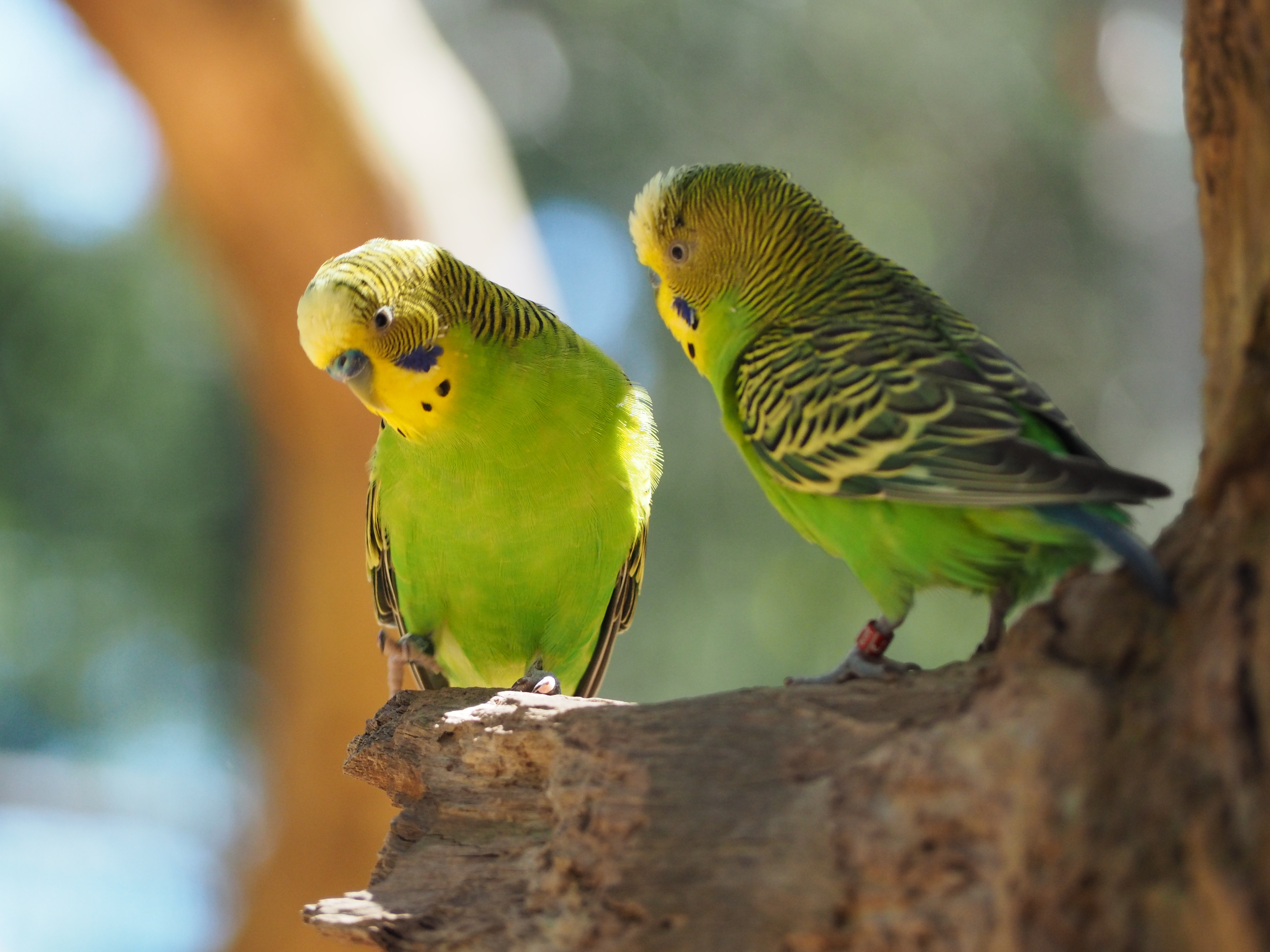
Budgerigars perched in a tree

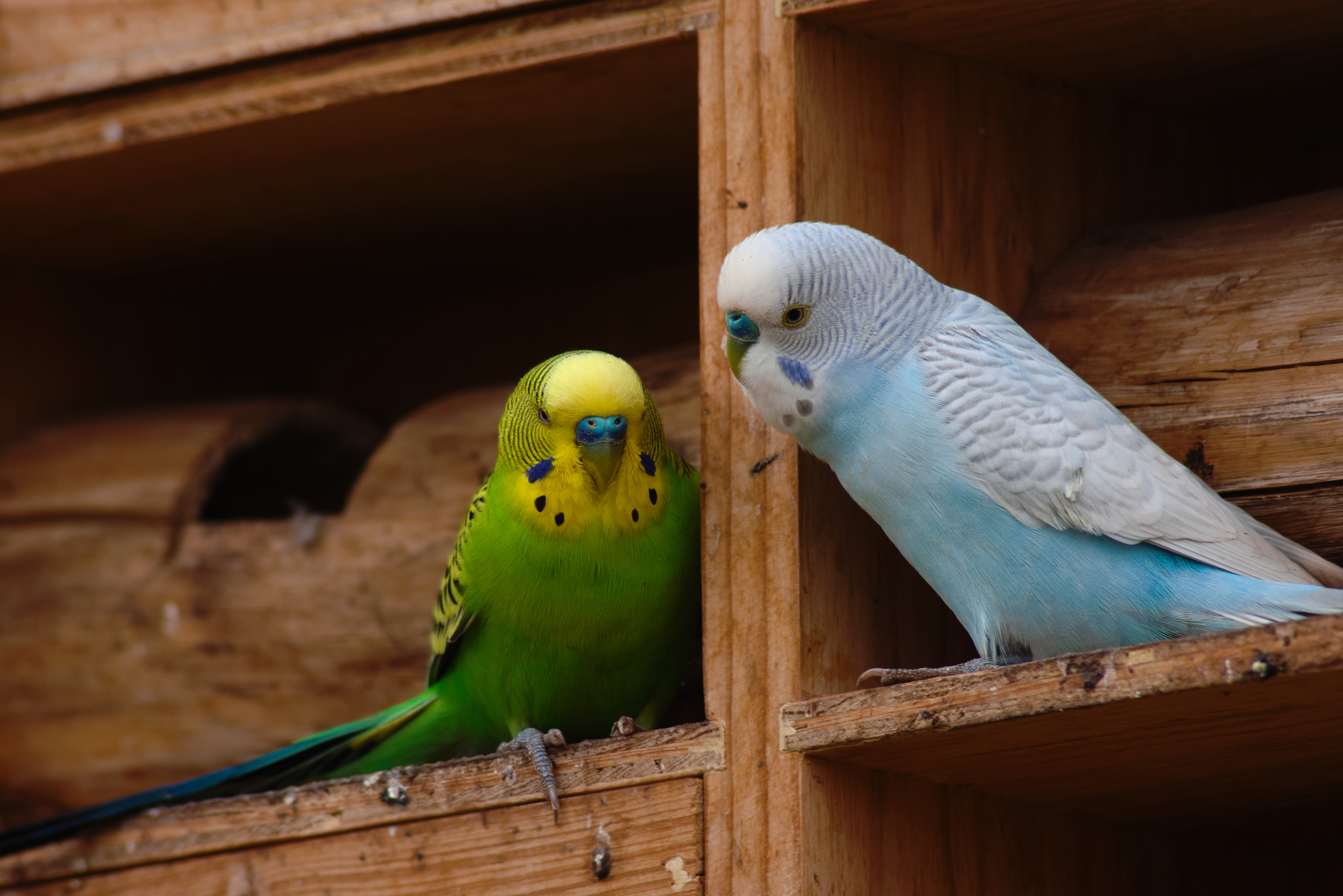
2 Male Budgerigars in Panoaya park, Mexico

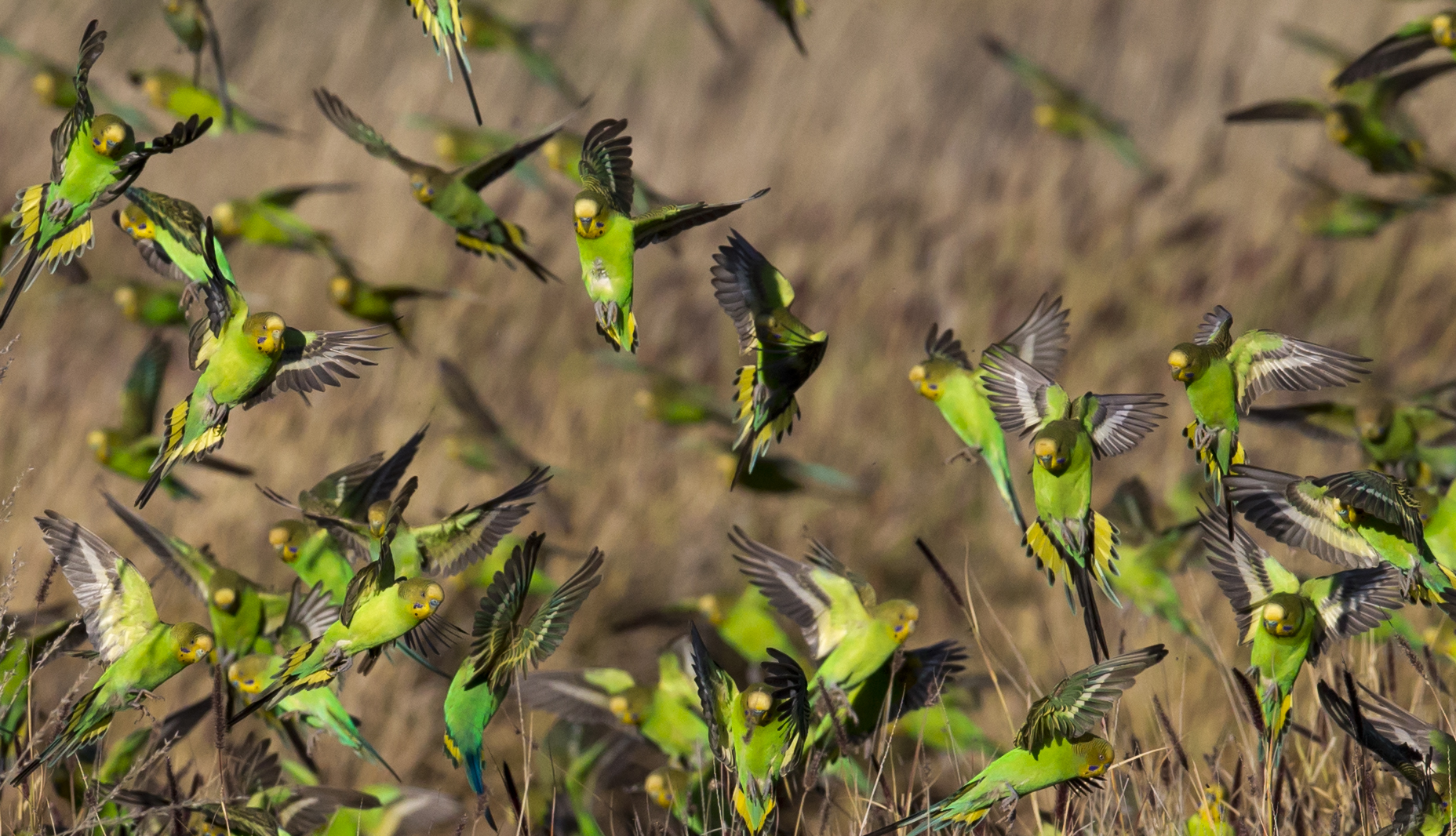
Budgerigar flock up-close

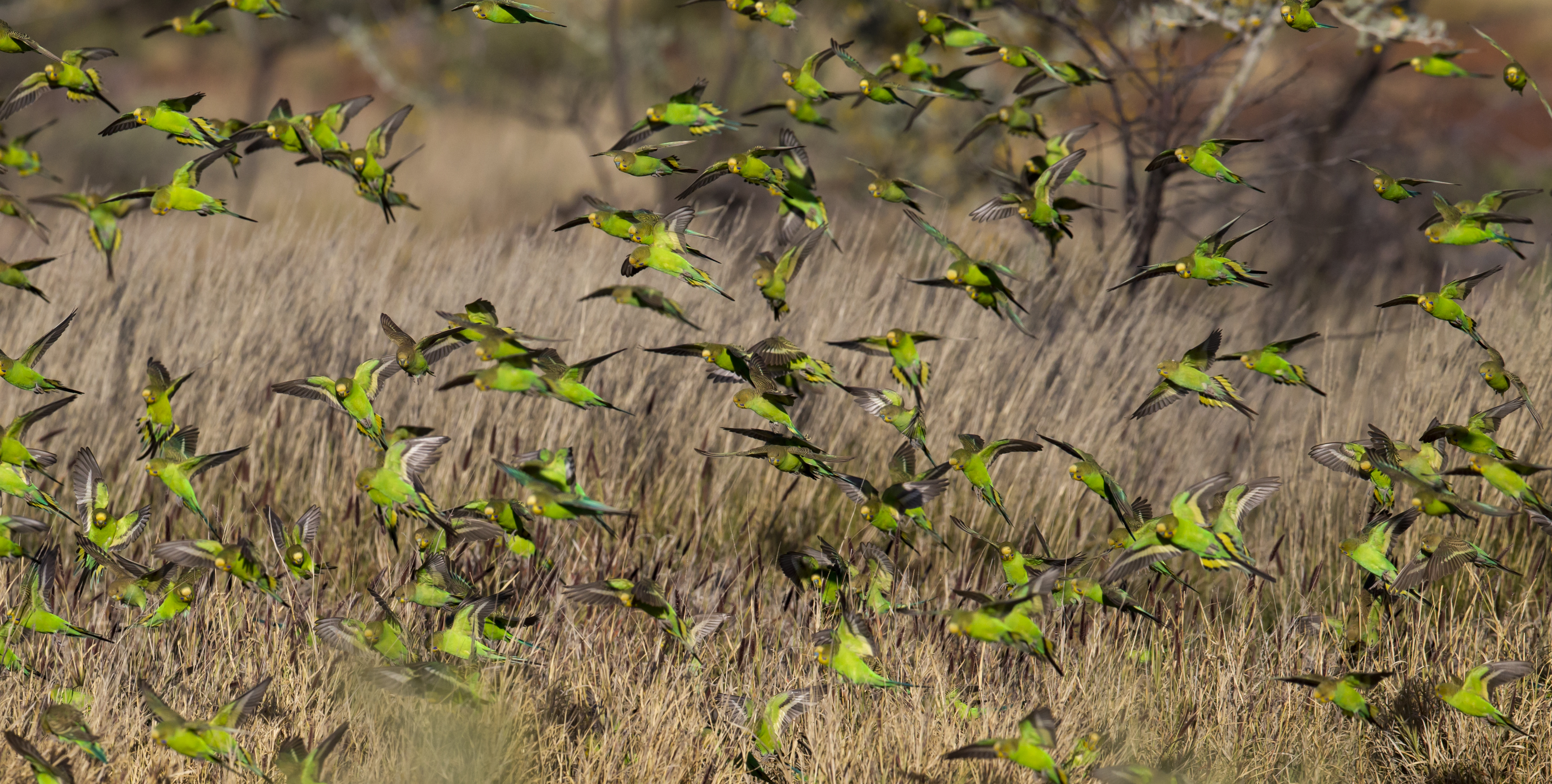
Large flock of budgerigars

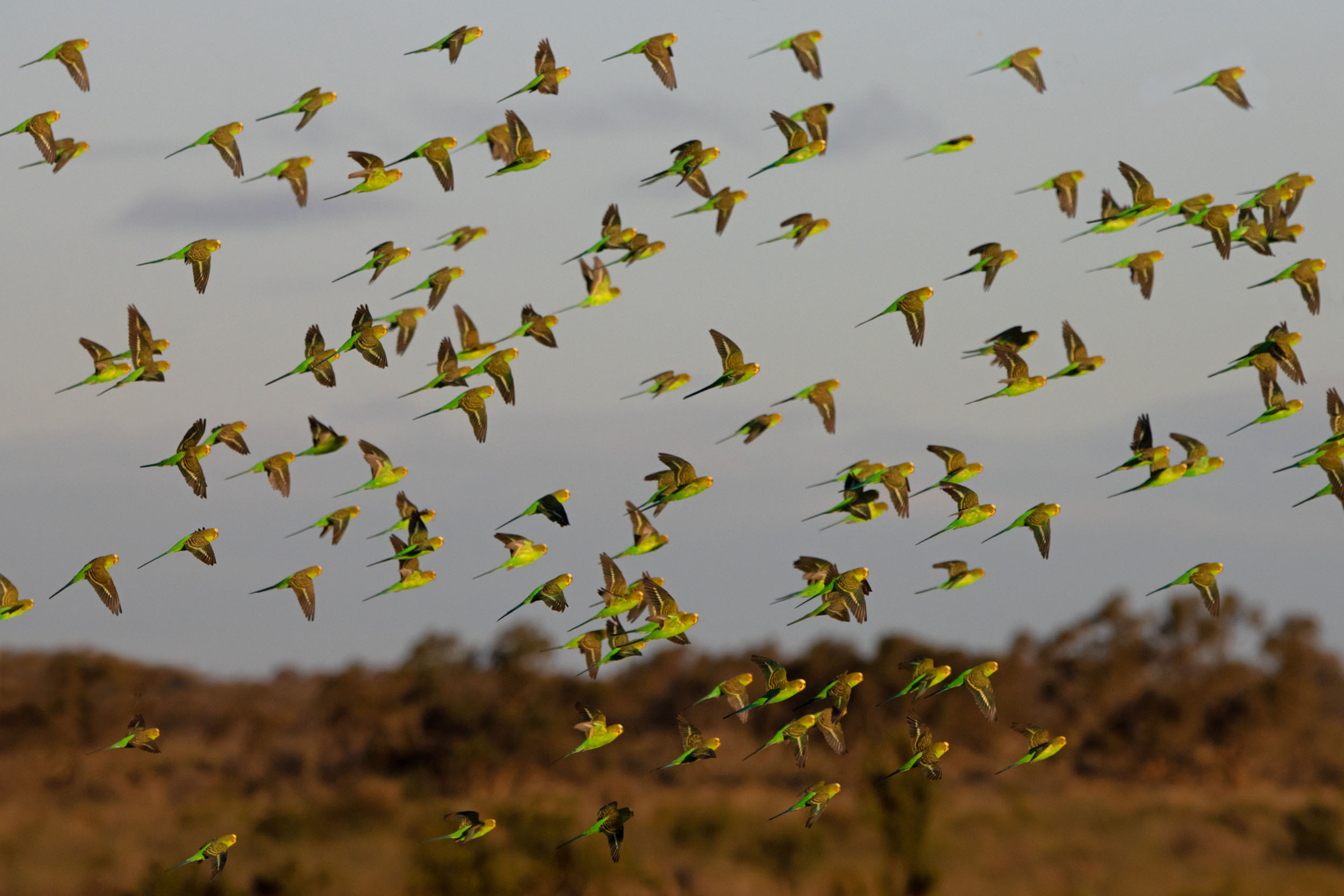
Budgerigars in flocks in their natural habitat

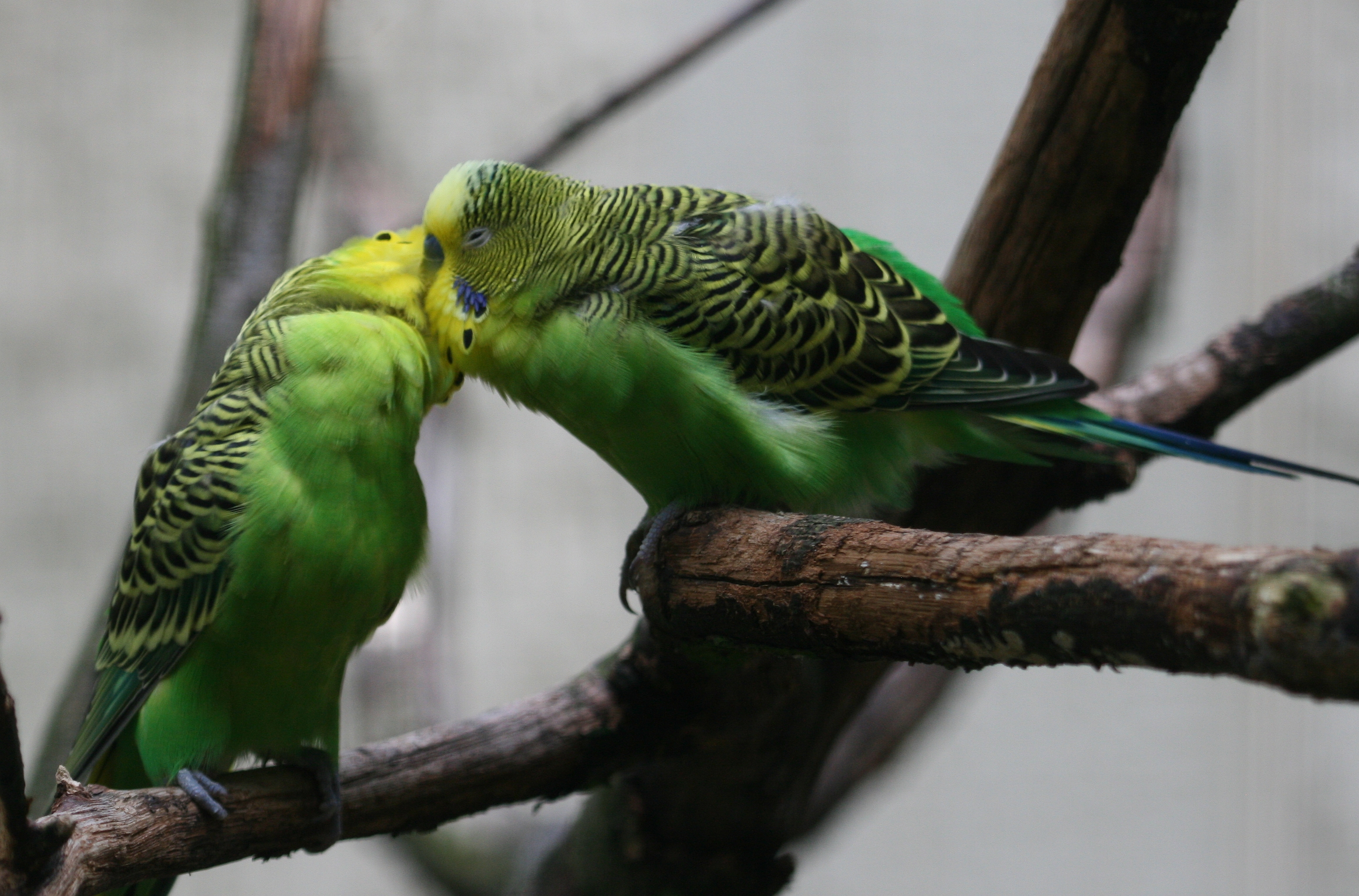
A budgerigar family

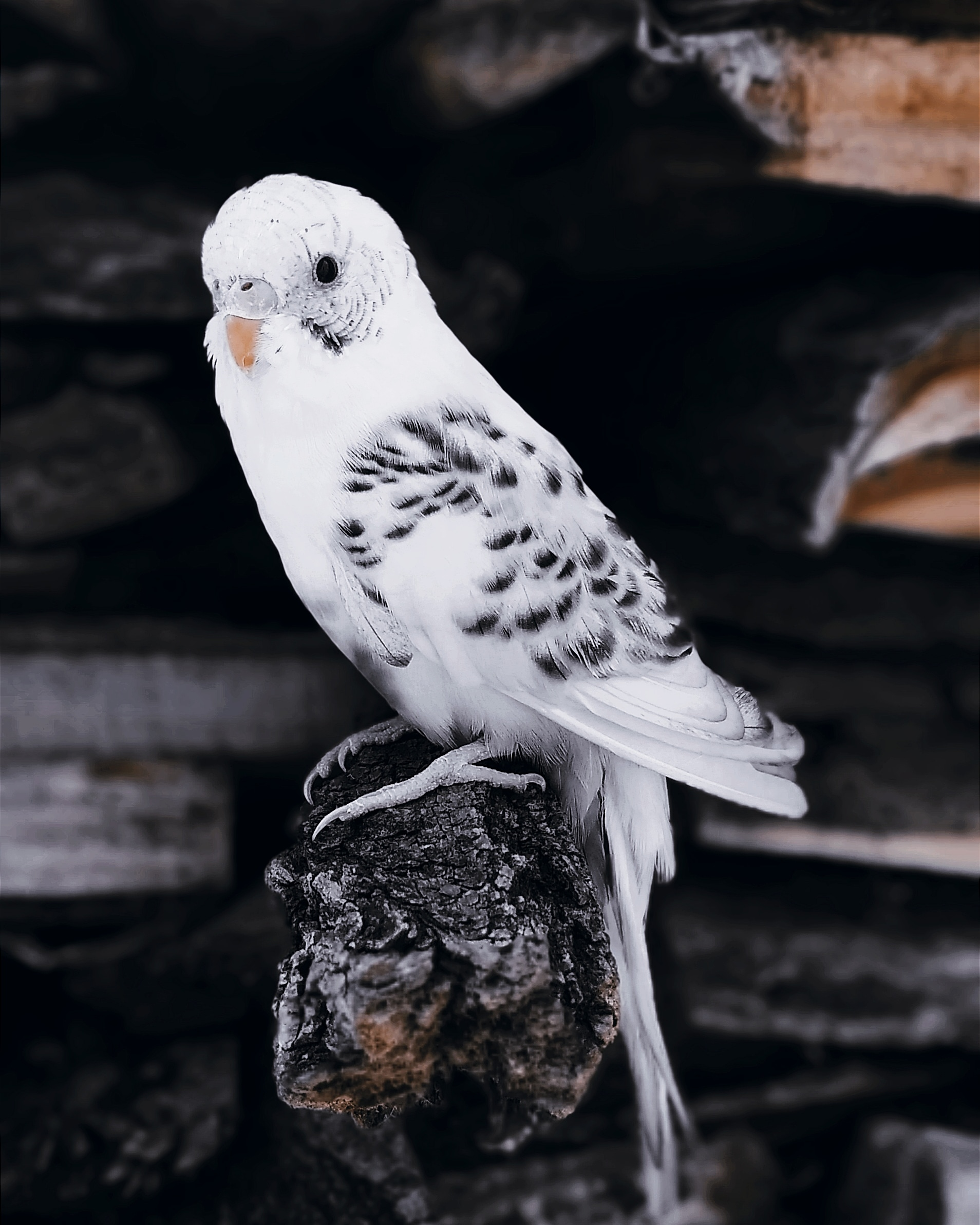
A white budgerigar

Budgerigars interacting in captivity in Japan

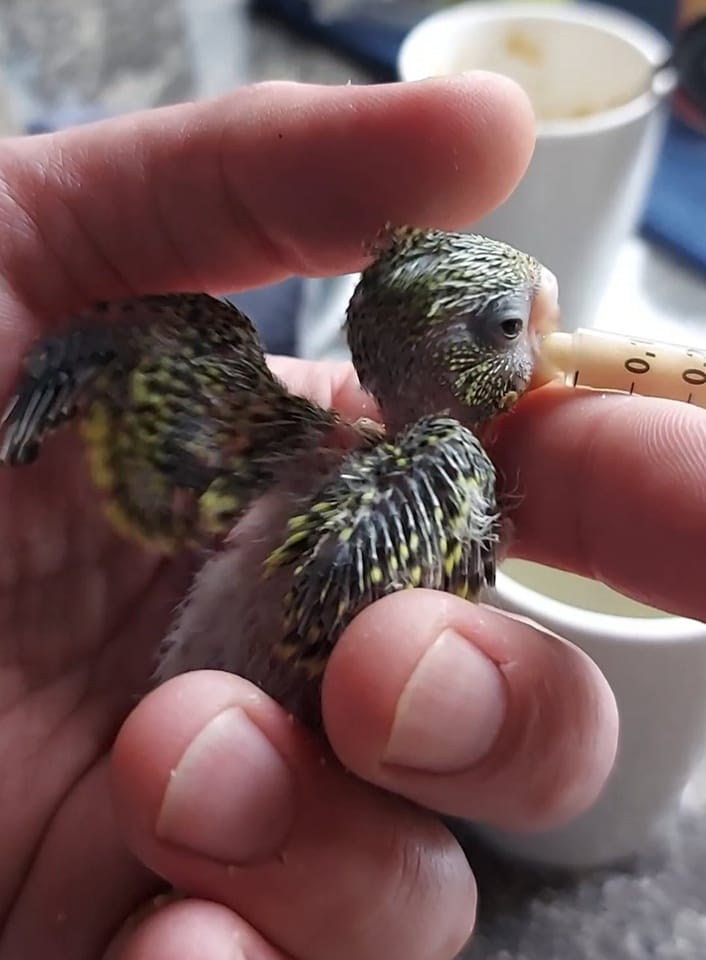
A budgerigar chick being hand-reared after the death of the female

== See also ==
- Budgerigar colour genetics
- Sparkie (budgerigar)
- Talking bird
- Whipper (budgerigar)

== Bibliography ==
- Pranty, B. 2001. The Budgerigar in Florida: Rise and fall of an exotic psittacid. North American Birds 55: 389–397.
- Forshaw, Joseph M. & Cooper, William T. (1978): Parrots of the World (2nd ed). Landsdowne Editions, Melbourne Australia ISBN 0-7018-0690-7
- Collar, N. J. (1997). Budgerigar (Melopsittacus undulatus). Pg. 384 in: del Hoyo, J., Elliott, A. & Sargatal, J. eds. (1997).
  Handbook of the Birds of the World. Vol. 4. Sandgrouse to Cuckoos. Lynx Edicions, Barcelona. ISBN 84-87334-22-9
