= Scottish Fallow budgerigar mutation =

Genetic mutation affecting the colour of budgerigars

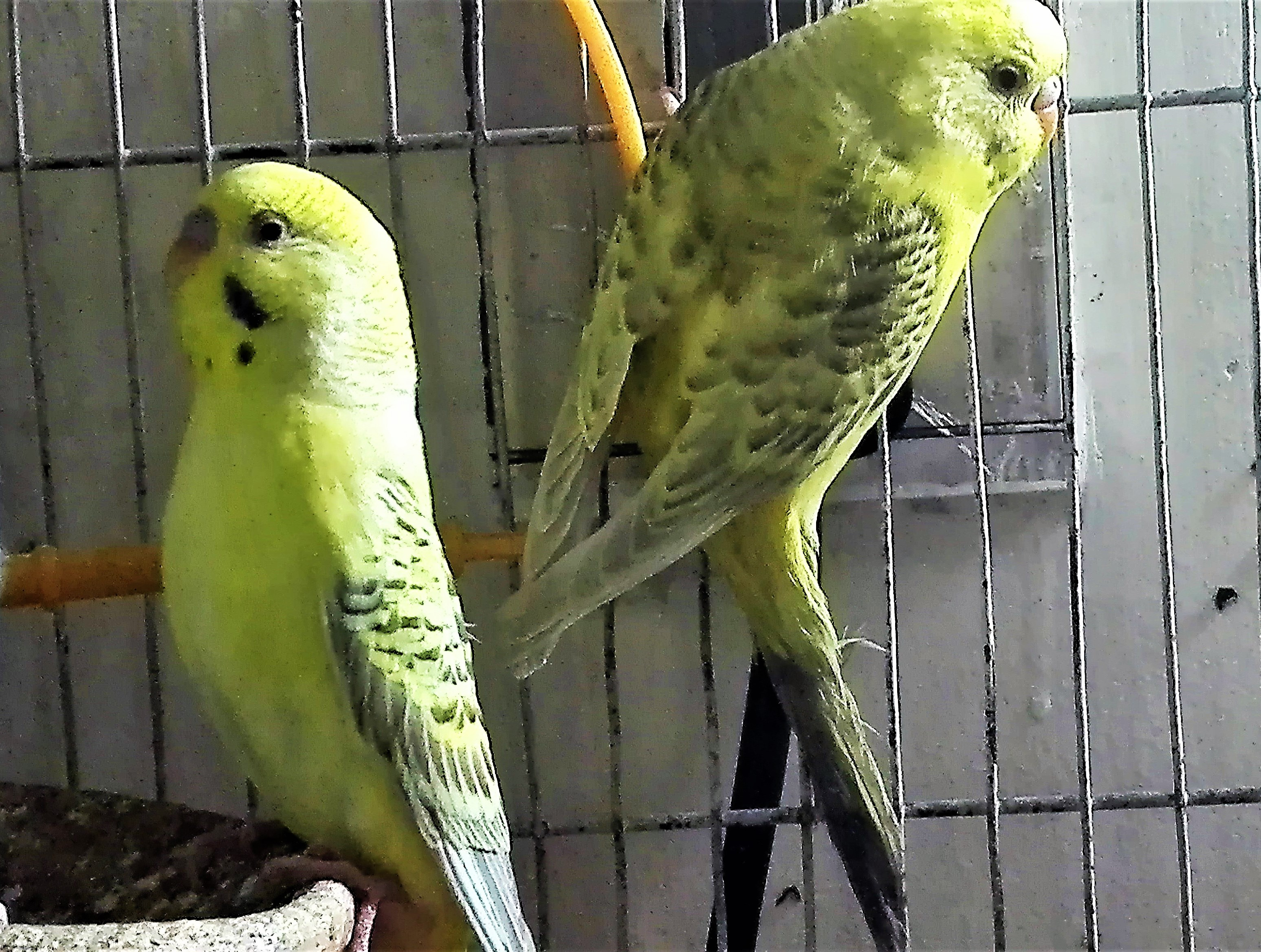
Budgerigars with a Fallow mutation

The Scottish Fallow budgerigar mutation is one of approximately 30 mutations affecting the colour of budgerigars. At least three types of Fallow, the German, English and Scottish, all named after their country of origin, have been established, although none of these types is common. They are superficially similar, but adult birds may be distinguished by examining the eye. All have red eyes, but the German Fallow shows the usual white iris ring, the eye of the English Fallow is a solid red with a barely discernible iris and the iris of the Scottish Fallow is pink.

== Appearance ==
In most respects English, Scottish and German Fallows are very similar. All resemble Cinnamons, but differ in having a much weaker body colour, which results in a rather attractive mustard-yellow breast shading to green on the rump (blue in the blue series). The depth of the green or blue suffusion varies in individual birds, but is always more intense towards the vent and on the rump. The throat spots, head and neck striations, and wing markings are a medium brown on a yellowish ground. The cheek patches are a lighter and duller shade of violet than normal. Cocks have a greyish-purple rather than the usual blue cere. The feet and legs are pink and the beak orange.

The most obvious distinction from Cinnamons is the red eye, which in the Scottish Fallow is a clear bright red rather like an English Fallow but with a pinkish iris ring.

The Dark mutation deepens the body colour of the Fallow, but the difference between the Light Green, Dark Green and Olive Fallow is far less than that between the normal Light Green, Dark Green and Olive. The Olive Fallow is "a beautiful rich golden orange shade, and the chest is deep yellow olive - a truly lovely colouring", says Cyril Rogers in The Fallows.

Fallow Greys and Grey-Greens generally have darker wing markings. Opaline by itself lightens the body colour of Fallows and in combination with Cinnamon produces a bird very similar in appearance to a Lacewing (i.e. a Cinnamon Ino), with virtually no body suffusion.

== Historical notes ==
In the early 1960s C Warner and T G Taylor obtained Fallows from two different sources, both purporting to be English Fallows. They found they bred only black-eyed young when cross-paired. One type had a faint iris ring while the other was completely devoid of iris pigmentation. Both varieties were distinct from the German Fallow, and they concluded that three distinct forms of Fallow existed at that time. The Fallows with the faint iris ring were good quality exhibition birds and became known as "Moffat" or Scottish Fallows after their owner, Jim Moffat, of Saltcoats, Ayrshire, Scotland.

An article by Ian Whiteside in the Scottish Journal summarised by Ghalib Al-Nasser gives the early history of the Scottish Fallow. It says Mr Moffat's father obtained the Fallows in the mid-1920s from Mr Coghill, who was a bank manager in Nairn, Scotland. Mr Moffat's father looked after the birds while he served in the RAF, and when he returned home at the end of the war he decided to concentrate on Fallows. He was very successful with his Fallows on the show-bench, but he found the strain difficult to breed due to a high rate of chick mortality and he eventually disposed of all his Fallows around 1960 to two leading breeders - Bryant and Finey.

Ian Whiteside goes on to say that he himself bred a Fallow in 1986 from a pair of normal Greens. These came from a blood-line which originated from Richie Kerr of Greenock, who was known to be a friend of Mr Moffat Snr, suggesting that this was probably a Scottish Fallow. Further Fallows have been bred more recently by two Scottish fanciers from descendants of these birds, so the variety is not completely extinct.

W P Bland, writing in the Budgerigar Bulletin in 1962, said he "... obtained some English Fallows and by 1939 had sixty". It seems unlikely that these birds were from Mr Dervan's strain of English Fallows if the date is correct. There is evidence that Scottish Fallows existed from the 1920s, and were originally called English Fallows, so it seems likely Mr Bland's were of this variety.

In 1964 John Papin of California wrote that in America no less than five distinct Fallow varieties existed. These were

1. English Fallow, red eye, solid without ring
2. German, red eye with ring
3. Californian, similar to German, red eye with ring
4. Californian, a near solid red eye type with rather fine grey markings
5. Texas, a red eye with strong body colour

He said all were recessive and produce normals if intermated.

The name Fallow was first applied to the German Fallow by Herr Kokemüller after Dr Steiner, who examined some German Fallow feathers microscopically, wrote to him, "It would be better to describe this form as the fallow Budgerigar rather than cinnamon." At the time it was believed that Dr Steiner used the word by analogy with fallow or undeveloped land, to mean the melanin pigment was undeveloped, but as an alternative meaning for 'fallow' (and also for its German equivalent) is 'pale yellow' or 'light brown', it seems far more likely that it was this meaning that was intended. When the English Fallow appeared a few years later it was so similar in appearance to the German Fallow that for a time they were both called Fallows. Later, English, German and Scottish Fallows were proved to be distinct and separate mutations by test matings made independently by T G Taylor, Mrs Amber Lloyd of Walton-on-Thames and Frank Wait, and qualified names were then introduced to distinguish them. It was found that birds of any two of the mutations produced only normal black-eyed young when paired together.

== Genetics ==
The Scottish Fallow is an autosomal mutation causing recessive changes to the form of the melanin pigment. There is no universally accepted genetic symbol for either the locus or mutant allele, so the simple symbol fs^{+} will be adopted here for the wild-type allele at this locus, and the symbol fs for the Scottish Fallow mutant allele, in keeping with the most widely used name in budgerigar circles.

In its visual effect, the Scottish Fallow mutation is recessive to its wild-type allele, so a bird possessing a single Scottish Fallow allele (the heterozygote, fs^{+}/fs) is identical in appearance to the wild-type light green. That is, the presence of a single wild-type allele is sufficient to permit the full production and normal distribution of the black melanin pigment. Among the budgerigar fancy such a bird is said to be a Light Green split Scottish fallow, usually written Light Green/Scottish fallow.

In a bird which has two Scottish Fallow alleles (the homozygote, fs/fs), the lack of the wild-type allele means that normal black melanin pigment cannot be produced. Instead a pigment giving a brown appearance is substituted, resulting in brown markings where black would appear in the Normal.
