= English Fallow budgerigar mutation =

Mutation affecting the color of budgerigars

The English Fallow budgerigar mutation is one of approximately 30 mutations affecting the colour of budgerigars. At least three types of Fallow, the German, English and Scottish, all named after their country of origin, have been established, although none of these types is common. They are superficially similar, but adult birds may be distinguished by examining the eye. All have red eyes, but the German Fallow shows the usual white iris ring, the eye of the English Fallow is a solid red with a barely discernible iris and the iris of the Scottish Fallow is pink.

In an attempt to regularise the names of mutations across all psittacines, it has been proposed by Inte Onsman that the name Pale Fallow be adopted for this mutation. The name Dun Fallow has also been proposed, and Terry Martin suggests Beige Fallow or Grey-Brown Fallow. But in Budgerigar circles the variety is commonly known as the English Fallow, and is the name retained here.

== Appearance ==
In most respects English, Scottish and German Fallows are very similar. All resemble Cinnamons, but differ in having a much weaker body colour, which results in a rather attractive mustard-yellow breast shading to green on the rump (blue in the blue series). The depth of the green or blue suffusion varies in individual birds, but is always more intense towards the vent and on the rump. The throat spots, head and neck striations, and wing markings are a medium brown on a yellowish ground. The cheek patches are a lighter and duller shade of violet than normal. Cocks have a greyish-purple rather than the usual blue cere. The feet and legs are pink and the beak orange.

The most obvious distinction from Cinnamons is the red eye, which in the English Fallow is a clear bright red, without a white iris ring—a beautiful and attractive feature. The eye of the German Fallow is a deep ruby-red, like an Ino's but a shade darker, with the usual white iris ring when adult, and the Scottish Fallow has a pink iris ring. On hatching, young English Fallows have red eyes like Inos but young German Fallow chicks have plum-coloured eyes rather like Cinnamon chicks.

The Dark mutation deepens the body colour of the Fallow, but the difference between the Light Green, Dark Green and Olive Fallow is far less than that between the normal Light Green, Dark Green and Olive. The Olive Fallow is "a beautiful rich golden orange shade, and the chest is deep yellow olive—a truly lovely colouring", says Cyril Rogers in The Fallows.

Fallow Greys and Grey-Greens generally have darker wing markings. Opaline by itself lightens the body colour of Fallows, and in combination with Cinnamon produces a bird very similar in appearance to a Lacewing (i.e. a Cinnamon Ino), with virtually no body suffusion.

== Historical notes ==
The English Fallow first appeared in 1937 in the aviaries of F Dervan, of Luton. He was a beginner to aviculture, starting in 1934 with a pair of Skyblues. He bought a pair of Greens in 1935 and bred from the two pairs. In 1936 and 1937 he intermated the descendants from these two pairs very closely, and was surprised in 1937 when seven red-eyed Fallows appeared in the nests of two of the pairs.

These red-eyed birds were inspected by C H Rogers, who suspected they might be a new variety and advised Mr Dervan to mate one of his Fallows to a German Fallow to check. This pairing was made in 1938, and from three nests eight black-eyed youngsters were bred, proving the varieties were distinct.

In 1940 English Fallows of the Blue series were produced by Mr Dervan, and at that time he had 13 Fallows and 28 split Fallows.

W P Bland, writing in the Budgerigar Bulletin in 1962, said he "... obtained some English Fallows and by 1939 had sixty". It seems unlikely that these birds were from Mr Dervan's strain if the date is correct. There is evidence that Scottish Fallows existed from the 1920s, and were originally called English Fallows, so it seems likely Mr Bland's were of this variety.

In the early 1960s C Warner and T G Taylor obtained English Fallows from two different sources, although allegedly from the same breeder. They found they bred only black-eyed young when cross-paired. One type had a faint iris ring while the other was completely devoid of iris pigmentation. Both varieties were distinct from the German Fallow, and they concluded that three distinct forms of Fallow existed at that time. The Fallows with the faint iris ring were good quality exhibition birds and became known as "Moffat" or Scottish Fallows after their owner, Jim Moffat.

In 1964 John Papin of California wrote that in America no less than five distinct Fallow varieties existed. These were

1. English Fallow, red eye, solid without ring
2. German, red eye with ring
3. Californian, similar to German, red eye with ring
4. Californian, a near solid red eye type with rather fine grey markings
5. Texas, a red eye with strong body colour

He said all were recessive and produce normals if intermated.

The numbers of all varieties of budgerigar in captivity declined dramatically during the war years and when aviculture restarted in earnest in the late 1940s English Fallows were very rare. They were originally quite small and were never very popular with breeders of exhibition birds. In the period from the 1960s to the 1980s they almost died out, but Dr Margaret Young of Rochester, Kent kept the variety alive almost single-handed, and now the variety is gaining steadily in popularity.

The name Fallow was first applied to the German Fallow by Herr Kokemüller after Dr Steiner, who examined some German Fallow feathers microscopically, wrote to him, "It would be better to describe this form as the fallow Budgerigar rather than cinnamon." At the time it was believed that Dr Steiner used the word by analogy with fallow or undeveloped land, to mean the melanin pigment was undeveloped, but as an alternative meaning for 'fallow' (and also for its German equivalent) is 'pale yellow' or 'light brown', it seems far more likely that it was this meaning that was intended. When the English Fallow appeared a few years later it was so similar in appearance to the German Fallow that for a time they were both called Fallows. Later, English, German and Scottish Fallows were proved to be distinct and separate mutations by test matings made independently by T G Taylor, Mrs Amber Lloyd of Walton-on-Thames and Frank Wait, and qualified names were then introduced to distinguish them. It was found that birds of any two of the mutations produced only normal black-eyed young when paired together.

== Genetics ==
The English Fallow is an autosomal mutation causing recessive changes to the form of the melanin pigment. There is no universally accepted genetic symbol for either the locus or mutant allele, so the simple symbol fe^{+} will be adopted here for the wild-type allele at this locus, and the symbol fe for the English Fallow mutant allele, in keeping with the most widely used name in budgerigar circles.

In its visual effect, the English Fallow mutation is recessive to its wild-type allele, so a bird possessing a single English Fallow allele (the heterozygote, fe^{+}/fe) is identical in appearance to the wild-type light green. That is, the presence of a single wild-type allele is sufficient to permit the full production and normal distribution of the black melanin pigment. Among the budgerigar fancy such a bird is said to be a Light Green split English fallow, usually written Light Green/English fallow.

In a bird which has two English Fallow alleles (the homozygote, fe/fe), the lack of the wild-type allele means that normal black melanin pigment cannot be produced. Instead a pigment giving a brown appearance is substituted, resulting in brown markings where black would appear in the Normal.
