= Greywing budgerigar mutation =

Genetic mutation affecting the colour of budgerigars

The Greywing budgerigar mutation is one of approximately 30 mutations affecting the colour of budgerigars. It is the underlying mutation of the Greywing variety. When combined with the Clearwing mutation the variety is known as a Full-bodied Greywing.

== Appearance ==
The body colour of the Greywing variety is about half the intensity of the corresponding normal variety, and the wing, head and neck markings are similarly reduced in intensity from black to mid-grey. The spots are grey and the cheek patches are pale violet. The tail feathers are grey with a bluish tinge. The overall effect is a very pleasing combination of pastel shades, particularly so in the blue series.

In comparison to other varieties, the grey markings on a Greywing are of a similar intensity to the brown markings on a Cinnamon, maybe a little deeper, and considerably deeper than those on any Clearwing or Dilute. The body colour is deeper than most Dilutes, yet much paler than the body colour of Clearwings.

As with Dilutes and Clearwings, there is considerable variation in the depth of body colour and wing markings of Greywings. Greywings at the paler end of the range correspond with the World Budgerigar Organisation's standard of 50% of the intensity of normal colouring, while those at the darker end approach the depth of colour of normals. Greywings which are split for Dilute are often slightly paler than pure Greywings.

When pure-breeding (homozygous) Greywings are paired with pure-breeding Clearwings the resulting offspring, known as Full-bodied Greywings, are quite distinct in appearance from both parents. They have a body colour almost as deep as the corresponding normal variety and with the rich sheen of the Clearwing, but with medium grey markings marginally darker than the parent Greywing. The tail and flight feathers are like the parent Greywing, but the cheek patches are violet, almost as dark as those of the corresponding normal.

== Historical notes ==
The first breeding of a Greywing in captivity could have been as early as 1875, when the director of Breslau Zoo in Kassel, Germany, bred a budgerigar with a description exactly matching the present-day Greywing Light Green. This bird died when six months old, and no further birds of this description were reported for more than forty years.

In 1919 Mrs Ransome or Ranson of Wimbledon, London, sent an example of a variety she was breeding to J W Marsden, which she called Jades. It was later identified as a Greywing green. She bred this from a 'blue-bred green hen' and a 'badly coloured Yellow cock', so either the Yellow cock was a Greywing and the hen split Greywing, or the bird bred was not a Greywing at all but a deeply suffused Yellow.

G F Hedges established a Greywing strain from birds obtained, it is believed, from the Blanchard aviaries in Toulouse, France. His first Greywings appeared in 1920. B Jackson of Bingley in West Yorkshire also obtained Greywings from the same French aviaries in 1923, so it seems likely that Mon A Blanchard was the first to establish the Greywing variety in Europe, although there is an opinion that these might have been Yellows of deep suffusion.

The Greywing variety was gradually established during the 1920s in Germany, France, Great Britain and Australia, although in Australia the appearance of the Clearwing mutation in Greywing stock soon afterwards led to the two mutations intermingling.

In the early 1920s birds of this variety were known variously as Jades, Apple Greens, May Greens or Satinettes in the green series and as Pearls or Silverwings in the blue series. One of the first tasks of the newly established Colour Committee of the British Budgerigar Society was to sort out this confusion of names, and on their recommendation the standard name 'Greywing' was adopted.

By the late 1920s the Greywing had been recognised by the British Budgerigar Society as a standard variety, and most of the top breeders had stocks. A Greywing Blue was exhibited at the Crystal Palace show in 1931 by Mrs Mallam of Redhill, Surrey, and won fourth best in show, and at the same show in the following year Ivor I J Symes gained second place with a team of Greywings bred from a pair he had imported from Germany in 1930.

Greywings continued to increase during the 1930s, but the new mutations appearing around that time, such as the Cinnamon, Opaline, Ino, Grey and Clearwing, began to compete for the attention of breeders. After the war, when stocks were being established again, it was these latter varieties which caught the fanciers' interest, and the Greywing became (and remained) a rare variety bred by only a few specialists. In 1981 it was reported that no one was known to have a substantial stud of Greywings, although at least three breeders had or wanted Greywings.

== Genetics ==
The Greywing is an autosomal mutation of the dil locus with the symbol dil^{gw}, and so is a member of the multiple allelic series which also includes the Dilute (dil^{d}) and Clearwing (dil^{cw}) mutations. The Greywing allele is recessive to the wild-type, dominant over the Dilute allele and co-dominant with the Clearwing allele.

The effect of the Greywing mutation is fully visible only in a bird which is homozygous for the Greywing allele with the genotype dil^{gw}/dil^{gw} or is heterozygous with the Dilute allele, with genotype dil^{gw}/dil^{d}. The effect is to reduce the number of melanin granules in both the cortical and medullary cells of feather barbs over the whole body by around 50%.

When heterozygous with the wild-type allele with the genotype dil^{+}/dil^{gw} the phenotype is identical to the wild-type Light Green and the bird is known as a Greywing/dilute.

When the Clearwing and Greywing alleles are both present the genotype is dil^{cw}/dil^{gw} and the bird is known as a Full-bodied Greywing. Both alleles are partially expressed, giving the bird wings like a Greywing and a body coloured like a Clearwing. A fuller description is given under Appearance above.
