= German Fallow budgerigar mutation =

Genetic mutation affecting the colour of budgerigars

The German Fallow budgerigar mutation is one of approximately 30 mutations affecting the colour of budgerigars. At least three types of Fallow, the German, English, and Scottish, all named after their country of origin, have been established, although none of these types is common. They are superficially similar, but adult birds may be distinguished by examining the eye. All have red eyes, but the German Fallow shows the usual white iris ring, the eye of the English Fallow is a solid red with a barely discernible iris and the iris of the Scottish Fallow is pink.

In an attempt to regularise the names of mutations across all psittacines, it has been proposed by Inte Onsman that the name Bronze Fallow be adopted for this mutation.

== Appearance ==
In most respects German and English Fallows are very similar. Both resemble Cinnamons, but differ in having a much weaker body colour, which results in a rather attractive mustard-yellow breast shading to green on the rump (blue in the blue series). The depth of the green or blue suffusion varies in individual birds, but is always more intense towards the vent and on the rump. The throat spots, head and neck striations, and wing markings are a medium brown on a yellowish ground. The cheek patches are a lighter and duller shade of violet than normal. Cocks have a greyish-purple rather than the usual blue cere. The feet and legs are pink and the beak orange.

The most obvious distinction from Cinnamons is the red eye, which in the German Fallow is a deep ruby-red, like an Ino's but a shade darker, with the usual white iris ring when adult. The English Fallow has an eye of a clear bright red, without a white iris ring—a beautiful and attractive feature. On hatching, young English Fallows have red eyes like Inos but young German Fallow chicks have plum-coloured eyes rather like Cinnamon chicks.

The Dark mutation deepens the body colour of the Fallow, but the difference between the Light Green, Dark Green and Olive Fallow is far less than that between the normal Light Green, Dark Green and Olive. The Olive Fallow is "a beautiful rich golden orange shade, and the chest is deep yellow olive—a truly lovely colouring", says Cyril Rogers in The Fallows.

Fallow Greys and Grey-Greens generally have darker wing markings. Opaline by itself lightens the body colour of Fallows (see), and in combination with Cinnamon produces a bird very similar in appearance to a Lacewing (i.e. a Cinnamon Ino), with virtually no body suffusion.

When the German Fallow mutation is combined with the Cinnamon and Dilute mutations, the resulting Cinnamon Dilute German Fallow is visually very similar to an Ino.

== Historical notes ==
Birds with descriptions matching Fallows appeared independently in several countries around 1930, but strains were not established. The first report of a brownish budgerigar with red eyes seems to be of a bird bred from an Olive x Greywing Green pairing by Mr Augustin of Biel, Switzerland, in 1929. It died without issue. In 1931 similar birds were reported from California, Denmark and Germany. The Danish strain was shown to be the same as the German birds by C af Enehjelm, who inter-bred birds from both sources and found all the young were Fallows with red eyes.

The first strain to become firmly established, and that which probably founded the present-day German Fallow, originated in Magdeburg, Germany, in 1932. The first two mutants were bred from a Cobalt cock and an Olive hen by Herr Schumann in May 1932, and this pair went on that year to produce seven more similar mutants in two further nests, giving a total of nine. In December 1932 two of these birds were passed to C Balser and two to the partnership of Schrapel and Kokemüller, who described the appearance: "The birds are golden yellow with undulation markings and throat spots of a definite brown shade. The rump is olive yellow, the feet are pale pink ... and the eyes are red, but not quite such a light red as in the case of the albino. The beak is yellow, the cere of the cocks is not so decidedly blue as in normal cocks but pale bluish purple." ^{translated in}

The name Fallow was first applied to the variety by Herr Kokemüller after Dr Steiner, who examined some feathers microscopically, wrote to him, "It would be better to describe this form as the fallow Budgerigar rather than cinnamon." At the time it was believed that Dr Steiner used the word by analogy with fallow or undeveloped land, to mean the melanin pigment was undeveloped, but as an alternative meaning for 'fallow' (and also for its German equivalent) is 'pale yellow' or 'light brown', it seems far more likely that it was this meaning that was intended.

German Fallows were imported to Britain by two partnerships, H R Scott and B S Campkin, and W P C Unwin and F G Simpson, around 1933. In 1934 Scott and Campkin had nine German Fallows breeding and were the first to successfully rear chicks in England. Unwin and Simpson, who imported four German Fallows and six splits, bred Fallows earlier in the same year, but the chicks died in infancy.

Fallows with a white iris ring appeared in the aviaries of Mr O'Brian of Newtown, Sydney, also during the early 1930s. Later, it was established that this was the same mutation as the German Fallow.

German, English and Scottish Fallows were proved to be distinct and separate mutations by test matings made independently by T G Taylor, Mrs Amber Lloyd of Walton-on-Thames and Frank Wait. When birds of any two of the mutations were paired together only normal black-eyed young were produced.

== Genetics ==
The German Fallow is an autosomal recessive mutation. It has been suggested that the German Fallow and the Non-sex-linked Ino are mutations of the same gene, a^{+}, and hence they are given symbols a^{bz} and a respectively, but evidence for this allelic series is scanty. In the absence of firm evidence, others prefer to assign the German Fallow mutation to its own locus, fg^{+} in the wild-type, with the symbol fg for the mutant allele.

In its visual effect, the German Fallow mutation is recessive to its wild-type allele, so a bird possessing a single German Fallow allele (the heterozygote) is identical in appearance to the wild-type light green. That is, the presence of a single wild-type allele is sufficient to permit the full production and normal distribution of the black melanin pigment. Among the budgerigar fancy such a bird is said to be a Light Green split German fallow, usually written Light Green/German fallow.

In a bird which has two German Fallow alleles (the homozygote), the lack of the wild-type allele means the normal black melanin pigment cannot be produced. Instead a brown pigment is substituted, resulting in brown markings where black would appear in the Normal. The effect of the mutation on the microscopic structure of the feathers was first examined by Dr H Steiner. He found the changes were quite different from those induced by the Cinnamon mutation. The pigment granules are smaller and more numerous than normal in both the cortex and medulla cells of the feather barbs and are often massed together in "large drops or flakes". The colour is also a more reddish brown-yellow than the pale brown grains of the Cinnamon. These changes cause a reduction in the intensity of the blue colouration, giving paler birds in the blue series and yellower birds in the green series. The pigmented zone is narrower in the breast feathers than the rump feathers, and it is this structural change that causes the variation in intensity of the body suffusion between breast and rump.
