= Sex-linked Clearbody budgerigar mutation =

Genetic mutation affecting the colour of budgerigars

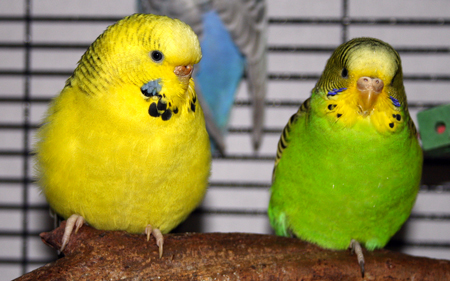
Individual on the left has a yellow-morph Texas Clearbody mutation. Often, individuals with this mutation have white plumage.

The Sex-linked (SL) Clearbody budgerigar mutation is one of approximately 30 mutations affecting the colour of budgerigars. It is the underlying mutation of the Texas Clearbody variety.

Over the years many mutations have been reported which produce a (relatively) clear yellow or white body with normal black or dark wing markings, approximating to the beautiful painting of a (hypothetical) "laced Yellow" by R A Vowles shown in Dr M D S Armour's book, "Exhibition Budgerigars". In an article published in Cage and Aviary Birds Dr T Daniels summarised those that were known in 1981. Many of these failed to become established, and others, reported separately, may have been the same mutation which appeared in different parts of the world. The Sex-linked Clearbody was one which was established successfully in the US.

== Appearance ==
In the green series the Sex-linked (Texas) Clearbody has a yellow body with a pale greenish cast, and white in the blue series with a pale bluish cast. The cast is palest on the breast, increasing towards the vent and rump. The variety has normal wing marking in grey-black, off-white to grey flights, a tail rather lighter than usual, and normal violet cheek patches. The appearance is rather similar to the Dominant (Easley) Clearbody, but the normally coloured cheek patches distinguish the Sex-linked (Texas) Clearbody. For photographs of Sex-linked Clearbodies, see.

== Historical notes ==
The details of the first appearance of the SL (Texas) Clearbody have been lost, but the Clearbodies being bred by Floyd Guelker in 1958 were probably of this type. The original mutation is thought to have originated in a colony aviary in Texas around 1955. In 1958 Gay Terraneo of Wilmington and Mr John Papin of Long Beach, both in California, obtained respectively a pair and a hen, and showed that the mutation is a sex-linked recessive.

Jeff Attwood brought the variety to Britain in 1989.

== Genetics ==
The Sex-linked Clearbody mutation is sex-linked and recessive to wild-type. It is a further mutation of the ino locus with the symbol ino^{cl}. Together with the Ino mutation, it forms a series of multiple alleles. The order of dominance is ino^{+}, ino^{cl}, ino, with ino being the most recessive. Mutations which are allelic to Ino and cause partial albinism are known as Par-ino mutations in parrot species.

Sex	Genotype	Phenotype
Cocks	ino^{+}/ino^{+}	Normal
Cocks	ino^{+}/ino^{cl}	Normal (/SL clearbody)
Cocks	ino^{cl}/ino^{cl}	SL Clearbody
Cocks	ino^{+}/ino	Normal (/ino)
Cocks	ino^{cl}/ino	SL Clearbody (/ino)
Cocks	ino/ino	Ino
Hens	ino^{+}/Y	Normal
Hens	ino^{cl}/Y	SL Clearbody
Hens	ino/Y	Ino

The sex determination system used in birds is the ZW system. In this system, cock birds have two Z chromosomes, and hens have one Z and one W. So in hens whichever allele is present on the single Z chromosome is fully expressed in the phenotype. Hens cannot be split for Sex-linked Clearbody (or any other sex-linked mutation). In cocks, because Sex-linked Clearbody is recessive to wild-type and dominant to Ino, the Sex-linked Clearbody allele must be present on both Z chromosomes (homozygous) or present on one with an Ino allele on the other to be expressed in the phenotype.

Cocks which are heterozygous for Sex-linked Clearbody with the wild-type allele are identical to the corresponding Normal. Such birds are said to be split for Sex-linked Clearbody, usually written '/SL Clearbody' or '/Texas Clearbody'.

Cocks which are heterozygous for Sex-linked Clearbody with the Ino allele are visually similar to homozygous Clearbodies, although possibly with clearer bodies. Such birds are said to be split for Ino, usually written 'SL Clearbody/ino' or 'Texas Clearbody/ino'.

The table on the right shows the appearance of all possible genetic combinations involving the Sex-linked Clearbody and the Ino mutations.

As the ino locus is on the Z-chromosome the Sex-linked Clearbody gene is linked to all other sex-linked mutations, including Opaline, Slate, and Cinnamon. Because Sex-linked Clearbody is an allele of Ino, the cross-over values between Sex-linked Clearbody and other sex-linked mutations are identical to those between Ino and those mutations. For these cross-over values, see the Genetics section in the Ino budgerigar mutation article.
