= Lacewing (disambiguation) =

Lacewing is a common name applied to some species in the insect order Neuroptera.

Lacewing may also refer to:

- Lacewing, a variety of budgerigar, Melopsittacus undulatus, produced in aviculture by crossing Cinnamons with Inos
- Cethosia, a genus of butterflies
