= Sire (disambiguation) =

Sire is a form of address for reigning kings in the United Kingdom and in Belgium.

Sire may also refer to:

- Father, particularly in animal breeding, especially a horse
- James W. Sire (1933–2018), author on worldviews
- Sire Gaines (born 2006), American football player
- Sire (novel), a 1991 novel by Jean Raspail
- Sire Records, a record label
- Sire, Arsi, a town in southeastern Ethiopia
- Sire, Welega, a town in southwestern Ethiopia
- Sire (woreda), a district in Oromia Region, Ethiopia
- Sire, in the table-top RPG Vampire: The Masquerade, the vampiric creator of another vampire

== See also ==
- Albio Sires, American politician
- Dave Sires, American politician
- Sires' Produce Stakes (disambiguation), the name of several different horse races
