= Opaline (disambiguation) =

Opaline may refer to:

- Opaline, a group of protists
- Opaline, an album by Dishwalla
- Opaline glass, decorative French glass
- Opaline silica: an amorphous or cryptocrystalline form of hydrated silica SiO_{2}·nH_{2}O (Opal)
- Opaline, a colour mutation of the budgerigar, Melopsittacus undulatus
