= Slate budgerigar mutation =

Genetic mutation affecting the colour of budgerigars

An adult budgerigar with the skyblue slate mutation

The Slate budgerigar mutation is one of approximately 30 mutations affecting the colour of budgerigars. It is the underlying mutation of the Slate variety.

== Appearance ==
The name 'Slate' is derived from the appearance of blue-series Slates, particularly the Skyblue Slate, which is close in colour to a Light Grey but with a more bluish tone.

The Light Green Slate is intermediate in shade between a Light Green and a Light Grey-Green. In both blue- and green-series Slates the cheek patch is purplish-grey or deep violet, somewhat like the cheek patches of Mauves. The long tail feathers are a little darker than the corresponding non-Slate. Other features are unaffected by this mutation.

The Dark mutation produces a more noticeable effect in combination with Slate than it does with Grey, but these darker Slate shades differ from one another very much less than Skyblue, Cobalt and Mauve differ. The Cobalt Slate and Mauve Slate are distinctly darker than the Skyblue Slate, with the Mauve Slate being very dark. When Violet is also introduced the resulting Violet Mauve Slate is said to be extremely dark, of a dense blue-black colour.

== Historical notes ==
Only one discovery of the Slate mutation appears to be documented in the budgerigar literature. In 1935 T S Bowman of Carlisle bred a Skyblue Slate and a Cobalt Slate, both hens, from a Cobalt cock and a Skyblue hen. As the Slate mutation is a sex-linked recessive, presumably the cock was split for Slate. In a series of articles published in the Budgerigar Bulletin, Mr Bowman described the establishment of the Slate mutation. After breeding a few Slates of the blue series, he deliberately paired a Cobalt split Slate cock to a Light Yellow hen to produce Slates of the green series, and in 1937 he succeeded in breeding both Light Green Slates and a Dark Green Slate.

In 1938 Mr Bowman paired a Slate to a Cinnamon, producing split Cinnamon Slate Type II cocks, and in 1939 he intended breeding from these to produce Cinnamon Slates, but no results appear to have been reported. It was, however, reported that Cinnamon Slates had been bred in 1939 by both W G Roderick of Purley and Len Trevallion of Loughton in Essex. Mr Roderick paired a Light Green split dilute cinnamon slate cock to a Cinnamon Cobalt split dilute hen and they produced a Cinnamon Dilute Slate in the first round. Trevallion paired a Skyblue split cinnamon slate cock to a Dilute Mauve hen and they produced a Cinnamon Slate Cobalt split dilute hen. These Slates are likely to have been obtained from Mr Bowman, as he reported that several other breeders had Slates.

Little was heard of Slates during and immediately after the war, but a few appeared again in the early 1950s, most or maybe all of which were Opaline Slates. It seems to have been quite difficult to separate the Opaline and Slate genes and it was not until 1962 that A F Fullilove reported that non-Opaline Slates had finally been obtained.

After that, Slates almost vanished entirely, but in 1970, after a visit to Cyril Rogers, a Dutch couple obtained a pair of Slates, and later the only Slate they had left was passed to Inte Onsman. Then, in 1992, Inte Onsman sent two Slates cocks to Cyril Rogers. Mr Rogers died in August 1993 and his Slates were passed to Ken Gray, a member of the Rare Variety and Colour BS. Several members of that society then instigated a breeding programme designed to ensure the survival of the Slate variety.

There has always been an interest in producing a completely black budgerigar, so far without success, and the darkening effect of the Slate mutation prompted attempts to combine this mutation with other darkening agents to achieve this. W H James, of Flixton, near Manchester, was one of the first to cross-breed Violets and Slates, attempting it first in 1955, and Cyril Rogers also investigated the effect of combining several darkening mutations in one bird in the late 1950s and early 1960s. These attempts certainly produced dark budgerigars, but because the pale grey to white colour of the barbules of the body feathers is unaffected by any mutation known to date, the admixture of their colour with the colour of the underlying barbs would still produce a grey appearance, even if the barbs themselves were jet black.

== Genetics ==
The Slate mutation is sex-linked, the locus of its gene being carried on the X chromosome. It is recessive to wild-type. The gene locus has the symbol sl. The wild-type allele at this locus is notated sl^{+} and the Slate allele is notated sl.

Sex	Genotype	Phenotype
Cocks	sl^{+}/sl^{+}	Normal
Cocks	sl^{+}/sl	Normal (/slate)
Cocks	sl/sl	Slate
Hens	sl^{+}/Y	Normal
Hens	sl/Y	Slate

In birds, the cock has two X chromosomes and the hen has one X and one Y chromosome. So in hens whichever allele is present on the single X chromosome is fully expressed in the phenotype. Hens cannot be split for Slate (or any other sex-linked mutation). In cocks, because Slate is recessive, the Slate allele must be present on both X chromosomes (homozygous) to be expressed in the phenotype. Cocks which are heterozygous for Slate are identical to the corresponding Normal. Such birds are said to be split for Slate, usually written '/slate'.

The table on the right shows the appearance of all possible genetic combinations involving just the Slate mutation.

The Slate gene is linked to other genes located on the X chromosome, i.e. to the genes of other sex-linked mutations. These sex-linked mutations include the Cinnamon, Ino and Opaline mutations. The cross-over or recombination values between Slate and these linked genes have not all been measured, but the opinion has been expressed that there is a close link between Opaline and Slate. As several Cinnamon Slates were bred without difficulty, it seems likely that the linkage between Cinnamon and Slate is not close. However, these opinions are not borne out by the only measurements to date. In these, Inte Onsman found 22 crossovers between Opaline and Slate in 54 hens bred, which gives a cross-over value of 41±9%, almost no linkage at all. He provides no figures, but suggests the linkage between Cinnamon and Slate is around 5%.
