= Cinnamon budgerigar mutation =

Mutation affecting the colour of budgerigars

The Cinnamon Budgerigar Mutation is one of approximately 30 mutations affecting the colour of budgerigars. It is the underlying mutation of the Cinnamon variety and, with Ino, a constituent mutation of the Lacewing variety.

== Appearance ==
All the markings which appear black or dark grey in the corresponding Normal appear brown in the Cinnamon, of a shade similar to that of white coffee. The Cinnamon markings on cocks tend to be considerably darker than on hens. The long tail feathers are lighter than Normals. The body colour and cheek patches are much paler, being about half the depth of colour of the Normal. The feathers of Cinnamons appear tighter than Normals, giving a silky appearance. It is these quiet pastel shades and the sleekness of the plumage that gives the variety its appeal.

The eyes of the newly hatched Cinnamon are not black like the eyes of Normals, but deep plum-coloured. This colour can be seen through the skin before the eyes open, and immediately after opening a reddish-brown gleam can be seen. A few days later the eye darkens and is then barely distinguishable from that of a Normal chick, but by this time the difference in down colour is visible: Normal chicks have grey down, but Cinnamon (and Opaline and Ino) chicks have white.

The skin of Cinnamon chicks is also redder than Normal's, and this persists into adulthood: the feet of Cinnamons are always pink rather than bluey-grey. The beak tends to be more orange in colour.

Superficially, the Cinnamon is very like the two types of Fallow, the German Fallow and the English Fallow, but the eye of the Cinnamon is dark brown with white iris (except for the first few days after hatching, when it is purplish or plum-coloured) whereas the eyes of both varieties of Fallow are red at all ages. The body colour of the Cinnamon is also a rather deeper shade of green or blue than that of the Fallows.

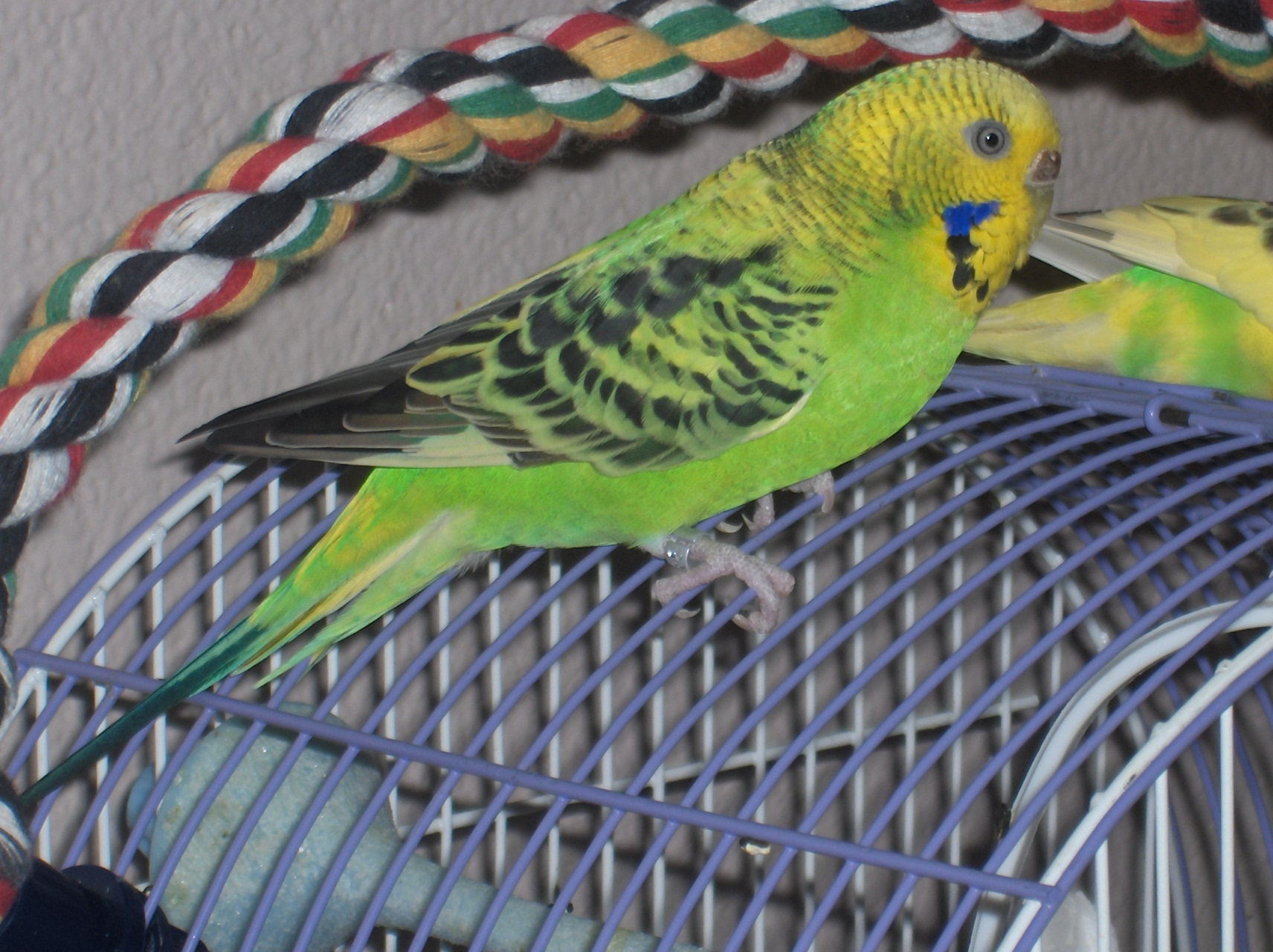
Opaline Light Green hen

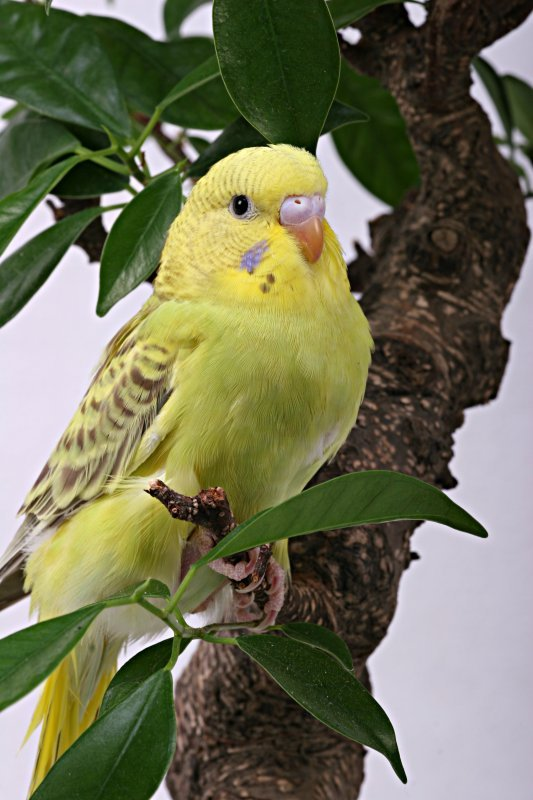
Cinnamon Opaline Light Green cock

== Historical notes ==
Cinnamon specimens of many species have been observed in the wild. A stuffed Cinnamon Light Green budgerigar hen owned by Mrs Ellis of Cottenham, Cambridgeshire, in 1935 and said then to be at least 50 years old was thought by Cyril Rogers to be wild-caught when he examined it.

The first Cinnamon to be reported in Britain was a Cinnamon White Blue hen bred in 1931 from a pair of Light Green split blues by Miss M E J Hughes and her brother Mr G N Hughes of Hampton Hill, Middlesex. This bird was exhibited in 1931 and 1932, although not described as a Cinnamon as that name had not then been adopted. The mutant hen and its sire died without further issue. I J J Symes gave a description of what he called "the brown factor" in this bird, saying the wing markings varied from raw umber to burnt sienna.

A D Simms, of Potter's Bar, also in Middlesex at the time, paired together several Dark Green split greywing siblings in 1931 bred from an Olive cock and a Greywing Light Green hen. Among other, eight Greywing Greens, all hens, were bred which showed a "rather peculiar colour in their nest feathers". These hens were probably Cinnamons or Greywing Cinnamons, but as the Cinnamon variety was not known at the time they were regarded as slightly strange Greywings.

G F Porter of Codicote, near Hitchin, in Hertfordshire, obtained a pair of Dark Green split greywings from Simms, and he too bred what he called Greywing Green hens. One of these he paired to a Cobalt split dilute cock and this pairing produced, among other progeny, a Cobalt cock which was later found to be split for Cinnamon and Dilute. This cock, paired to a Dark Yellow split blue hen, bred a Cinnamon Skyblue hen in early 1933. Other pairings of descendants from Simms' Dark Green split greywings produced a Cinnamon Olive and a Cinnamon Cobalt for Porter, also in 1933. Towards the end on 1933 M Porter bred a Dark Green Cinnamon cock—the first Cinnamon cock to appear in Britain.

A Collier of Luton also bred two Cinnamon hens in 1933, a Mauve and an Olive, but as these were both from stock obtained from Porter, these were almost certainly the same mutation. Collier was the first to report the characteristic plum-coloured eyes of the very young Cinnamon chick, perhaps being prompted to look for this as it was already a known characteristic of the Cinnamon Canary.

Further Cinnamons appeared in 1933 in the aviaries of G Hepburn of Peterhead, Aberdeenshire. These Cinnamons were bred from a pair of Light Greens obtained from a dealer in Aberdeen, but the ring on the cock showed it came from a Mr Banham, who lived near Victoria Station in London. Hepburn attempted to trace the origin of his birds but was unable to establish a firm link to Simms' birds. Nevertheless, all three Cinnamon mutations, those of Messrs Hughes, Simms and Hepburn, originated within a circle of 15 miles radius and within two years of each other. This strongly suggests the importation of a single Cinnamon carrier cock into the Middlesex area around 1930.

S E Terrill reported that the first Australian Cinnamon appeared about August, 1931, near Adelaide. In 1934 Terrill said he had "four or five cock Cinnamons of two, probably three, generations and about 36 Cinnamon hens of at least three generations." Schumacher, of Magdeburg, Germany, also bred budgerigars with brown wings in 1932, but he disposed of them the year after and it is not known if these were Cinnamons.

Towards the end of 1934 the Budgerigar Society recognised the Cinnamon variety for exhibition purposes and published its show standard.

== Genetics ==
The Cinnamon mutation is sex-linked, the locus of its gene being carried on the Z chromosome, and recessive to wild-type. This was determined first by Cyril H Rogers working with Simms and Porter. It was reported in the Budgerigar Bulletin as early as August 1933, and in more detail in September 1934. At the time of the first report a Cinnamon cock had never been bred. The first cock appeared late in 1933 as a result of a deliberate mating by Porter of a Cinnamon hen and a split Cinnamon cock.

Cinnamon-like mutations are known in many other bird species, including the canary, greenfinch, peach-faced lovebird and cockatiel. All these Cinnamon mutations are sex-linked recessives.

The gene locus has the symbol cin. The wild-type allele at this locus is notated cin^{+} and the Cinnamon allele is notated cin.

Sex	Genotype	Phenotype
Cocks	cin^{+}/cin^{+}	Normal
Cocks	cin^{+}/cin	Normal (/cinnamon)
Cocks	cin/cin	Cinnamon
Hens	cin^{+}/Y	Normal
Hens	cin/Y	Cinnamon

In birds, the cock has two Z chromosomes and the hen has one Z and one W chromosome. So in hens whichever allele is present on the single Z chromosome is fully expressed in the phenotype. Hens cannot be split for Cinnamon (or any other sex-linked mutation). In cocks, because Cinnamon is recessive, the Cinnamon allele must be present on both Z chromosomes (homozygous) to be expressed in the phenotype. Cocks which are heterozygous for Cinnamon are identical to the corresponding Normal. Such birds are said to be split for Cinnamon, usually written '/cinnamon'.

The adjacent table shows the appearance of all possible genetic combinations involving the Cinnamon mutation.

The Cinnamon gene is linked to other genes located on the X chromosome, i.e. to the genes of other sex-linked mutations. These sex-linked mutations include the Opaline, Ino and Slate mutations. The cross-over or recombination values between Cinnamon and these linked genes has not been measured accurately, but results collected by C Warner and T Daniels found 41 crossovers in 113 between Cinnamon and Opaline, giving a recombination ratio of 36±6%. The Ino gene is known to be very close to the Cinnamon gene; for details see the Ino budgerigar mutation.

C H Rogers, reporting early breeding results in 1939, notes the breeding of Cinnamon Slates by G W Roderick, of Purley and L Trevallion of Loughton, Essex. The appearance of two Cinnamon Slates by 1939 suggests these two genes are not closely linked.

Cocks split for both Cinnamon and Opaline have one Cinnamon allele and one Opaline allele together with one each of the corresponding wild-type alleles. The linkage between the Cinnamon and Opaline genes gives rise to two types of split cinnamon opaline cocks, both visually identical.

- Type I split cinnamon opalines cocks are bred by mating Cinnamon Opalines to Normals and have the two mutant alleles on the same chromatid, symbolised as cin^{+}-op^{+}/cin-op. Geneticists call this 'coupling' rather than 'Type I'. Because of the linkage, the Cinnamon and Opaline alleles from Type I cocks tend to be inherited together in their progeny. When mated to Normal hens, Type I cocks produce predominantly Cinnamon Opaline and Normal hens, with Cinnamon and Opaline hens resulting rarely from a cross-over. Roughly one third of the hens will be Cinnamon-Opaline, one third Normal, one sixth Cinnamon and one sixth Opaline.
- Type II split cinnamon opaline cocks are bred by mating Cinnamons to Opalines and have the Cinnamon and Opaline mutant alleles on opposite chromatids, symbolised as cin^{+}-op/cin-op^{+}. Geneticists call this 'repulsion' rather than 'Type II'. Because of the separation, the Cinnamon and Opaline alleles from Type II birds tend to be inherited separately in their progeny. When mated to Normal hens, Type II cocks produce predominantly Cinnamon and Opaline hens, with Cinnamon Opaline and Normal hens resulting rarely from cross-overs. Roughly one third of the hens will be Cinnamon, one third Opaline, one sixth Cinnamon Opaline and one sixth Normal.

Hens cannot be split for any sex-linked gene, so only cocks exist in Type I and Type II form.
