= Sire, Arsi =

Town located in Oromia state of Ethiopia

Sire, Arsi Siree, Arsii (Oromo)
- Town
- Location within Ethiopia
- Coordinates: 08°17′N 39°27′E
- Country: Ethiopia
- Region: (Oromia Region) Oromia
- Zone: Arsi Zone
- Time zone: UTC+3 (EAT)

Sire (also transliterated "Sirie") is a town in south-western Oromia. Located in the Arsi Zone of the Oromia, Ethiopia. This town has a latitude and longitude of 08°17′N 39°27′E with an altitude of 1793 meters above sea level. It is administrative center of Sire woreda (Aanaa Siree in Oromo language). Currently Sire District or Aanaa Siree is divided in to seventeen rural administrative communes or Kebele peasant Associations (in Oromo, Araddaa Waldaya Qotebultoota ) and one urban town administration. The rural community or Araddaa in Sire District are the following: Alelu Gasala (Aleelu Gasalaa), Amola Tebbo (Amoolaa Xabboo), Amola Chancho (Amoolaa Caancoo), Borera Chireo (Booraraa Cira'oo), Dankicha Gafarsa (Dhanqicha Gafarsaa), Gasala Amuta (Gasala Amuxaa), Gasala Chacha (Gasala Caaccaa), Gasala Shashe (Gasala Shaashee), Huduga Borano (Huduga Booranoo), Ibseta Huduga (Ibsataa Hudugaa) Koloba Hawas (Kolooba Hawaas), Koloba Bikka (Kolooba Biiqqaa), Koloba Balie (Kolooba Balee), Koloba Shamida (Kolooba Shaamidaa), Lodie Banban (Loodee Banban), Lodie Lammffo (Loodee Lammaffoo) and Ufura Hagamsa (Ufuraa Hagamsaa), The urban Araddaa administration is Sire 01 Araddaa.

C.W. Gwynn passed through Sire in late October 1908 en route to his assignment to delineate the border between Kenya and Ethiopia. He describes the settlement's location at the time as "halfway up the scarp" on the southern side of the Awash River, and Sire itself as "a small Abyssinian village and customs post". He was struck by its "curious little church consisting of a stone-built cube, surmounted by a sharp steeple-like roof, also of stone", which he speculated was originally a Muslim shrine "similar to that at Sheikh Hussein and others in the Arussi country."

Based on figures from the Central Statistical Agency in 2005, Sire has an estimated total population of 10,977 of whom 5,404 are men and 5,573 women. The 1994 census reported this town had a total population of 6,141 of whom 2,931 were men and 3,210 women.

== History ==
Sire in Oromo Language means bed. It seems acquired its name after its geographic location at the top of a hill. Sire was one of the twelve Woredas or districts within the now defunct Chilalo County (Cilaaloo Awrajja) during the times of Emperor Haylasillasie and Provisional Military Administration Governments of Ethiopia. Sire town was also named as Felege Birhan, in Amharic, during the time of Haylasillasie regime and this name was served as official name of the town until 1991 when EPRDF controlled the town. The name Felege Birhan was intended to replace the traditional Oromo name of the place with Amharic name or words. Felege Birhan means the trace of light in Amharic. Currently Felege Birhan is the name of one of towns found in East Gojjam of Amhara Region. When Derge regime was declared Ethiopia as People's Democratic Republic in 1987, Sire town lost its status as the administrative capital of Sire District or Woreda. The Sire district itself was included in to the defunct Qalata (Qalaxaa) Awrajjaa administrative sub division. Sire was also one of the places where various Arsi clans of Oromo people were resisting the Showa Amhara domination in the 1880s. After fierce battles with the local people the Shewan invading army finally conquered the place and established a garrison. The Arsi clans who loosely organized under clan leaders like Lenjiso Diga although were fighting hard, against the Shewan fighters, they were finally defeated because of the superiority of Shewans who were armed with European rifles. Although, various clans of Oromo people were residing in the Sire area according to the legend of the Arsi clan of Oromo people Sire is traditionally belonged to the Gasala sub sub Clan of Jidda within the broader Arsi clan. In addition to Gasala other sub clans were mixed and live together with Gasala sub clan includes Koloba, Jawwi, Sabiro, Ogoddu, Amigna, Lode, Mazaza, Abrogne, Dayida, Hasansaba.
