= Sires' Produce Stakes =

Sires' Produce Stakes may refer to:

- Sires' Produce Stakes (ATC), a registered Australian Turf Club Group 1 horse race run at Randwick Racecourse, Sydney, Australia in April. Currently the race is run as the Inglis Sires'.
- Sires' Produce Stakes (BRC), is a Brisbane Racing Club Group 2 horse race run at Doomben Racecourse, Brisbane, Australia in late May or early June.
- Sires' Produce Stakes (SAJC), is a South Australian Jockey Club Group 3 horse race run at Morphettville Racecourse, Adelaide, Australia in April.
- Sires' Produce Stakes (VRC), is a Victoria Racing Club Group 2 horse race run at Flemington Racecourse, Melbourne, Australia during the VRC Autumn Carnival in March.
- Sires' Produce Stakes (WA), is a Perth Racing Group 3 horse race run at Ascot Racecourse, Perth, Australia in April.
- Manawatu Sires Produce Stakes, is a Manawatu Racing Club Group 1 horse race run at Awapuni Racecourse, Palmerston North, New Zealand in late March or early April.
