= Clearwing budgerigar mutation =

Bird color variation

The Clearwing budgerigar mutation is one of approximately 30 mutations affecting the colour of budgerigars. It is the underlying mutation of the Clearwing variety, often known as Yellowwings in the green series and Whitewings in the blue series. When combined with the Greywing mutation the variety is known as the Full-bodied Greywing. When combined with the Yellowface II and Opaline mutations the Rainbow variety is produced.

== Appearance ==
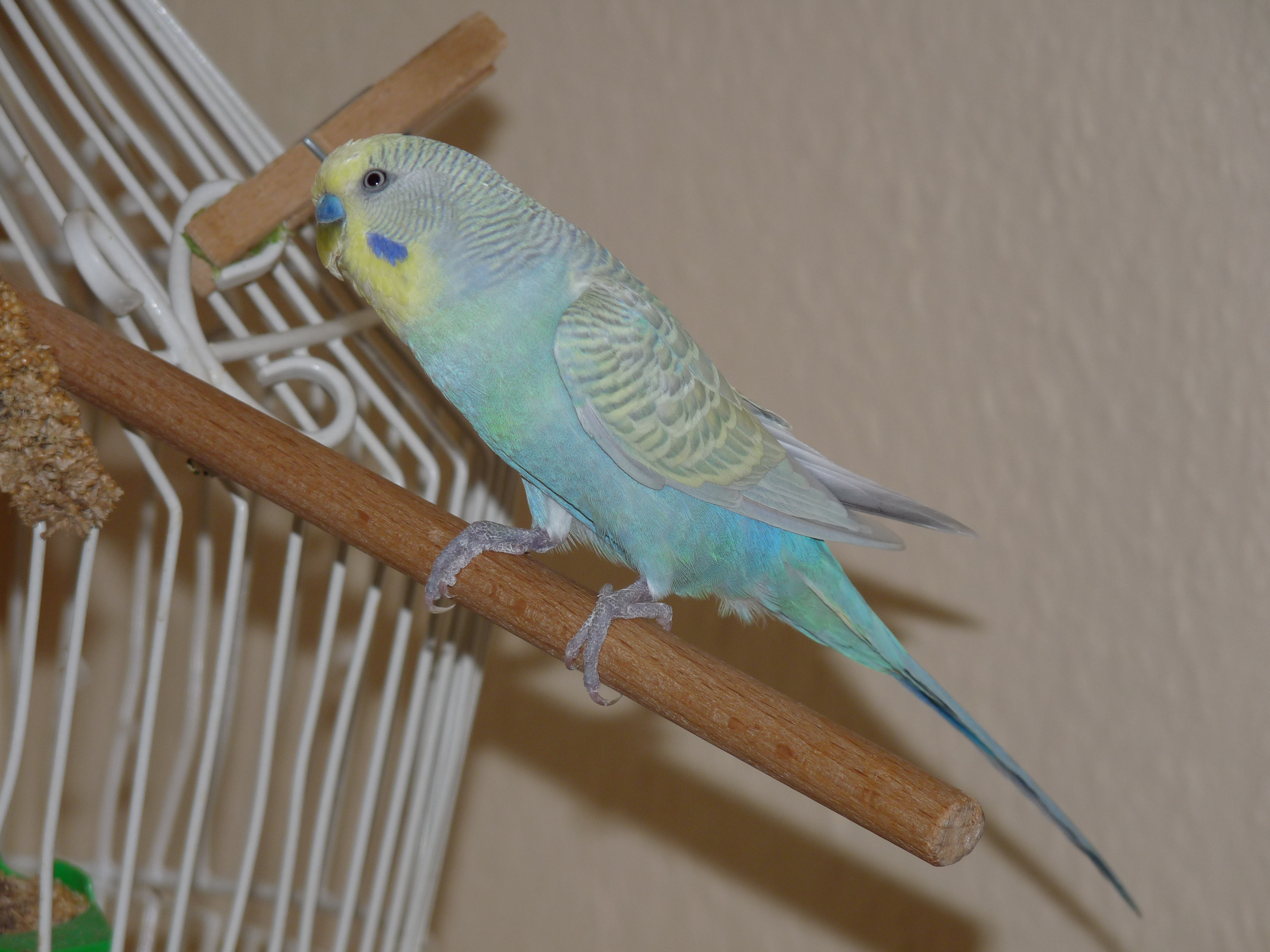
Full Body Greywing, Sky Blue Single Factor Violet, Yellowface Type II Budgie

The Clearwing Light Green has green body feathers only very slightly paler than the normal or wild-type Light Green with highly contrasting yellow wings. The Clearwing Skyblue is similar but with a blue body and white wings. The body colour is a little brighter in tone than the corresponding normal.

The wings and mask carry pale grey shadows of the normal markings and spots. In the best show birds these are quite faint, but nevertheless are still clearly visible. The cheek flash, cere and eye are unaffected by this mutation. The long tail feathers are much paler than the wild-type, being smokey-grey in the blue series and a pale grey-green in the green series. Clearwings which are split for Dilute are often slightly paler than pure Clearwings.

== Historical notes ==
The precise origin of the Clearwing mutation is unclear, but Clearwings almost certainly appeared first among Greywing stock in Australia in the late 1920s.

In the 1920s the Greywing was quite a popular variety, far more common than now. Many studs of Greywings were established in both Great Britain and Australia, but there seemed to be differences between the British Greywings and those being bred in Australia. The British variety had soft grey markings and a body colour of about half the normal intensity, whereas some of the Australian 'Greywings' had a body colour of almost normal intensity, together with very pale wing markings. These brighter coloured 'Greywings' were very popular in Australia and were preferred to the more subdued shades of the true Greywing.

In the mid-1930s there was considerable debate about the nature of these brighter Australian 'Greywings', some maintaining that they were a distinct mutation and others insisting that they were obtained by selective breeding from normal Greywings and/or Dilutes.

The 'Greywings' with almost full body colour and light wing markings were known throughout Australia as Jades in the green series and Royals in the blue series. The latter name originated from a pair of 'Greywing' Cobalts (of the type with intense body colour) which were presented to HM King George V in, it is believed, 1935. These birds came from a strain which had been cultivated by Harold E Pier of Peakhurst, New South Wales, over the previous seven years. More generally these birds were called Australs, and significantly, Yellowwings and Whitewings. They were, in fact, almost certainly the breed we now know as Clearwings or crosses between the Clearwing and Greywing mutations which we now know as Full-Bodied Greywings.

The correct identification and classification of the two quite distinct Greywing and Clearwing mutations was clearly understood by some Australian breeders by 1936, and probably considerably earlier, but the first article to appear in Britain which clearly set out the genetic behaviour of the two mutations was written by R B Browne of Hornsby, New South Wales and published in the Budgerigar Bulletin in June 1937. It was endorsed by Prof F A E Crew in the same issue. In it Mr Browne described the two mutations, Greywing and Clearwing, correctly identified the full body-coloured Greywing as simply a bird bred by crossing a Greywing and Clearwing together, and gave detailed and exact information regarding their genetic relationship.

So, with hindsight, we can see that the Clearwing mutation was being bred in Australia at least as early as 1926, but was not generally recognised as a separate mutation until the mid-1930s due to confusion with the well established Greywings.

Breeders in Britain were unable to contribute much to the Greywing-Clearwing debate, as Clearwings were unknown here until August 1936, when Mr E Walker of Sydney brought over the first Clearwings for Messrs Mott and Marshall, believed to be of Birmingham, and in the same year Mr R J Watts was given a pair by Mr Ernest W Jones, the chairman of the Budgerigar Club of New South Wales.

== Genetics ==
The Clearwing mutation is one of the few that affect different areas of the body selectively. Like many budgerigar mutations, it is the black melanin pigment that is affected. This pigment is present in the medulla or inner cells of the barbs of all the feathers which appear green (or blue in the white series), and in the cortex or outer cells of the barbs of all the feathers which appear black. The Clearwing mutation causes a large reduction in the number of pigment granules in the cortex, but only a very small reduction in the number of pigment granules in the medulla.

Because the black markings in the budgerigar are due mainly to melanin pigment in the cortex it is these areas that are most affected by the Clearwing mutation, while the intensity of the blue colouration, which is dependent on pigmentation in the medulla, is affected very little.

So the Clearwing mutation exerts a selective effect, not on the wing feathers per se, but on cortical pigmentation. In this respect it is the opposite of the several Clearbody budgerigar mutations, which seem to selectively suppress medullary pigmentation while leaving cortical pigmentation unaffected.

The Clearwing is an autosomal mutation of the dil locus given the symbol dil^{cw}, and so is a member of the multiple allelic series which also includes the Dilute (dil^{d}) and Greywing (dil^{gw}) mutations. The Clearwing allele is recessive to the wild-type, dominant to the Dilute allele and co-dominant with the Greywing allele.

The effect of the Clearwing mutation is fully visible only in a bird which is homozygous for the Clearwing allele with the genotype dil^{cw}/dil^{cw} or is heterozygous with the Dilute allele, with genotype dil^{cw}/dil^{d}. When heterozygous with the wild-type allele with the genotype dil^{+}/dil^{cw} the phenotype is identical to the wild-type Light Green and the bird is known as a split Clearwing.

When the Clearwing and Greywing alleles are both present the genotype is dil^{cw}/dil^{gw} and the bird is known as a Full-bodied Greywing. Both alleles are partially expressed, giving the bird wings like a Greywing and a body colour like a Clearwing. A more detailed description is given under the Greywing mutation.
