= Sire (Aanaa) =

District located in Central Oromia regional state of Ethiopia

Sire Siree (Oromo)
- District
- Location within Ethiopia
- Country: Ethiopia
- Region: (Oromia Region) Oromia
- Zone: Arsi Zone
- Time zone: UTC+3 (EAT)

Sire is one of the Aanaas in the Oromia Regional State of Ethiopia. It is part of the Arsi Zone and the former Dodotana Sire woreda. The administrative center of the woreda is Sire.

== Demographics ==
The 2007 national census reported a total population for this woreda of 73,970, of whom 37,812 were men and 36,158 were women; 8,376 or 11.32% of its population were urban dwellers. The majority of the inhabitants said they practiced Ethiopian Orthodox Christianity, with 51.61% of the population reporting they observed this belief, while 44.46% of the population were Muslim, and 3.76% of the population were Protestant.
