= Ino budgerigar mutation =

Genetic mutation affecting the colour of budgerigars

The Ino budgerigar mutation is one of approximately 30 mutations affecting the colour of budgerigars. It is the underlying mutation of the Albino and Lutino varieties and, with Cinnamon, a constituent mutation of the Lacewing variety.

== Appearance ==
In the green series the Ino is known as the Lutino, with pure yellow contour feathers, white or pale yellow flight feathers and tail feathers and silvery-white cheek patches. In some lights the body can show a very pale green sheen.

In the blue series the Ino is known as the Albino, and is pure white throughout. The cheek patches are almost the same colour as the body, but slightly more silvery. In some lights the body can show a very pale blue sheen.

Variety	Pantone colour
Lutino	102

The eyes of both the Lutino and Albino are red at all ages with white irides when adult, the beak is orange and the feet and legs are pink. The cere of an adult Ino cock is greyish-purple rather than blue.

The World Budgerigar Organisation has established precise standards for certain budgerigar body colours using Pantone colour numbers, as shown in the table.

The Ino mutation also induces changes in the nestling. The down is white rather than grey and appears only sparsely, never growing down the centre of the back. As the feathers appear, those down the spine and along the ventral centre line are late to develop.

The Ino gene masks the effect of virtually all other mutations, including Opaline, Dark, Dominant Grey, Dilute, and Clearwing. These genes, when present in an Ino in either heterozygous or homozygous form, cause no change in the appearance of the Ino. But the Ino gene does not entirely mask Cinnamon. A Cinnamon Ino, usually called a Lacewing, has pale brown or fawn spots, tail and wing markings. These markings are quite clear, but considerably fainter than the markings of a normal Cinnamon.

The Dark-eyed Clear has a similar body colour to the Ino, but has solid reddish-purple eyes without a white iris.

Cinnamon Dilute German Fallows, NSL Inos and Inos are all very similar and difficult to distinguish from each other, but the first two are so uncommon difficulties arise rarely in practice.

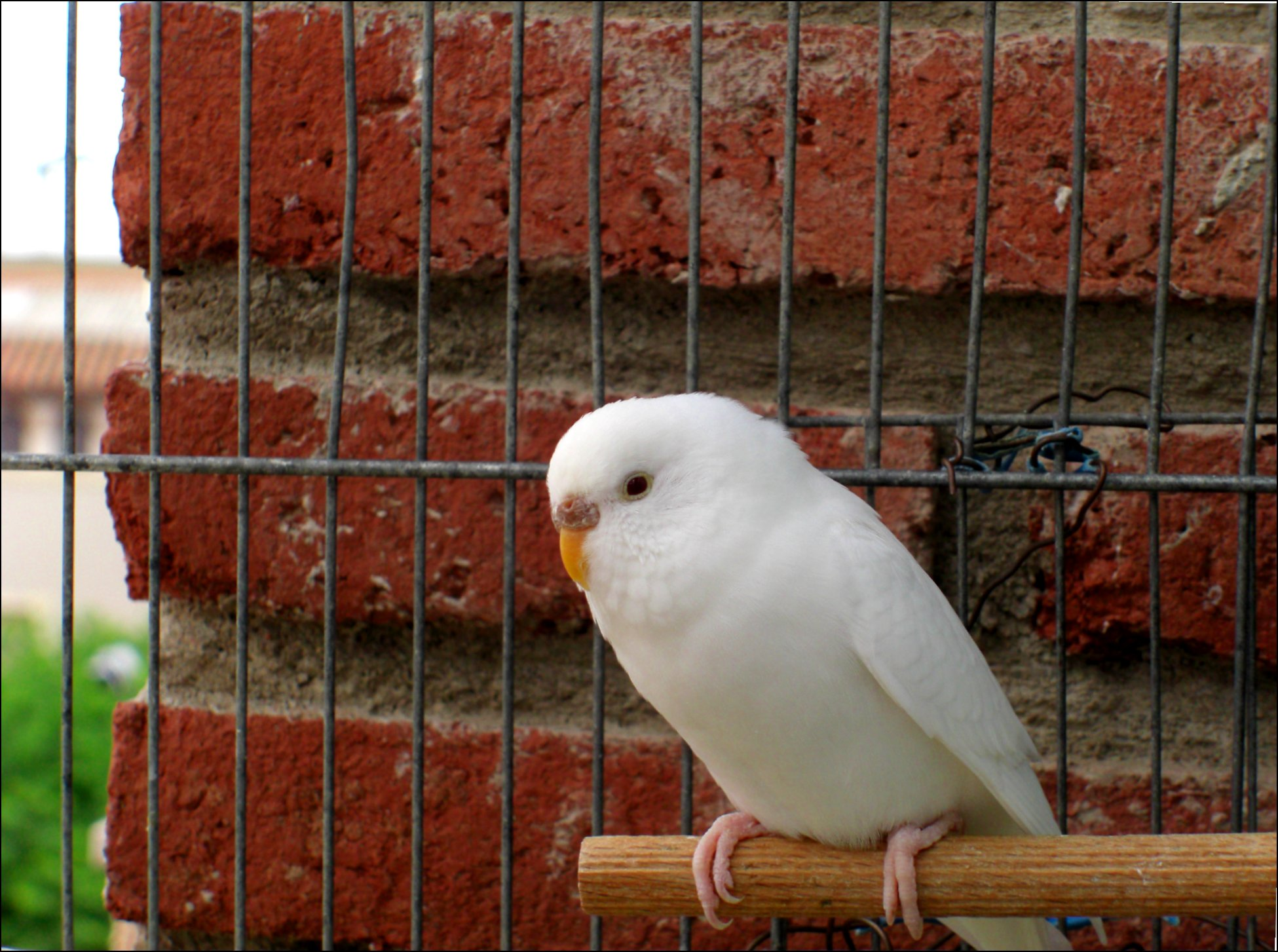
Albino hen

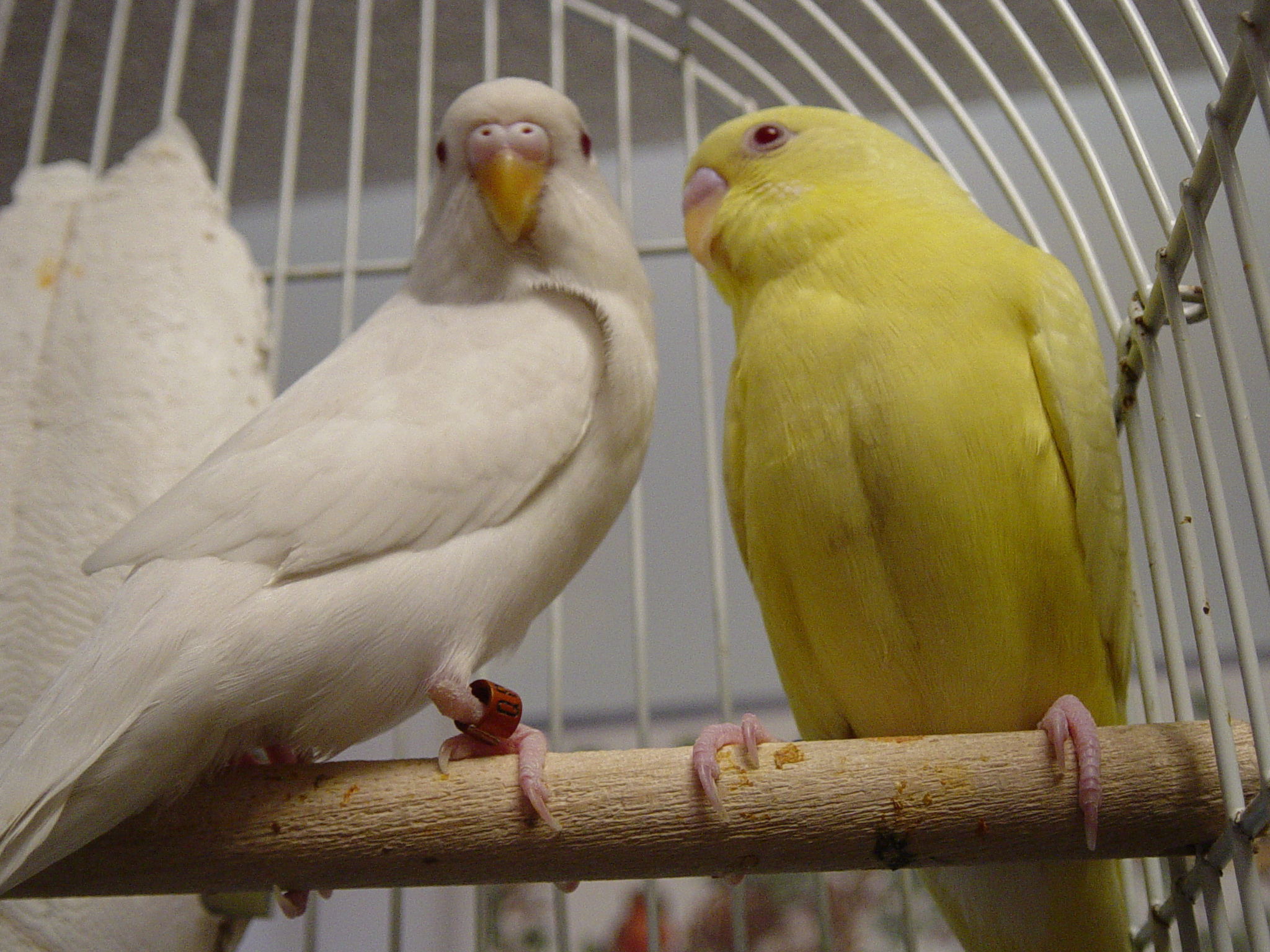
Albino hen and Lutino cock

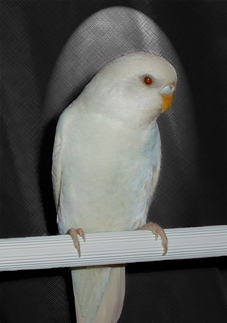
Albino hen

== Historical notes ==
The first known reference to the Ino mutation in the budgerigar was a report by Mr L van der Snickt, a Belgian fancier, in the German avicultural paper Die Gefiederte Welt (The Feathered World) in 1879[full citation?]. He wrote that he had seen that year nine Lutinos, all hens. (In fact, he called them Albinos, since the name Lutino did not then exist, but from his description and the fact that the Blue mutation was not established until the 1880s it is clear they were Lutinos.) One breeder of these birds was Mr Kessels, also of Belgium, who in 1881 bred 25 Lutinos, all hens.

A coloured picture of a Lutino appeared in the Brussels journal, Acclimatation Illustrée, in 1882, and it is thought they were being bred in the Netherlands around 1885, while in England Mr C P Arthur of Melksham in Wiltshire bred what he believed was a pair of Inos around 1887. After the 1880s no mention seems to have been made in the press of Inos until the 1930s, when interest in budgerigar mutations suddenly increased.

In 1930/31, Lutino hens were owned by both Capt H S Stokes of Longdon, near Rugeley in Staffordshire, and Mrs Huntington of Warwick. In August 1932 Mr F J Mullis of Horsham, Sussex, bred an Albino hen. None of these led to an established strain.

In September 1931, Mr E Böhm of Bawerk in Germany bred, as the last of nine young from a pair of Cobalt split Dilutes, a snow-white red-eyed hen—the first recorded Albino. Almost exactly a year later, on 12 September 1932, a second Albino hen was bred by Mr Fischer of Honow in Germany from a pair of Skyblues. Both of these strains were established by the original breeders and also by others who acquired early stock from them, in particular by Kurt Kokemüller of Arnum über Hanover, and Mr Schrapel, also of Hanover, who performed together the first genetic investigations into the Ino mutation and published the first correct pairing expectations in the German publication Der Wellensittich (The Budgerigar) in November and December 1933.

A third appearance of the Ino mutation occurred in Germany around 1933, when Mr Kuhlewein bred a Lutino hen in an uncontrolled breeding flight. This strain was also established.

Other Ino mutations also appeared in Europe in the early 1930s, and several British fanciers, including Walter Higham, Scott and Camplin, and Tod Boyd, had imported continental Lutinos by the mid-1930s. Some of these turned out to be of the non-sex-linked type and the unwitting mixing of the two mutations led to considerable confusion. All British Inos seem to have descended from these imported continental Inos.

In 1976, Dr T Daniels began a controlled programme of pairings to produce a Cinnamon Ino by deliberately crossing Cinnamons to Inos, and to estimate the cross-over value between these two mutations. The first Cinnamon Ino was produced in late 1979 and was identical in appearance to a Lacewing.

== Genetics ==
The Ino mutation is a sex-linked recessive at the ino locus on the Z chromosome. The wild-type genetic symbol is ino^{+} and the ino mutant allele has the symbol ino. Its effect is to inhibit the production of the melanin pigment which is normally present in all feather barbs in either the medullary or cortical cells or both. The presence of black melanin pigment in the cortex of the barbs is necessary for the production of the black markings and in the medulla of barbs for the production of the blue colouration (which combines with the yellow pigment in birds of the green series to produce the green colouration), so this mutation removes all black and blue colourations resulting in a white bird in the blue series and a yellow bird in the green series.

Because the Ino mutation totally inhibits the production of normal melanin pigment it prevents the visible expression of all the other mutations which depend on the presence of melanin to show their effect. This is called epistasis, and Ino is phenotypically epistatic over many other mutations, including Dark, Grey, Opaline, and the Dilute series. It is not epistatic over the Blue mutation, so there are two forms of the albino budgerigar, one in the green series called the Lutino and one in the blue series called the Albino. Both these varieties may be masking many other hypostatic mutations, so the genotype of an Albino or Lutino with respect to these mutations cannot be determined visually. Nor is the Ino mutation epistatic over the Cinnamon mutation—see below.

Sex	Genotype	Phenotype
Cocks	ino^{+}/ino^{+}	Normal
Cocks	ino^{+}/ino	Normal (/ino)
Cocks	ino/ino	Ino
Hens	ino^{+}/Y	Normal
Hens	ino/Y	Ino

In birds, the cock has two Z chromosomes and the hen has one Z and one W chromosome. So in hens whichever allele is present on the single Z chromosome is fully expressed in the phenotype. Hens cannot be split for Ino (or any other sex-linked mutation). In cocks, because Ino is recessive, the Ino allele must be present on both Z chromosomes (homozygous) to be expressed in the phenotype. Cocks which are heterozygous for Ino are identical to the corresponding Normal. Such birds are said to be split for Ino, usually written '/ino'.

The table on the right shows the appearance of all possible genetic combinations involving just the Ino mutation.

The Ino mutation does not mask the Cinnamon mutation, these two genes being neither fully epistatic nor hypostatic to each other. When combined in doubly homozygous form (cin-ino/cin-ino in cocks or cin-ino/Y in hens) the Lacewing phenotype is produced. The Cinnamon markings are clearly visible, although considerably fainter than in a normal Cinnamon. For many years the Lacewing was thought by many to be a separate mutation but it was demonstrated in 1979 that it was simply a Cinnamon Ino when a Lacewing was deliberately produced by combining separate Cinnamon and Ino genes. Once brought together, these two genes are almost always inherited together due to the close linkage between them, giving the impression of being a single gene.

The Ino mutation is a member of a series of multiple alleles at the ino locus. Only one other member is known -- the Sex-linked Clearbody mutation. For details of the genetic relationship, see the Genetics section in the Sex-linked Clearbody article.

The Ino gene is linked to other genes located on the Z chromosome, i.e. to the genes of other sex-linked mutations. In addition to the Cinnamon mutation, these mutations include Opaline and Slate. The cross-over or recombination values between Ino and these linked genes has not been measured accurately, but some approximate measurements of the cross-over values have been made:

- Cinnamon-Ino COV: Breeding results collected by C Warner and T Daniels found just 1 crossover in 36 between Cinnamon and Ino. Other measurements found at least 1 cross-over in 18, so combining these the best estimate of the recombination value is ≥4±3%.
- Opaline-Ino COV: Only one direct measurement of the Opaline-Ino linkage has been reported. This found 3 cross-overs in 10, giving a recombination value of 30±17%. But since the ino locus is very close to the cinnamon locus the COV for Opaline-Ino must be very similar to that for Opaline-Cinnamon. The Opaline-Cinnamon linkage has been measured to be approximately 36±6% (see Genetics in Opaline budgerigar mutation), so these two results are in agreement within the limited statistics.

Cocks split for both Cinnamon and Ino have one Cinnamon allele and one Ino allele together with one each of the corresponding wild-type alleles. The linkage between the Cinnamon and Ino genes gives rise to two types of split cinnamon-ino cocks, both visually identical.

- Type I split cinnamon-ino cocks are bred by mating Cinnamon-Inos (Lacewings) to Normals and have the two mutant alleles on the same chromatid, symbolised as cin^{+}-ino^{+}/cin-ino. Geneticists call this 'coupling' rather than 'Type I'. Because of the linkage, the Cinnamon and Ino alleles from Type I cocks tend to be inherited together in their progeny. When mated to Normal hens, Type I cocks produce predominantly Cinnamon-Ino (Lacewing) and Normal hens, with Cinnamon and Ino hens resulting extremely rarely from a cross-over. Roughly 48% of the hens will be Cinnamon-Ino (Lacewing), 48% Normal, 2% Cinnamon and 2% Ino.
- Type II split cinnamon ino cocks are bred by mating Cinnamons to Inos and have the Cinnamon and Ino mutant alleles on opposite chromatids, symbolised as cin^{+}-ino/cin-ino^{+}. Geneticists call this 'repulsion' rather than 'Type II'. Because of the separation, the Cinnamon and Ino alleles from Type II birds tend to be inherited separately in their progeny. When mated to Normal hens, Type II cocks produce predominantly Cinnamon and Ino hens, with Cinnamon-Ino (Lacewing) and Normal hens resulting extremely rarely from cross-overs. Roughly 48% of the hens will be Cinnamon, 48% Ino, 2% Cinnamon-Ino (Lacewing) and 2% Normal.

Hens cannot be split for any sex-linked gene, so only cocks exist in Type I and Type II form.
