= Dilute budgerigar mutation =

Genetic mutation affecting the colour of budgerigars

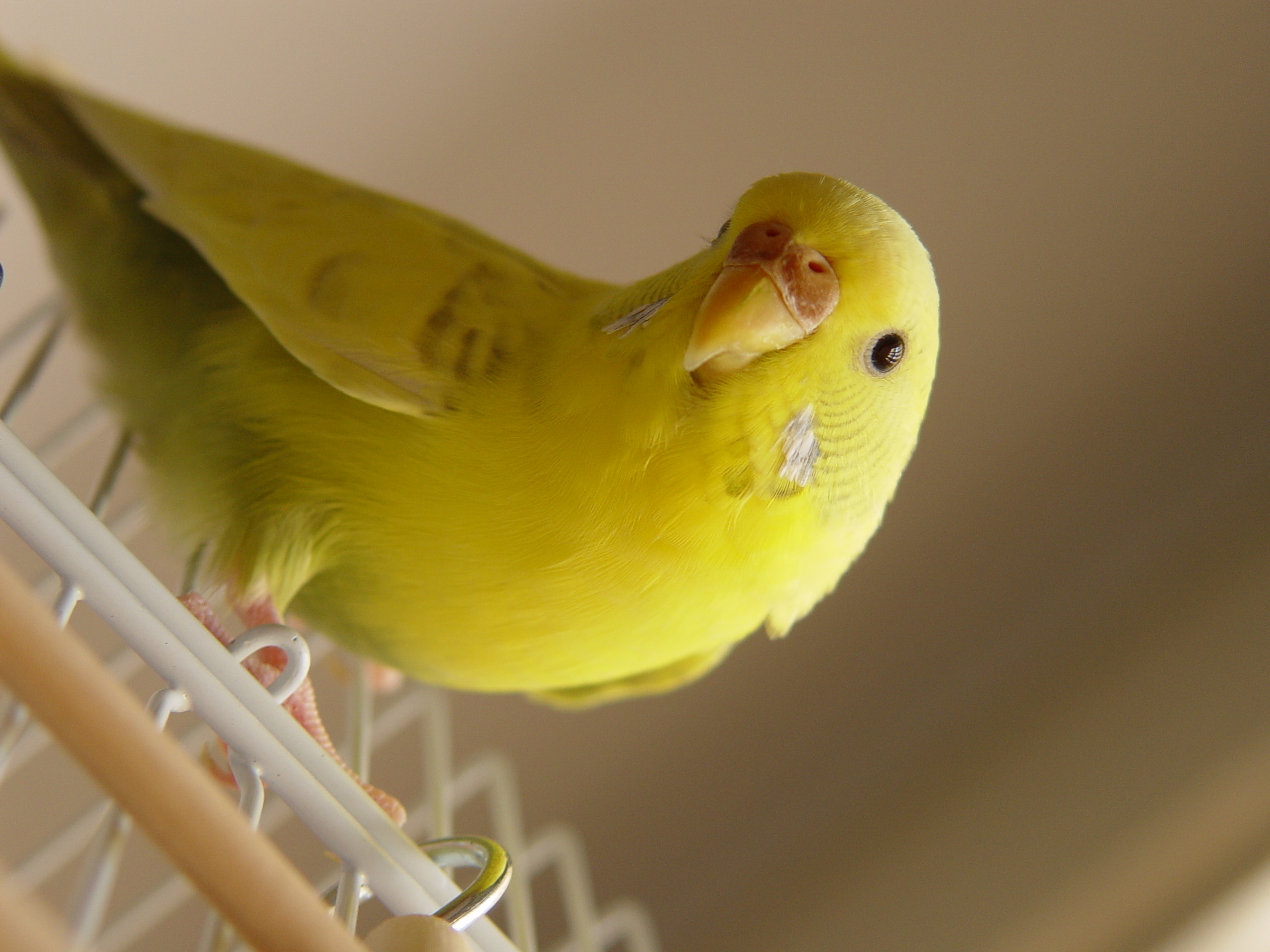
Yellow budgerigar with hallmarks of the dilute mutation – white cheek patches and faded wingbars

The Dilute budgerigar mutation is one of approximately 30 mutations affecting the colour of budgerigars. It is one of the constituent mutations of several recognised varieties: the Light, Dark, Olive, Grey and Suffused Yellows and the Grey and Suffused Whites.

== Appearance ==
The Dilute mutation changes the body colour of the wild-type Light Green to yellow, with a variable amount of light green suffusion. The suffusion is deepest on the rump and around the vent. The spots and markings on the wing, head and neck, which are black in the wild-type, are pale grey. The cheek patches are pale lavender and the long tail feathers are pale bluey-grey. The eyes remain normal, with white irises when adult. There is considerable variation in the intensity of the green suffusion, but the best exhibition birds of the 1930s showed very little and also had very faint wing markings. These are the Dilute Light Greens, usually known as Light Yellows.

The green suffusion becomes progressively darker when single and double factors of the Dark mutation are present. These are the Dilute Dark Greens and Dilute Olives, usually known as Dark and Olive Yellows. When the suffusion is particularly heavy the bird is known as a Suffused Yellow.

In the blue series the absence of the yellow pigment turns the body colour to white, although this is usually suffused with blue, often quite heavily. When the suffusion is light, Dilute Skyblues are known as Whites; when it is heavy they are known as Suffused Whites. Dilute Cobalts and Mauves are usually known as Suffused Whites.

== Historical notes ==
Budgerigars were first introduced into Europe by the ornithologist and bird artist, John Gould, in 1840, when he imported to England a pair which had been bred by his brother-in-law, Charles Coxon. They grew steadily in popularity. For the first thirty years of their domestication only the wild-type Light Green budgerigar was known, but in 1872 birds with greenish-yellow bodies and very pale wing markings were reported from Belgium (in both Brussels and Antwerp) and Germany (in both Kassel and Berlin). This, now known as the Dilute mutation, was the first mutation observed in the domesticated budgerigar.

Joseph Abrahams obtained some of these new yellow birds from Belgium and bred the first Yellow, as it was called, in Great Britain in 1884. These strains, in both Britain and Europe, laid the foundations for the very popular exhibition Light Yellow of the 1920s and 30s, which were often known by the alternative names of Buttercups or Buttercup Yellows. The popularity of the variety declined after the Lutino became available in the late 1930s.

In 1896, George Keartland of the Calvert Expedition to the Great Sandy Desert of Western Australia, observed a yellow budgerigar flying wild in a flock on three occasions. This suggests the Dilute mutation is relatively common in heterozygous form among the wild populations, as two such heterozygous individuals would need to mate in order to produce a visible Dilute.

Although the Blue mutation was first seen soon after the first Dilutes, in 1878, and had become established by 1890 in Europe, the first combination of the Blue and Dilute mutations in double homozygous form did not appear until around 1920, some 30 to 40 years later. This combination was the White (known as Silver in Australia), and it was first bred in England by H D Astley in September 1920 from a pair of Skyblues. A White was also reported in Paris in the same year. Whites were never as popular as the Yellows, as it was much harder to approach the exhibition ideal of a pure white bird.

== Genetics ==
The Dilute mutation is recessive to its wild-type allele, so a bird possessing a single Dilute allele (the heterozygote) is identical in appearance to the wild-type Light Green. That is, the presence of a single wild-type allele is sufficient to permit the production of the normal number of melanin granules. Among the budgerigar fancy such a bird is said to be a Light Green split dilute, usually written Light Green/dilute, although Light Green/yellow has been used.

In a bird which has two Dilute alleles (the homozygote) the number of melanin granules is greatly reduced, to around 5% of the normal amount. This results in a much reduced intensity of the black markings, and less absorption of light which passes through the cloudy layer in the medulla of barbs. As this absorption of light is a necessary part of the process which generates the blue colouration the intensity of blue is also greatly reduced.

The Dilute mutation is one of a series of multiple alleles at the same locus, called dil^{+} in the wild-type. The others are the Clearwing (dil^{cw}) and Greywing (dil^{gw}) mutations. The Dilute allele (dil^{d}) is recessive to all other alleles at this locus, so for the Dilute character to be expressed in the phenotype the genotype must be homozygous for this allele.
