= Opaline budgerigar mutation =

Genetic mutation affecting the colour of budgerigars

The Opaline budgerigar mutation is one of approximately 30 mutations affecting the colour or appearance of budgerigars. It is the underlying mutation of the Opaline variety. When combined with the Yellowface II and Clearwing mutations the Rainbow variety is produced.

== Appearance ==
The Opaline mutation is characterised by several features which are invariably present, although many show variations in the intensity of their expression. The most obvious effect is on the striations which extend from the top of the head down the neck to between the wings in the non-Opaline. In the Opaline these striations are very much reduced in intensity, being almost absent in many individuals, particularly in small birds of yellow (as opposed to buff) feather. The cap of the Opaline extends further back over the top of the head, gradually merging into an area the same colour as the body which continues down the back of the head to form a 'V' shape between the wings. The intensity of the striations in this area is variable, but in the original mutations, particularly the Australian, the 'V' was very clear.

In the non-Opaline the wings show dark grey or black markings over a yellow or white ground, but in the Opaline the ends of the barbs of the wing coverts assume the same colour as the body, rather than the ground colour. This suffusion of body colour in the wings produces the opalescent effect which gave the mutation its name. The area of black pigmentation in each feather is reduced and in the original specimens the wing butts were particularly devoid of black pigment, resulting in a clear area often called the 'thumb-print'. These thumb-prints appear to be associated with a clear 'V', but are now seen less often, since the Budgerigar Standard calls for normal wing markings in the Opaline.

The flight feathers of the budgerigar consist of 10 primaries and 10 secondaries. These are dark grey with a clear central band across every feather from the 2nd primary to the 8th secondary. These clear areas are not visible in the folded wing, but form a prominent continuous band running right along the wing when it is stretched out. It is hidden from above by the coverts but is visible from beneath. In the Opaline this clear band is present on every flight feather and is much broader. Only the distal half of the flight feather is dark, with the clear zone extending from the midpoint to the shaft. Because it is broader it is visible in the primaries of the folded wing of the Opaline, just beneath the secondaries and primary wing coverts, as a small clear patch.

A similar effect occurs in all the wing feathers, most noticeably in the primary and secondary wing coverts, and also in the six tail feathers, which carry a similar clear band on feathers 2 to 6 in the non-Opaline. The first (longest) tail feather of the Opaline also carries a rather blotchy clear area of somewhat variable extent, and the suffusion of body colour present to a small degree in the non-Opaline is intensified in the Opaline.

Most Opalines show a brighter body colour than the corresponding non-Opaline, particularly in nest feather and particularly in the rump area. This is due to a reduction in the melanin content of the barbules of the contour feathers.

The final characteristic of the Opaline (and the Cinnamon) is the colour of the down feathers of the young nestling. These are white instead of the usual grey, and this allows Opalines to be identified at a very early age.

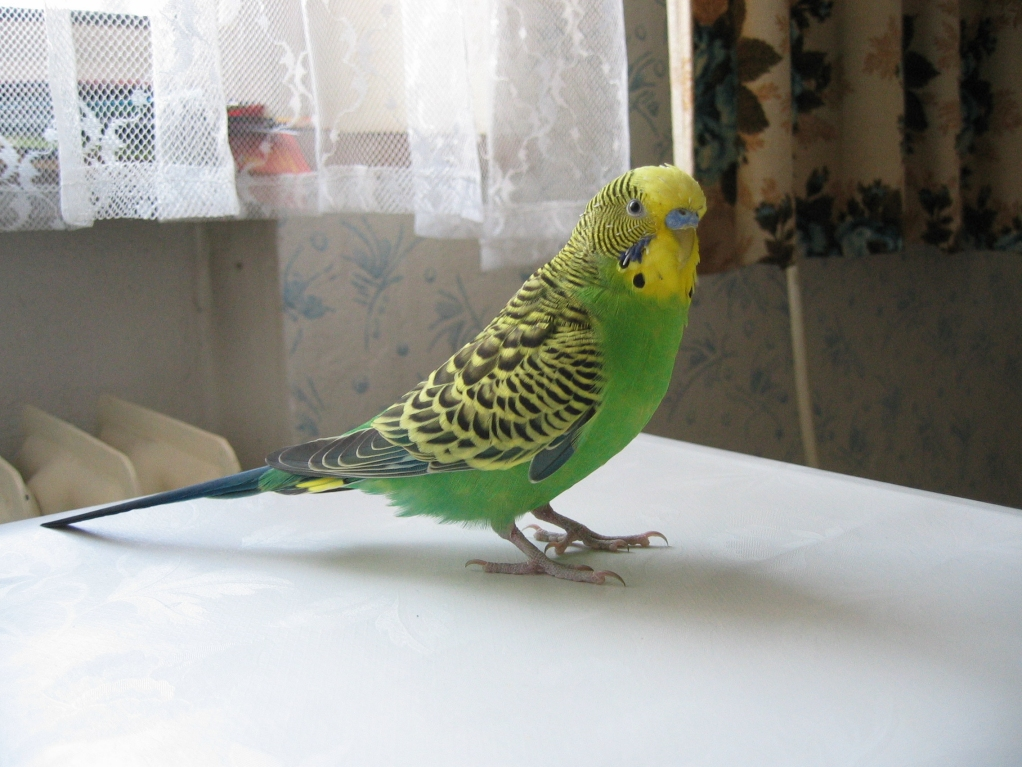
Light Green cock

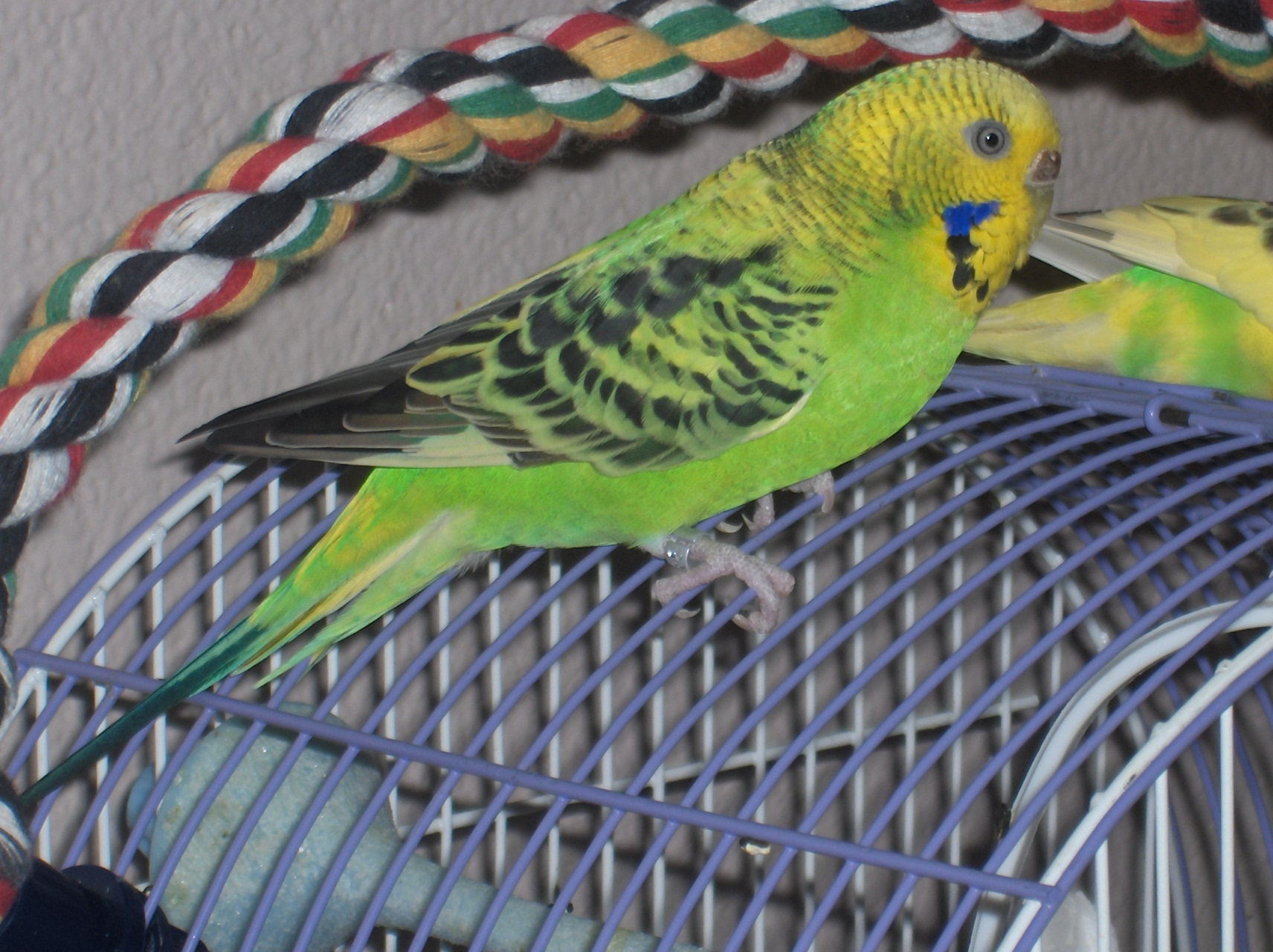
Opaline Light Green hen

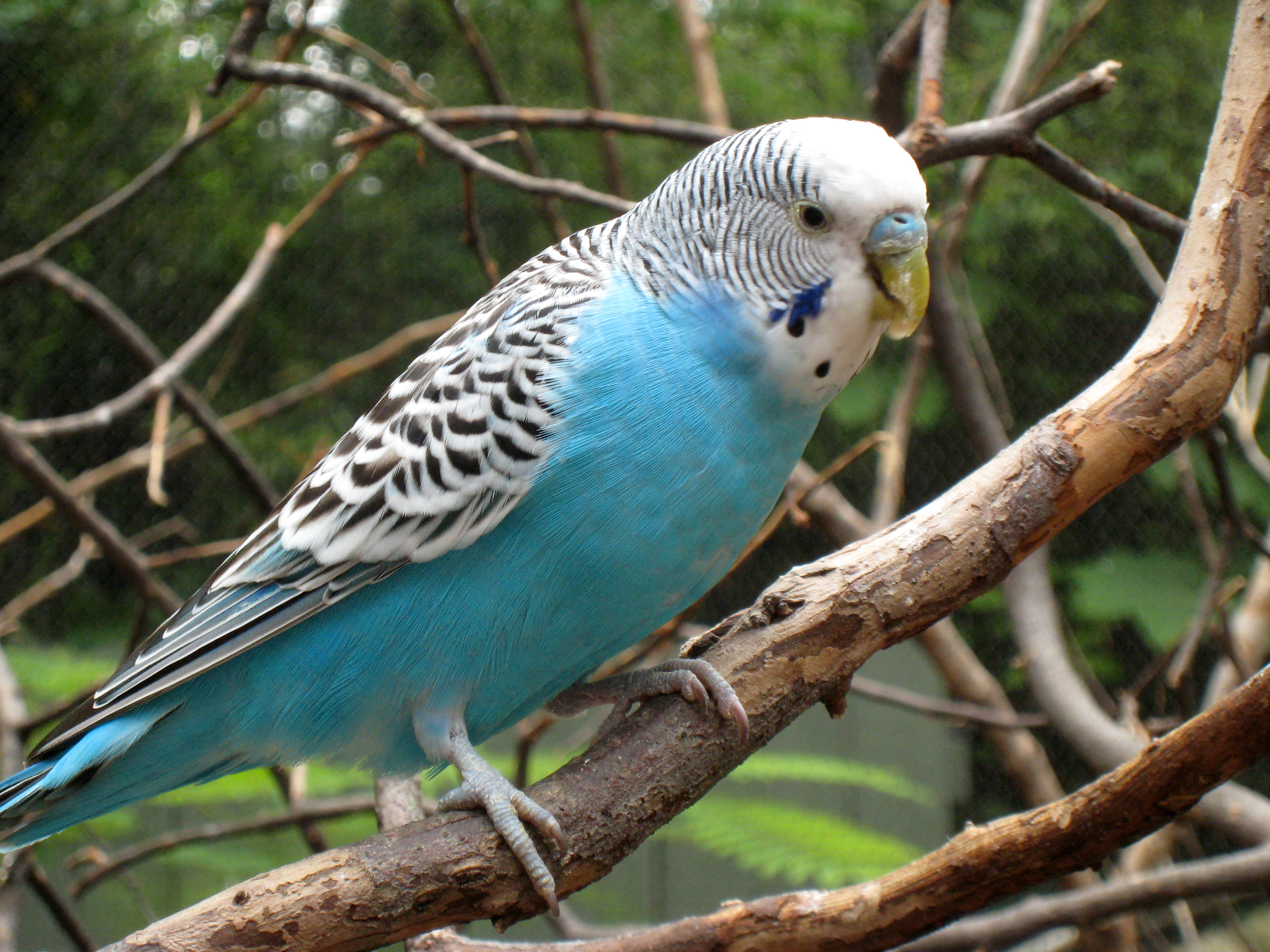
Cobalt cock

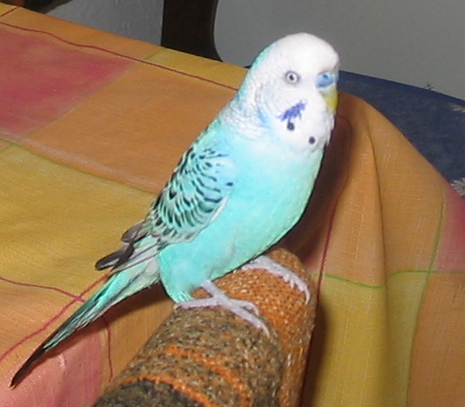
Opaline Skyblue cock

== Historical notes ==
In 1933 A Brown of Kilmarnock, Scotland, bred what was described as a 'pied' Cobalt hen from a perfectly normal Skyblue cock and Mauve hen. The parents came from a strain kept locally which had never produced anything unusual, and Brown bred no more than the one mutant, even though the same pair bred many Cobalts in both 1933 and 1935.

Towards the end of 1933 Mr and Mrs Ashby of nearby Ayr purchased this 'pied' Cobalt, which they described as being "exceptionally large with a fine head and most excellent spots", although both parents were quite mediocre. The mutant's peculiarities were that the head, neck and nape were almost pure white with slight markings in places and nearly all the flight feathers, primaries and secondaries, were edged with cobalt in place of white, making the bird almost a 'Cobalt-wing'. The mutant was not a pied of any of the present-day types (these were not established in 1933), but an Opaline, although the variety was not to be known by that name until a few years later.

In 1934 the Ashby's paired the mutant hen to a quality Light Green split blue cock and Skyblues, Light Greens and a Dark Green of a perfectly normal appearance were bred. In 1935 one of the Skyblue cocks was mated back to the mutant hen, and the very first nest produced two Opaline Cobalt cocks and an Opaline Skyblue hen. The Opaline mutation had been fixed.

Early in 1936 circumstances forced the Ashby's to dispose of all their Opalines, which at that time were known as 'Marbled', and the entire stock, with the exception of two pairs which went to Andy Wilson of Glasgow, went to Walter Higham of Blackburn, under the care of his aviary manager, Len Hillas. From these two studs came the vast majority of British Opalines, most of them carrying the wide head and large spots which first caught the attention of the Ashby's.

In Australia, also around 1933 (the exact date is uncertain), S E Terrill discovered a mutant budgerigar, a Light Green hen in nest feather, among thousands of wild birds caught by trappers and sent to Adelaide market. He bought her, and described her special features as "... almost complete absence of barring on the back of the neck and mantle and its replacement by the body colour ... the mask being extended back, covering the top of the head ... the bars on the wing coverts reduced in number and intensity, their yellow margins being greatly enlarged and much suffused in green."

Terrill, who lived near Adelaide, paired the hen to a Blue Silver (the Australian name at the time for the variety now known as Dilute Skyblue or White) and bred three cocks and a hen in 1934, all Light Green in appearance. In about November 1935 the three cocks were paired up, one to a Cinnamon Light Green, one to a Cobalt and one to his mother. The first two pairings produced six Opalines, all hens, and the third several Opalines, both cocks and hens. The name 'Opaline' was suggested in 1936 by R J Byfield of Hobart, Tasmania, on being particularly impressed by the vividness of colour shown by these young birds in nest feather. Terrill adopted the name and after he suggested it in the Budgerigar Bulletin in September 1936 it rapidly gained universal acceptance throughout the world.

Perhaps neither Brown nor Terrill were the first to breed an Opaline. In 1962 J Riley of Yorkshire wrote, "In 1930 or 1931 a pair of my Light Greens produced a chick that was of good size and type with mask and spots that were a living dream; the only snag was that its wings were mismarked and grizzled, these markings extending over the bird's back." Riley kept the bird and used it to try to improve the spots of his Light Greens, but further 'mis-marked' birds appeared. He disposed of them all soon afterwards and only a long time later did he see Opalines and realise that he had bred them first and cast them aside.

The Opaline appeared yet again in 1935, in the aviaries of L Raymaekers in Brussels. Higham imported two Opaline Mauve cocks and one Opaline Greywing Mauve hen from Raymaekers in 1937. Cyril Rogers confirmed they were the same mutation as the Scottish one, although their wing barring seemed noticeably lighter.

== Genetics ==
The Opaline mutation is sex-linked, the locus of its gene being carried on the X chromosome. It is recessive to wild-type. The gene locus has the symbol op. The wild-type allele at this locus is notated op^{+} and the Opaline allele is notated op.

Sex	Genotype	Phenotype
Cocks	op^{+}/op^{+}	Normal
Cocks	op^{+}/op	Normal (/opaline)
Cocks	op/op	Opaline
Hens	op^{+}/Y	Normal
Hens	op/Y	Opaline

In birds, the cock has two X chromosomes and the hen has one X and one Y chromosome. Therefore, in hens whichever allele is present on the single X chromosome is fully expressed in the phenotype. Hens cannot be split for Opaline (or any other sex-linked mutation). In cocks, because Opaline is recessive, the Opaline allele must be present on both X chromosomes (homozygous) to be expressed in the phenotype. Cocks which are heterozygous for Opaline are identical to the corresponding Normal. Such birds are said to be split for Opaline, usually written '/opaline'.

The table on the right shows the appearance of all possible genetic combinations involving the Opaline mutation.

The Opaline gene is linked to other genes located on the X chromosome, i.e. to the genes of other sex-linked mutations. These sex-linked mutations include the Cinnamon and Slate mutations and the two allelic mutations at the ino locus—the Ino and the Sex-linked Clearbody. The cross-over or recombination values between Opaline and these linked genes has not been measured accurately, but results collected by C Warner and T Daniels found 41 crossovers in 113 between Cinnamon and Opaline, giving a recombination ratio of 36±6%. Since the ino locus is known to be very close to the cin locus, the recombination ratio between Opaline and both Ino and Sex-linked Clearbody must also be around 36%. The opinion has been expressed that there is a close link between Opaline and Slate.

Cocks split for both Cinnamon and Opaline have one Cinnamon allele and one Opaline allele together with one each of the corresponding wild-type alleles. The linkage between the Cinnamon and Opaline genes gives rise to two types of split cinnamon-opaline cocks, both visually identical.

- Type I split cinnamon-opalines cocks are bred by mating Cinnamon-Opalines to Normals and have the two mutant alleles on the same chromatid, symbolised as cin^{+}-op^{+}/cin-op. Geneticists call this 'coupling' rather than 'Type I'. Because of the linkage, the Cinnamon and Opaline alleles from Type I cocks tend to be inherited together in their progeny. When mated to Normal hens, Type I cocks produce predominantly Cinnamon-Opaline and Normal hens, with Cinnamon and Opaline hens resulting rarely from a cross-over. Roughly one third of the hens will be Cinnamon-Opaline, one third Normal, one sixth Cinnamon and one sixth Opaline.
- Type II split cinnamon-opaline cocks are bred by mating Cinnamons to Opalines and have the Cinnamon and Opaline mutant alleles on opposite chromatids, symbolised as cin^{+}-op/cin-op^{+}. Geneticists call this 'repulsion' rather than 'Type II'. Because of the separation, the Cinnamon and Opaline alleles from Type II birds tend to be inherited separately in their progeny. When mated to Normal hens, Type II cocks produce predominantly Cinnamon and Opaline hens, with Cinnamon-Opaline and Normal hens resulting rarely from cross-overs. Roughly one third of the hens will be Cinnamon, one third Opaline, one sixth Cinnamon-Opaline and one sixth Normal.

Hens cannot be split for any sex-linked gene, so only cocks exist in Type I and Type II form.
