= Dominant Grey budgerigar mutation =

Genetic mutation affecting the colour of budgerigars

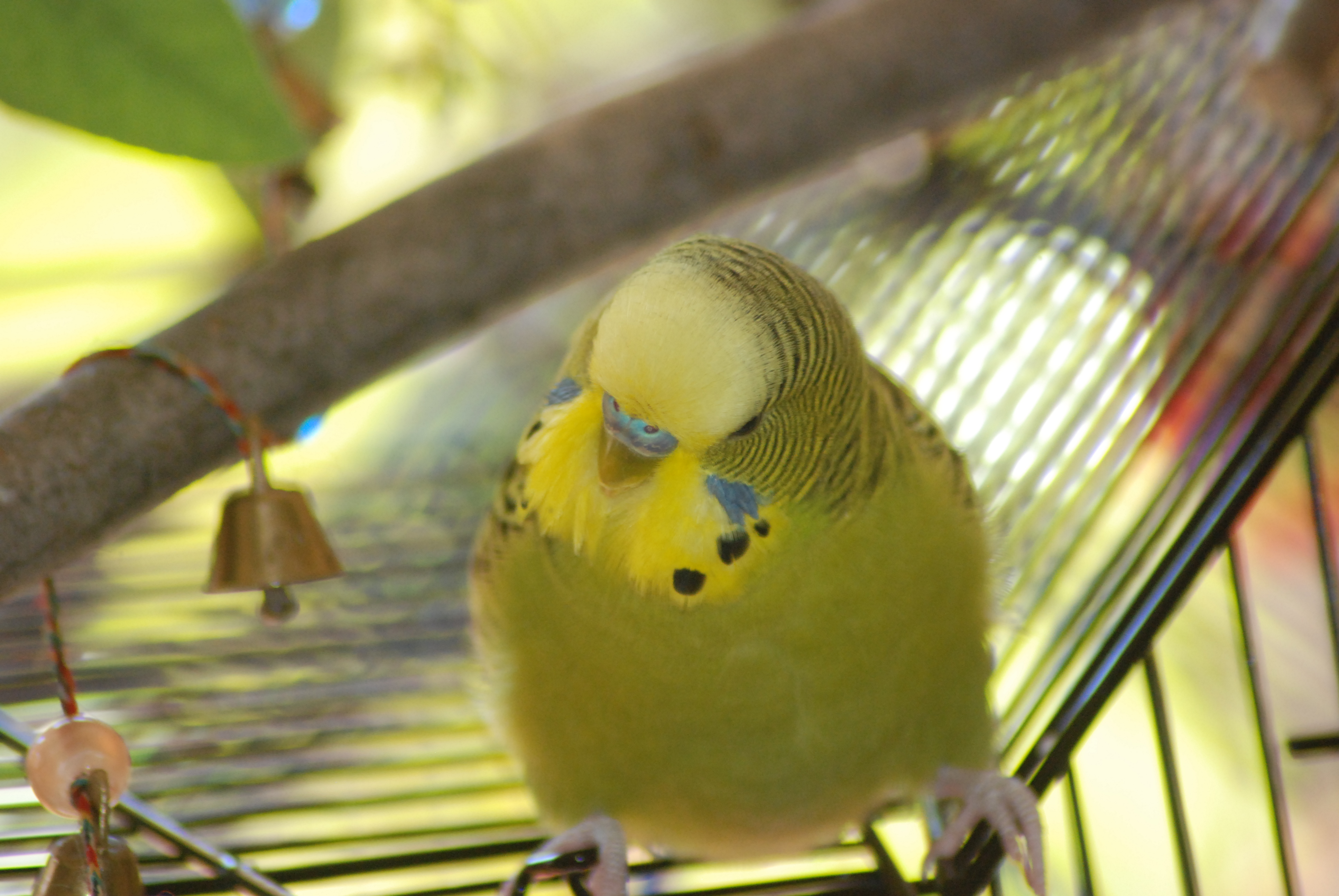
Grey-Green cock, showing the Dominant Grey mutation

The Dominant Grey budgerigar mutation, often called the Australian Grey or simply Grey, is one of approximately 30 mutations affecting the colour of budgerigars. It is the basis of the Grey-Green and Grey standard varieties.

== Appearance ==
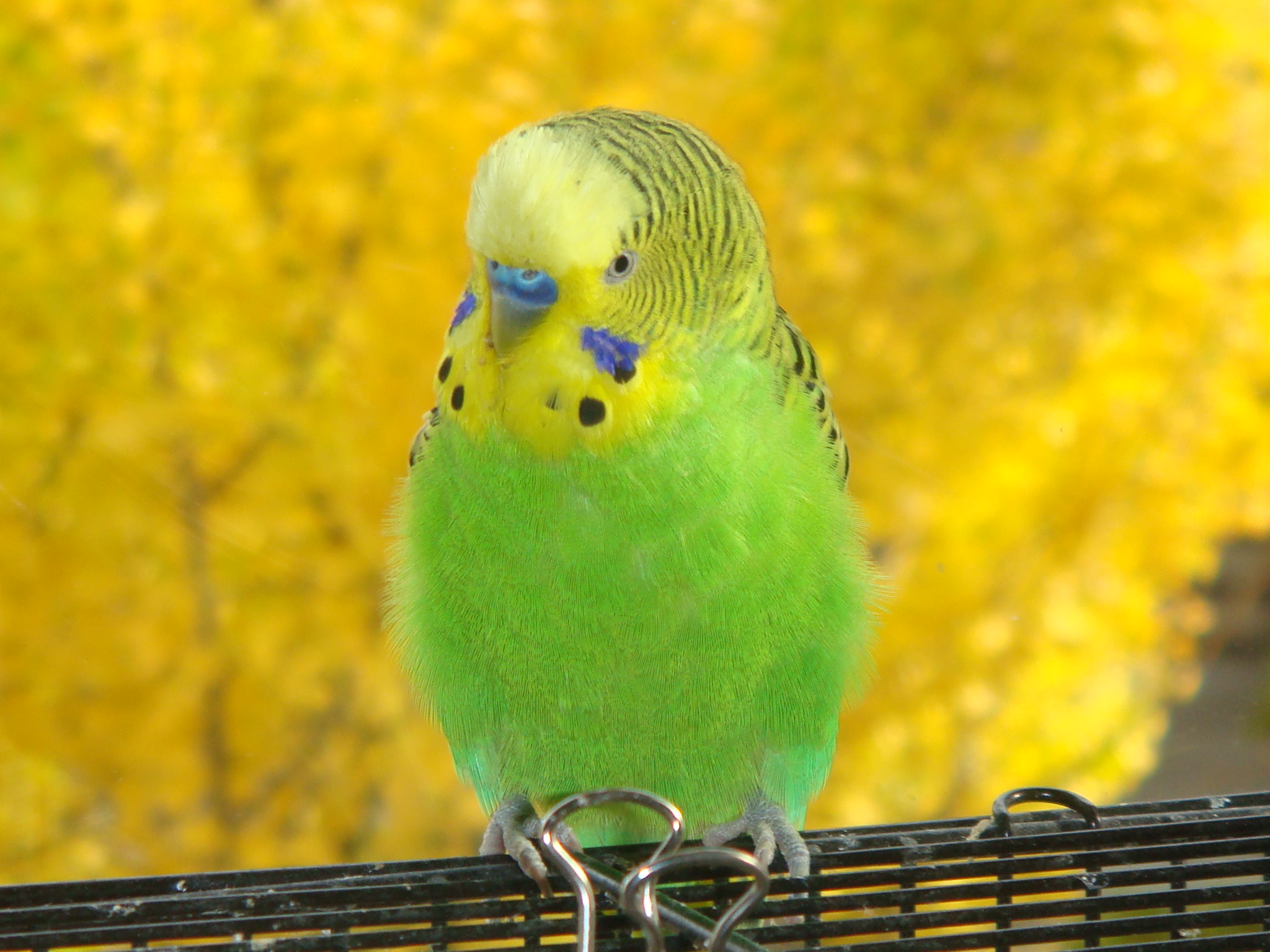
A Light Green cock, unmodified by the mutation

The Dominant Grey mutation transforms the wild-type Light Green into the Grey-Green variety and the Skyblue into the Light Grey variety. The body colour of the Grey-Green is a dull mustard green and, compared to a Light Green, the mask is a slightly duller tone of yellow. The body colour of the Light Grey is an even, uniform, battle-ship grey.

In both the blue and green series birds the flights and long tail feathers are black. The pattern of black on the wing and tail markings is unchanged, but they are darkened to a jet black, resulting in high contrast between the black and yellow, which is particularly noticeable in the tail bar when the bird is in flight. The cheek patches are lilac-grey.

Variety	Pantone colour
Light Green	375
Grey-Green	398
Skyblue	310
Grey	428

When combined with the Dark mutation the body colour of both Greys and Grey-Greens becomes slightly darker, but the effect is much smaller than the effect of the Dark mutation on Light Greens and Skyblues.

As this is a dominant mutation the colour changes described above apply to both single factor (SF) and double factor (DF) Greys and Grey-Greens. The only difference between SF and DF birds is in the colour of the afterfeather and shaft (see Feather) of the contour feathers. In the SF Light Grey these are the normal white but in the DF birds the afterfeather is dark grey, with a black shaft.

The World Budgerigar Organisation has established precise standards for certain budgerigar body colours using Pantone colour numbers, as shown in the table.

== Historical notes ==
The earliest recorded appearance of the Dominant Grey mutation was in 1934, when S Harrison of Murrumbeena, Victoria, Australia, purchased a Grey cock from a dealer. The original breeder has not been identified. Early breeding results showed this Grey to be a Dark Grey (SF)/dilute, and Mrs Harrison went on to establish a substantial strain of Greys from this bird.

In 1936, it was reported that W F Shepherd of Kew, Victoria, also had Greys which he obtained from a colony breeder, and a Grey was also bred independently by R Hancock of Beverley, South Australia, in 1935.

Dominant Greys were first imported to Britain around 1937, one by R Brown of Morecambe for Walter Higham, and one, from R Hancock's stock, by Tom Goodwin.

== Genetics ==
The Dominant Grey allele is dominant over its wild-type allele, so a bird possessing a single Dominant Grey allele (the heterozygote or single-factor Dominant Grey) is converted from the wild-type Light Green to Grey-green as described in Appearance above. That is, the presence of a single Dominant Grey allele is sufficient to permit the full expression of the mutation.

The double-factor Dominant Grey, with two Dominant Grey alleles, is identical in appearance to the single-factor Dominant Grey, although there is some evidence that the colour of the breast afterfeathers is changed from white to grey in the double-factor bird.

The Dominant Grey gene is located on one of the autosomal chromosomes. There is no known linkage of this gene with any other mutation.
