= Cultural discourse about the Gaza genocide =

Discourse about the Gaza genocide

The Gaza genocide has been a contentious topic in cultural discourse during the ongoing Gaza war. Celebrities, athletes, public intellectuals, activists, cultural institutions and ordinary people have weighed in on the events in Gaza, as well as the cultural and societal implications of viewing those events through the framework of genocide.

== Cultural discourse ==
Public figures who have said Israel is committing genocide in Gaza include Kid Cudi, Macklemore, Kneecap, Massive Attack, Summer Walker, Chris Brown, John Lurie, Dua Lipa, and Fontaines D.C. Time described a "growing divide" within Hollywood over the war. The genocide scholar Raz Segal's verdict that Israel's actions in Gaza are a "textbook genocide" was quoted approvingly by the climate activist Greta Thunberg and the BBC football presenter Gary Lineker.

In the UK, a group of over 2,000 artists and celebrities calling themselves Artists for Palestine signed a letter on October 17, 2023, stating, "We are witnessing a crime and a catastrophe. Israel has reduced much of Gaza to rubble, and cut off the supply of water, power, food and medicine to 2.3 million Palestinians. In the words of the UN's undersecretary for humanitarian affairs, 'the spectre of death' is hanging over the territory." Since then, the letter has grown to have 4,409 signatures, and includes signees such as Tilda Swinton, Steve Coogan, and Miriam Margolyes.

In October 2025, more than 450 Jewish and Israeli figures including Knesset member Avraham Burg, former peace negotiator Daniel Levy, author Naomi Klein, film-maker Jonathan Glazer, actor Wallace Shawn, and writer Benjamin Moser signed an open letter known as Jews Demand Action, urging the United Nations to impose sanctions against Israel and demanding accountability over Israel's actions in Gaza, the West Bank and East Jerusalem.

In 2026, more than 5,000 public figures signed a letter organised by Creative Community for Peace rejecting the claim that Israel is committing genocide in Gaza.

=== Music ===
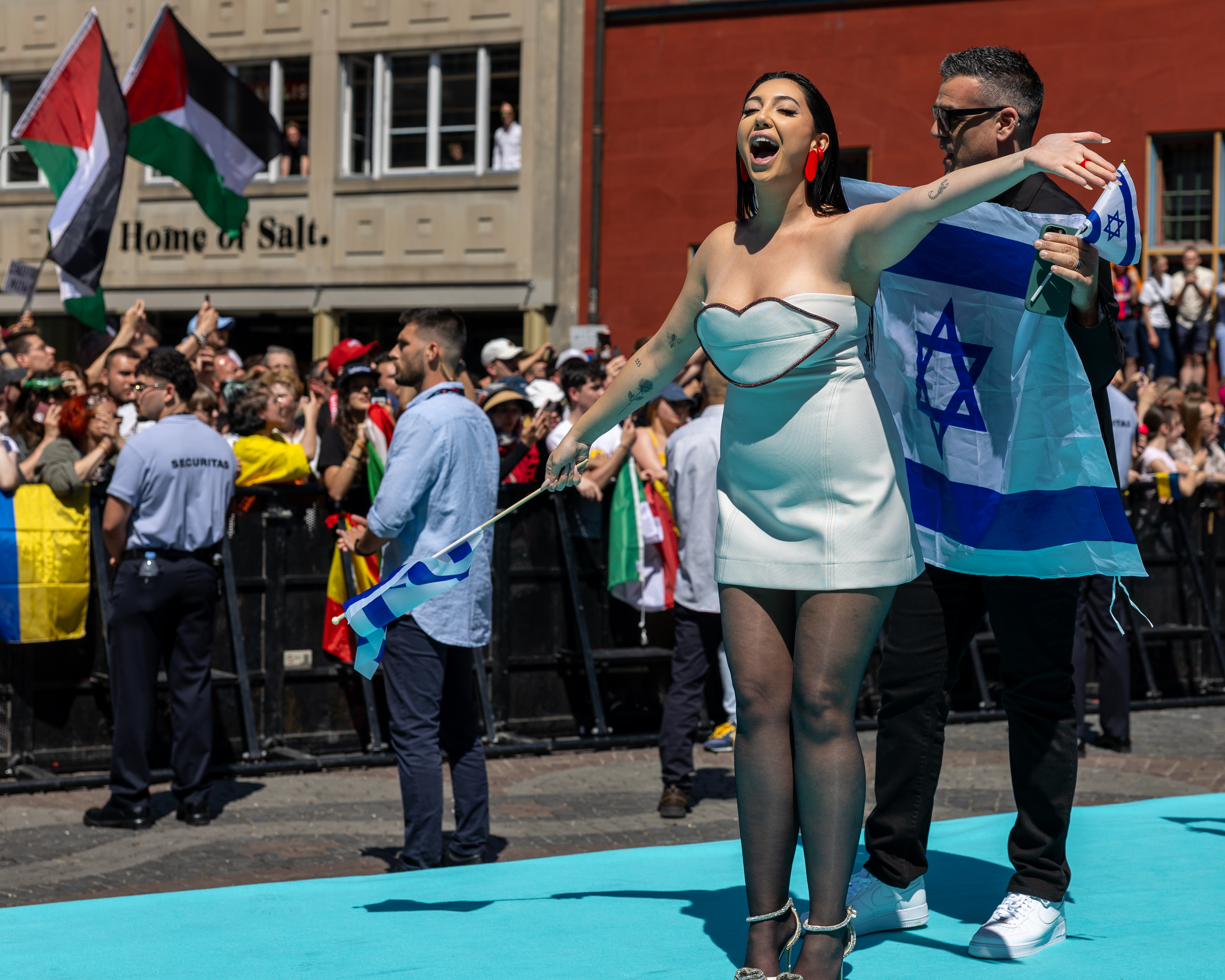
Yuval Raphael, who represented Israel in the Eurovision Song Contest 2025 in Basel, Switzerland, at the opening ceremony with pro-Palestinian demonstrations in the background

Israel's participation in the Eurovision Song Contest has become controversial since the outbreak of the war in Gaza, with protests and petitions demanding the country be excluded from the event, while some pro-Israel groups launched petitions of their own in support of Israel's continued inclusion. Israeli officials ran advertising campaigns to encourage support for their country's entries, which was cited as one of the factors leading to Israel placing within the top two of the public vote at the 2024 and 2025 editions. Participating broadcasters from Iceland, Ireland, the Netherlands, Slovenia, and Spain boycotted the 2026 edition after Israel was permitted to compete.

Numerous musicians have withdrawn from music festivals for the festivals' relationships with companies alleged to be complicit in genocide. Over 100 acts dropped out of The Great Escape Festival in protest against the event's sponsor, Barclays, which they said was "bankrolling genocide". Several artists also dropped out of the Latitude Festival over its Barclays sponsorship. Over 80 musicians boycotted the 2024 South by Southwest festival because of the event's partnership with the US Army and Raytheon. Several of those musicians accused the companies of being linked to genocide. In May 2025, over 50 artists signed a letter urging Field Day to cut ties with the private equity firm KKR, saying "the festival is now implicated in the crimes against humanity of apartheid and genocide."

Palestinian Campaign for the Academic and Cultural Boycott of Israel (PACBI) has accused Radiohead of "complicit silence" in "Israel's genocide against Palestinians in Gaza" and urged fans to boycott the band's upcoming 2025 tour. PACBI previously protested against two planned UK concerts by Radiohead guitarist Jonny Greenwood and Israeli musician Dudu Tassa, saying that they were "artwashing genocide". The two concerts were cancelled due to "credible threats". PACBI argued that Tassa had performed for Israeli troops during the Gaza war, and that Greenwood and Tassa performed concerts in "apartheid Tel Aviv while Israeli forces burned Palestinians alive in Rafah". Regarding the Tel Aviv shows, Greenwood said critics were "silencing Israeli artists for being born Jewish in Israel".

In September 2025, over 400 artists called for their music to be removed from streaming platforms in Israel as part of a campaign labeled "No Music For Genocide".

=== Literature ===
When asked whether what is happening in Gaza is a genocide, the author Masha Gessen said, "I think there are some fine distinctions between genocide and ethnic cleansing and I think that there are valid arguments for using both terms." When pressed further, they said, "it is at the very least ethnic cleansing". Controversy surrounded Gessen's reception of the Hannah Arendt Prize over a New Yorker article critical of Israeli actions in Gaza in which Gessen compared them to Nazis liquidating a ghetto.

The novelist Omar El Akkad has called the Gaza war a genocide and wrote the book One Day, Everyone Will Have Always Been Against This about Western complicity in it.

Author Sally Rooney has written that Israel is committing genocide and that the UK is complicit through its "material and diplomatic support". She pledged to financially support Palestine Action, despite the group's proscription in the UK.

Journalist and author Zukiswa Wanner and artist Mohamed Abla have both criticised the German government for supporting the "ethnic cleansing, murder and genocide" of Gaza.

In a 2025 interview with Juan Cole, the journalist and author Ta-Nehisi Coates, referring to the Democratic Party said that "if you can't draw the line at genocide, you probably can't draw the line at democracy", referring to the actions of the second presidency of Donald Trump.

=== Film and television ===
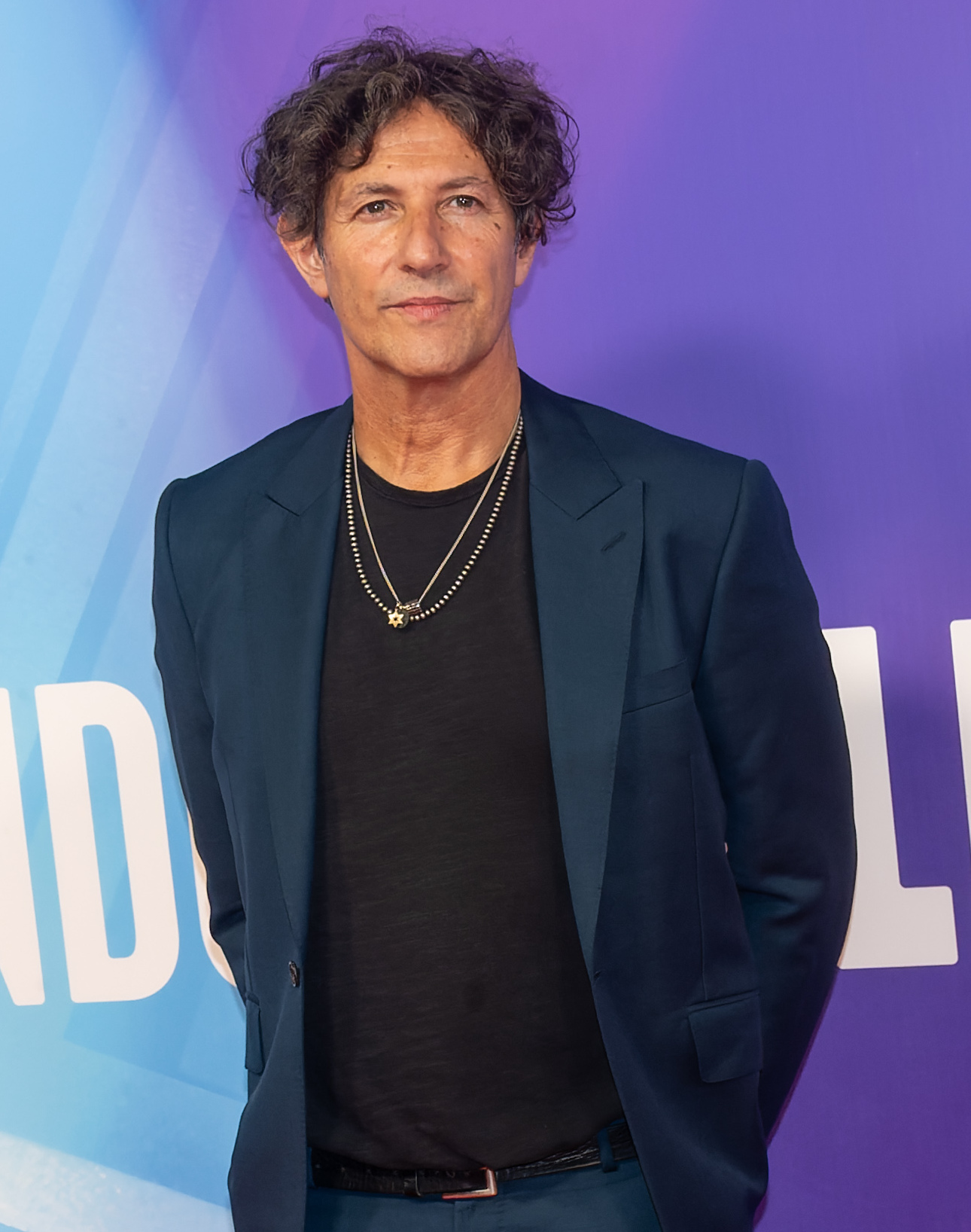
Jonathan Glazer at the London Film Festival, October 2023

While accepting the Academy Award for Best International Feature Film for The Zone of Interest, Jonathan Glazer drew parallels between the depiction of the Holocaust in his film and Israel's actions in Gaza. Journalist Naomi Klein expanded on the parallels between Gaza and the film's depiction of the Holocaust, highlighting the normalisation of genocidal action. Similarly, in an interview with The New York Times in July 2025, Jewish American actor Mandy Patinkin pleaded, “To watch what is happening, for the Jewish people to allow this to happen to children and civilians of all ages in Gaza, for whatever reason, is unconscionable and unthinkable...And I ask you Jews, everywhere, all over the world, to spend some time alone and think, Is this acceptable and sustainable? How could it be done to you and your ancestors and you turn around and you do it to someone else?”

In February 2025, British animator Joanna Quinn and others founded the collective Animation Community for Palestine (ac4pal) to support the work of Palestinian animator Haneen Koraz, who produces films with children in Gaza during the genocide.

At the 2025 Cannes Film Festival, over 350 members of the film industry signed a letter saying, "we cannot remain silent while genocide is taking place in Gaza and this unspeakable news is hitting our communities hard." The letter was dedicated to Palestinian journalist Fatma Hassona, who was killed by an Israeli airstrike.

In August 2025, at the Venice Film Festival, hundreds of filmmakers, artists, and cultural figures signed an open letter under the banner of Venice4Palestine, calling on the festival to take "a clear and ambiguous stand" against the Gaza genocide.

In September 2025, more than 4,000 artists signed a pledge by Film Workers for Palestine not to work with Israeli film institutions complicit in Israel's actions and denounced the "unrelenting horror" in Gaza. The pledge states:

Inspired by Filmmakers United Against Apartheid who refused to screen their films in apartheid South Africa, we pledge not to screen films, appear at or otherwise work with Israeli film institutions – including festivals, cinemas, broadcasters and production companies – that are implicated in genocide and apartheid against the Palestinian people.

In an interview with Jay Shetty on On Purpose With Jay Shetty, British actress Emma Watson stated:

"This duality created where we don’t seem able to care about the victims of terrorism and care about the genocide that’s happening in Palestine at the same time, and both things have to be allowed to be true. You have to be allowed to care about 50,000 civilians dying, 17,000 of which are children, and care deeply about the victims of this awful terrorist attack."

On 26 September, American actress Jennifer Lawrence stated that what's happening in Gaza is "no less than a genocide" and calls it "unacceptable" during a press conference at the 2025 San Sebastián International Film Festival.

=== Religion ===
On 30 June 2026, the Presbyterian Church (USA) voted to recognize the war in Gaza as a genocide, passing 454–15 at the church's General Assembly in Milwaukee, Winsconsin. The church also called for United States Congress to impose an arms embargo against Israel and boycott Israeli products.

=== Sports ===
Multiple football supporters' groups have called for Israel to be banned from FIFA competitions. The Celtic ultras group the Green Brigade organised the "Show Israel the Red Card" campaign, writing: "Israel is committing genocide and ethnic cleansing; it is practising apartheid; and it is illegally occupying Palestinian territory." During the 2025 UEFA Champions League final, fans of French football club Paris Saint-Germain displayed a banner saying "Stop genocide in Gaza".

In September 2025, a coalition of 50 athletes including Cheick Doucouré, Nigel Pearson, Moeen Ali, and Khadijah Mellah signed a letter calling on UEFA for Israel's suspension from sports competitions. The letter stated, "sport cannot stand silent while athletes and civilians including children are indiscriminately killed en masse in Gaza". That month UEFA postponed a planned vote to exclude Israel from competitions after Donald Trump's peace proposal. In October 2025, 30 international human rights experts sent a letter to UEFA requesting they "move forward with an immediate and complete ban of Israeli football, including banning their national teams, club teams and players, from participating in UEFA competitions until justice and accountability is achieved for Palestine and all Palestinians." That month, a billboard campaign urging UEFA to expel Israel was launched by the group Game Over Israel. In November 2025 over 70 athletes including Paul Pogba signed a letter calling for UEFA to ban Israel and the Football Association of Ireland passed a resolution calling for Israel's suspension.

The BDS Movement accused the Israel–Premier Tech cycling team of sportswashing genocide and also criticised Union Cycliste Internationale for allowing the team to take part in Grand Tours. Several protests against the team occurred during the 2025 Tour de France and 2025 Vuelta a España. Stage 11 of the Vuelta finished without a winner due to protest at the finish line. The Government of Asturias called for Israel–Premier Tech to withdraw from the 2025 Vuelta and said that President Adrián Barbón would not attend stages in Asturias. The final stage of the Vuelta was also cancelled due to protest in Madrid. Spanish Prime Minister Pedro Sánchez voiced his support for the protestors. Sánchez later said that Israel should be banned from all international sports competitions.

In January 2026, American football player Azeez Al-Shaair was fined $11,593 by the NFL for wearing eye black with the message "stop the genocide" during a game.

In June 2026, Alex Haditaghi, businessman and owner of the Polish football club, Pogoń Szczecin, reportedly refused to negotiate two players of the club, Léo Borges and Dimitrios Keramitsis, to Maccabi Tel Aviv F.C., citing Israel's genocidal and "inhumane" actions in Gaza and compared the negotiation to dealing with a football club representing Nazi Germany.

=== Other notable figures ===
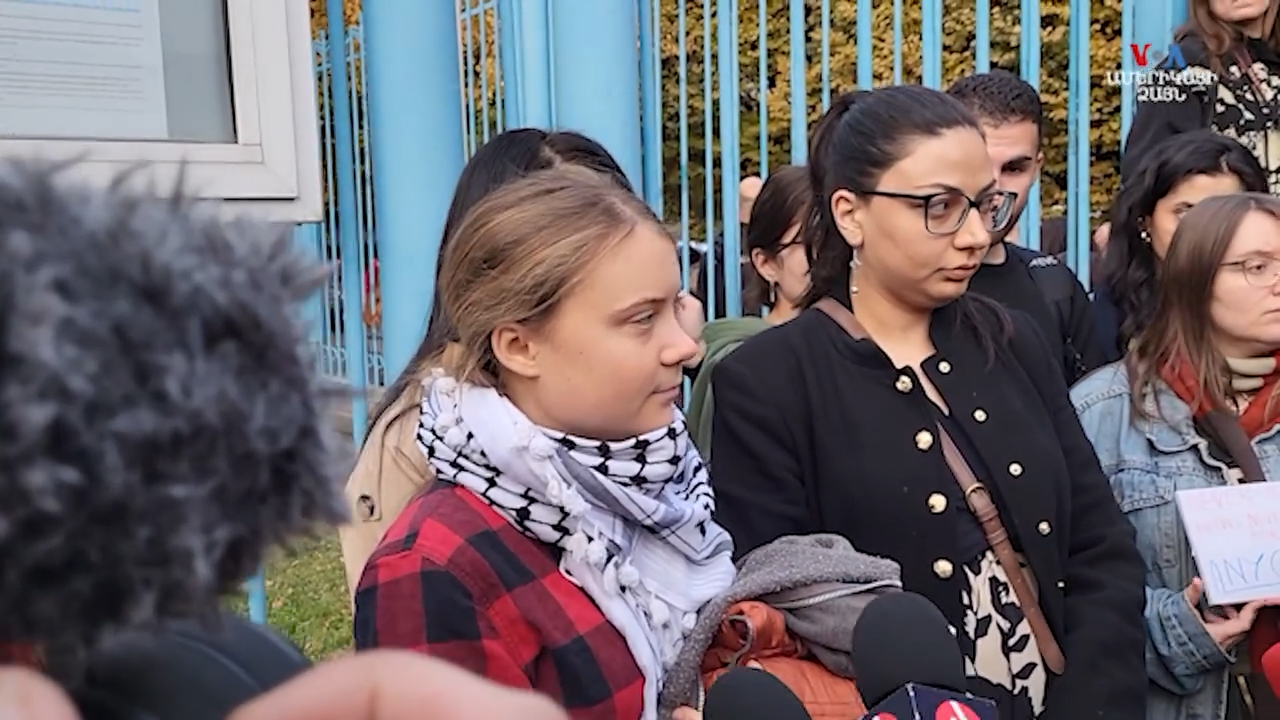
Greta Thunberg wearing a keffiyeh while protesting in front of the UN office in Yerevan against COP-29 taking place in Baku, Azerbaijan

The Nobel Peace Prize winner Malala Yousafzai said, "When we see alarming signs of genocide, we cannot wait to take decisive action. We must work together to urge our leaders to stop these war crimes and hold perpetrators to account." Another Nobel Peace Prize winner, Tawakkol Karman, said, "The world is silent in front of the genocide and the ethnic cleansing of the Palestinian people in Gaza."

In January 2024, The Times of Israel reporter Jeremy Sharon said that Israel's actions were defensive responses to Hamas, characterising calls for Gaza's destruction and other statements by Israeli officials (later found by the ICJ to be "incitement to genocide") as "intemperate comments of some of its political leaders".

In May 2025, children's YouTuber Ms. Rachel posted a video of her singing and dancing with Rahaf, a 3-year old double amputee who was medically evacuated from Gaza. She has continually used her platform to express her support for Palestinians in Gaza and frequently calls on leaders and celebrities to speak up. In an August 2025 interview with Democracy Now!, Ms. Rachel called the war a genocide.

Several podcasters have given their opinions on the matter. In March 2024, Joe Rogan remarked on his show, "They always say that they're only bombing Hamas and everybody else is a casualty, well if those guys are just unarmed civilians and they're walking alone, that's what they appear to be, and you just blast them from the sky with robots... If you can't talk about that, if you can't say that's real, then you're saying that genocide is okay as long as we're doing it." Another podcaster, Theo Von, interviewed US Vice President JD Vance on his show in June 2025, in which Von stated he believed the events in Gaza constituted a genocide. Vance responded by denying that Israel was committing a genocide, stating he didn't believe Israel was trying to kill every Palestinian. Similarly, a podcast popular among young American men, The Nelk Boys, hosted Benjamin Netanyahu on their show for an interview in July 2025. The episode received a lot of backlash, with leftist Twitch streamer Hasan Piker telling them directly, "You just basically presented someone who is a war criminal, someone who is doing a genocide, in a somewhat neutral light... and you can't be neutral when you have someone like Benjamin Netanyahu directly in an opportunity to talk to him. But that's what happened, so there is moral culpability here for you guys individually."

Jonathon Porritt, an environmentalist and former advisor to Charles III, said that there is "incontrovertible proof" that the UK is complicit in genocide. He was arrested for supporting Palestine Action after its proscription.

In September 2025, Bernie Sanders became the first US senator to conclude that Israel is committing a genocide in Gaza after he published a statement his website titled "It Is Genocide", highlighting that Israel has "waged an all-out war against the Palestinian people" and not against Hamas.

After going to Gaza, the writer Susan Abulhawa wrote, "Israel is committing the holocaust of our time."

== Media discourse ==
In January 2024, The Economist argued that Israel was targeting Hamas fighters, rather than killing Gazans for "being Palestinian", and therefore was not committing genocide. It said South Africa's case against Israel at the ICJ was politically motivated, weakens the legal definition of genocide, and diverts focus from the actual humanitarian crisis in Gaza. The Wall Street Journal also said the claims were politicised.

New York Times conservative columnist Bret Stephens stated that the devastation in Gaza, while immense, does not constitute genocide since it does not establish the specific intent required under international law.

A May 2025 editorial in The Guardian urged the US to end the war and endorsed the genocide charge against Israel, citing the civilian death toll, obliteration of civilian infrastructure, aid blockages, and Smotrich's threats to destroy all of Gaza.

In September 2025, the UN's Independent International Commission of Inquiry on the Occupied Palestinian Territory published a report saying Israel is committing genocide in Gaza. In his analysis, BBC international editor Jeremy Bowen said the report, which came from several of Israel's Western and Middle Eastern allies, would "feed into the growing international condemnation" of Israel's war conduct. In The Independent, chief international correspondent Bel Trew said that only a court can rule on whether genocide has been committed but that this would "take a decade".

Paul Nuki, writing in The Daily Telegraph, said the report would have a "profound impact" on whether governments apply sanctions to Israel. Jake Wallis Simons, in the same paper, said the report undermines the credibility of the UN. International law scholar Triestino Mariniello said in The Palestine Chronicle that the report had "strong persuasive value" even if it was not legally binding.

=== Media complicity ===
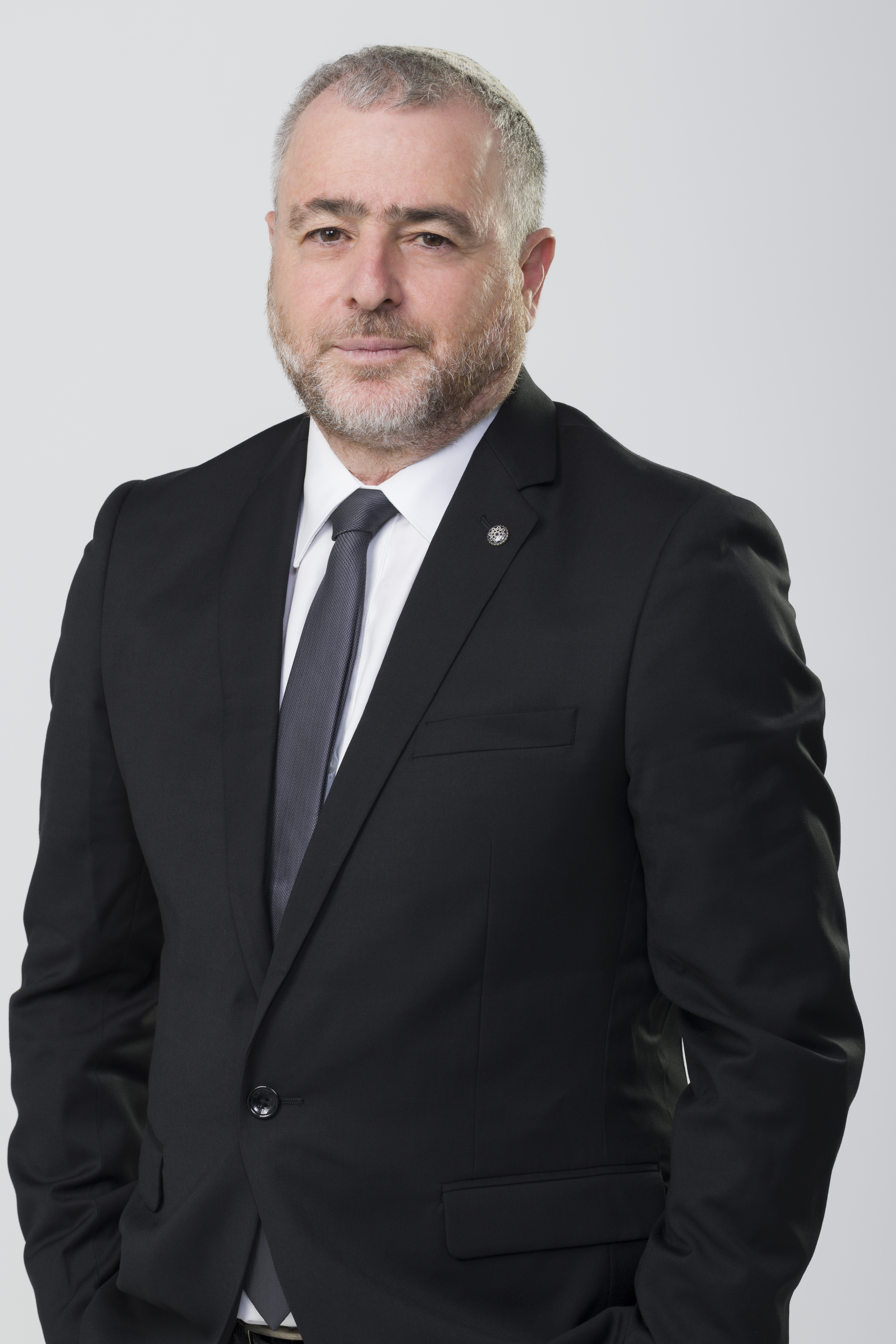
Shimon Riklin of Channel 14 who has been cited as an example of extreme rhetoric in Israeli media.

Scholars, journalists, media analysts, and human rights advocates have accused various media outlets, mainly western, of complicity in the genocide of Palestinians in Gaza through media imperialism. Others have situated the biases of Western media outlets within a long history of downplaying and excusing the oppression of Palestinians. According to a report published by the Muslim Council of Britain's Centre for Media Monitoring analysing the language used in coverage of the Israeli assault on Gaza, "occupied territories" appeared more often in Al Jazeera English's coverage than in all US or UK news outlets combined, and that emotive language was 11 times more likely to be used in descriptions of Israeli victims than of Palestinian victims.

Several Israeli media outlets have been accused of incitement to genocide. In September 2024, Zulat for Equality and Human Rights and two other Israeli organisations compiled a list of statements made on Channel 14, which included over 50 advocating for genocide against Palestinians and more than 150 calling for or supporting war crimes and crimes against humanity, and submitted it to Israel's Attorney General. The channel frequently referred to Gazan civilians as "terrorists" and "legitimate targets" in its broadcasts and on social media, with its website displaying a statistic labeled "the number of terrorists we've eliminated", reflecting the total number of Palestinians reported killed by Gaza's Health Ministry. Shimon Riklin, a Channel 14 anchor, publicly advocated for Israel to commit more war crimes. This rhetoric has been referenced in South Africa's genocide case against Israel at the International Court of Justice. In May 2025, the Israeli organizations petitioned the High Court of Justice of Israel, alleging that Channel 14 has repeatedly aired statements amounting to incitement to genocide and becoming "an engine of incitement to war crimes, violence, and racism." The petition claims that law enforcement bodies have failed to investigate despite months of documented complaints, citing more than 250 examples of on-air calls for mass killing or destruction in Gaza.

The New York Times has been accused of complicity in genocide for perceived bias in its coverage of the Gaza war. On 9 November 2023, protestors staged a sit-in at the Times office and distributed copies of the protest publication The New York War Crimes that accused the Times of "complicity in laundering genocide." On 14 March 2024, protesters blocked access to the offices of The New York Times, accusing the paper of complicity in genocide. In July 2025, a group of writers released a dossier accusing the paper of employing nearly two dozen journalists with extensive pro-Israel bias. In October 2025, more than 300 public figures including Rashida Tlaib, Chelsea Manning, Gabor Maté, and Indya Moore signed a letter titled "Genocide is not a matter of opinion" to boycott The New York Times opinion section until three demands have been met. The demands are to address the anti-Palestinian bias, retract its reports about sexual violence during the October 7 attacks and calling for a U.S. arms embargo against Israel.

Sultany highlights that, despite a preponderance of Israeli statements that amount to incitement to genocide, mainstream commentary has portrayed the destruction of Gaza as "an incidental outcome of urban warfare rather than the predictable outcome of a policy". Throughout the summer of 2025, multiple commentators noticed a shift in the media's coverage of Gaza, with some suggesting this being a result of the worsening famine and continued pressure from activists.

German media outlets have been accused of enabling genocide for their justification of Israel's targeting of journalists. German tabloid Bild referred to Anas Al-Sharif as a "terrorist disguised as journalist" after his assassination. Bild also accused Anas Zayed Fteiha, a photojournalist working for Turkey's Anadolu Agency, of staging his photos of the Gaza Strip famine. German media sites have also published misinformation, including the Hamas baby beheading hoax, without subsequent correction. The Al Jazeera Media Institute said "German media outlets generally echo Israeli propaganda and treat it as sacred." An analysis published by Jacobin found that 43% of headlines in German media came from Israeli sources while only 5% came from Palestinians. German sociologist Jürgen Mackert wrote that the German media's coverage of the genocide shows "a deeply-rooted settler colonial mindset in Germany's institutions and organisations". The Lemkin Institute for Genocide Prevention wrote that German media has "abandoned their journalistic responsibilities ... effectively becoming the Israeli government’s most loyal mouthpiece."

== Public opinion ==
=== Canada and the United States ===
A March 2025 poll by the Brookings Institution found that 12% of Americans thought that Israeli actions constituted genocide and 32% thought they were war crimes "akin to genocide". In June 2025, according to a Léger survey, 49% of Canadians and 38% of Americans agreed that "Israel is committing genocide in the Gaza Strip". A Gallup poll taken in July 2025 found that U.S. approval of Israel's military actions in Gaza had dropped to 32%.

In an August 2025 Economist/YouGov poll for the United States, 43% of the 1,702 respondents said they believed that Israel is "committing genocide against Palestinian civilians", 28% disagreed, and 29% were uncertain. That same month, a poll conducted by Quinnipiac University since November 2023, reported that out of 1,220 voters, 50% of them believed that Israel is committing genocide in Gaza, with 77% of Democrats, 51% of independents, and 20% of Republicans believing so.

A September 2025 poll conducted by The Washington Post taken by 815 American Jews found that 39% of them believed that Israel is conducting a genocide in Gaza while 51% of them did not. The poll also showed that 61% of the respondents said that Israel is committing war crimes in Gaza while 29% denied it. In addition, 59% said that Israel is not doing enough to ensure food aid reaches to Gaza, as opposed to the 30% who claiming that it is enough.

=== Europe ===
According to a public opinion poll by YouGov plc released in April 2024, 46% of Swedes, 43% of Belgians, 34% of French, and 33% of Germans agreed that Israel is committing genocide against Palestinians in Gaza. In a German poll from June 2025, 73% said that there was "some truth" to the claim that Israel was committing genocide.

According to a survey by the Elcano Royal Institute released in May 2024, 71% of Spaniards considered Israel's actions to be genocide. In a July 2025 survey from Elcano, 82% of Spaniards said Israel was committing genocide in Gaza and 70% wanted the EU to sanction Israel. In an Italian Tecnè poll published in June 2025, 50% of respondents said Israel's military operation in Gaza "can be defined as genocide". Only 15% called Israel's response proportionate.

In a June 2025 British poll, 55% opposed Israel's war on Gaza, of whom 82% believed Israel was committing genocide.

In an August 2025 poll conducted by Ipsos, Polish newspaper Rzeczpospolia reported that out of the 1,200 respondents, 70% of Poles say that Israel is committing a genocide in Gaza, with 43% of the respondents "strongly agree" with the label of genocide to Israel's actions in Gaza. A poll was also conducted the same month in Germany by the German Institute for Global and Area Studies, where of 1,050 respondents 68% agreed that Palestinian militant groups committed war crimes on 7 October 2023, 65% agreed that the Israeli army is committing war crimes and crimes against humanity in Gaza, and 59% agreed that Israel's military actions in Gaza amount to genocide against the Palestinians (with 21% of respondents disagreeing, and 20% responding that they were unsure).

In September 2025, a survey conducted by YouGov found that 62% of Germans believed that Israel is committing a genocide in Gaza while 17% disagreed. The survey also showed that 71% for both the Social Democratic Party of Germany and The Greens respectively, 79% of Die Linke, 60% of the CDU/CSU, and 56% of the Alternative for Germany believed that Israel is perpetrating a genocide in Gaza.

=== Israel ===
Israel is deteriorating horribly. The most important thing, and you mentioned it, is how unanimous it is. It's not only the right-wingers. You cannot even show some empathy to Gaza, to the suffering of Gaza, which Israel doesn't see at all. The average Israeli saw nothing [of what has unfolded in] Gaza. Only the soldiers there see it. The bravery, the sacrifice, the hostages and families, this is shown nonstop, but not a single image of the suffering of two million people in Gaza. I think it's the darkest time of Israel, maybe ever.

— Israeli author Gideon Levy, January 2024

The Lemkin Institute for Genocide Prevention states that "the vast majority of Israelis agree with...[Israel's] plan and clearly will support anything to see it realized – from apartheid to extermination."

A June 2025 poll by the Hebrew University of Jerusalem found that 64% of Israelis largely agreed with the statement "there are no innocent people in Gaza".

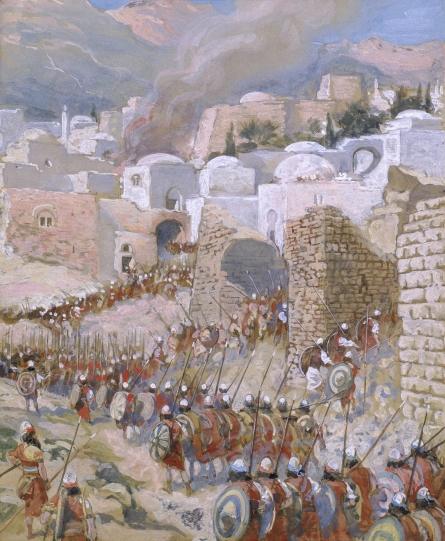
The Taking of Jericho, c. 1896–1902, by James Tissot.

A January 2024 Tel Aviv University poll of Israeli Jews found that 51% believed the IDF was using an appropriate amount of force in Gaza and 43% believed it was not using enough.

In a February 2024 Israel Democracy Institute survey of Israelis, 68% of Jewish respondents supported preventing all international aid from entering Gaza, (Note: Broken down by political identity: 39% among left-wing Jewish Israelis; 51.5% among centrist Jewish Israelis; 80% among right-wing Jewish Israelis) and 55% of Jewish respondents opposed ending the war.

A March 2025 poll of Israeli Jews found that 82% supported the forced expulsion of Gaza residents; 47% responded affirmatively to the question: "When conquering an enemy city, should the IDF act like the Israelites led by Joshua when they conquered Jericho, that is, kill all its inhabitants?" (Note: As detailed in the Book of Joshua, when the city of Jericho was conquered, the ancient Israelites "utterly destroyed all that was in the city, both man and woman, both young and old, and ox, and sheep, and ass, with the edge of the sword.") In July 2025, a poll conducted by the Viterbi Family Center for Public Opinion and Policy Research at the Israel Democracy Institute poll found that 79% of Israeli Jews were "not so troubled" or "not troubled at all" by reports of famine and suffering in Gaza.

An August 2025 poll conducted by aChord, a research group from the Hebrew University of Jerusalem, found that 76% of Israeli Jews agree or partially agree that "there are no innocents in Gaza".

== Claims of antisemitism ==
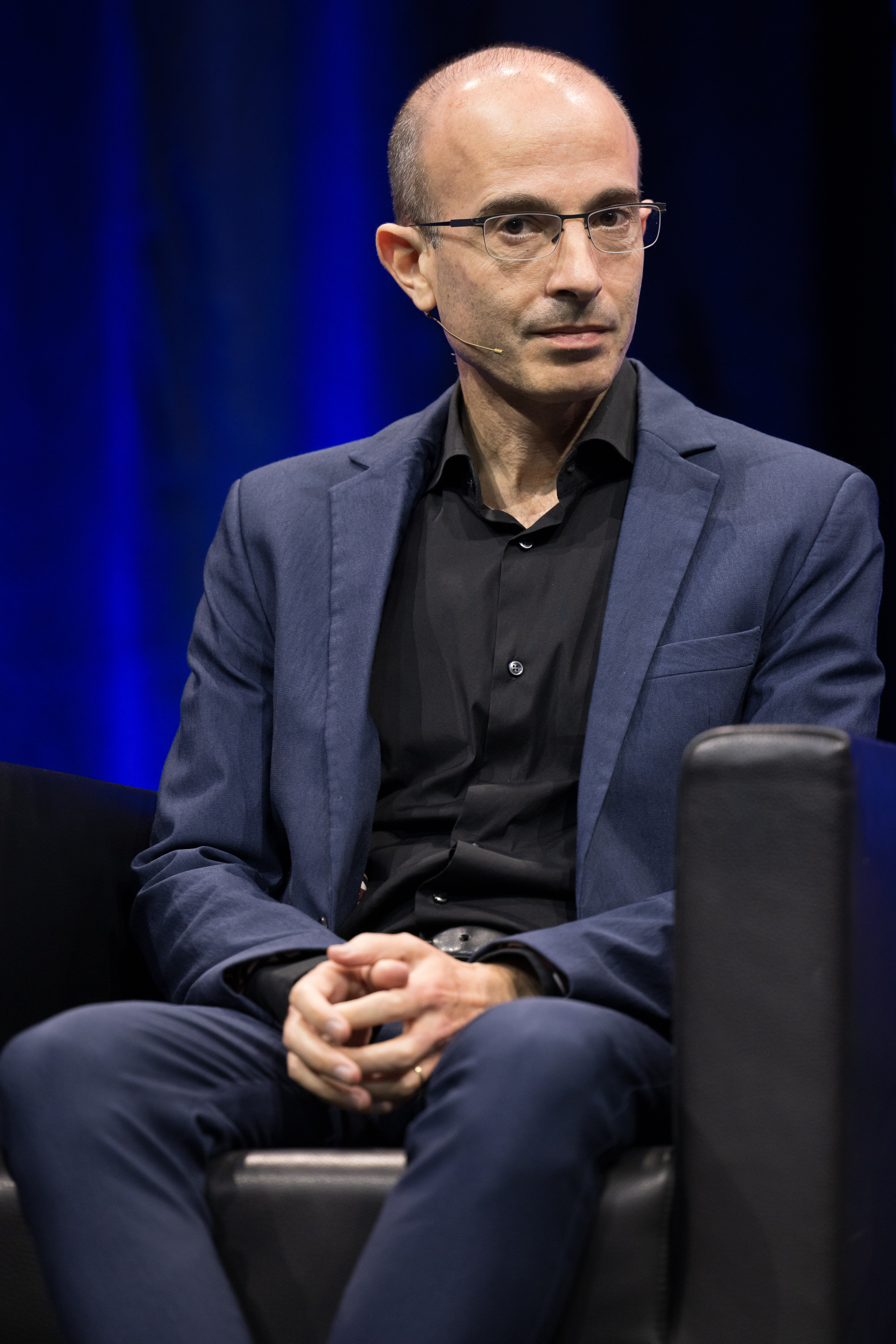
Yuval Noah Harari in October 2024, who dismissed the accusation of genocide against Israel as "antisemitic propaganda".

Israeli ministers have responded to the ICJ's genocide ruling by accusing the court of "antisemitic bias". Netanyahu has frequently compared "accusations that Israel's war is causing starvation in Gaza or that the war is genocidal" to blood libel. Sergey Brin, co-founder of Google, accused the UN of being "transparently antisemitic".

In May 2024, the analyst Frida Ghitis wrote for CNN that, although Israel could have done more to reduce civilian casualties in Gaza, it was "unconscionable" to describe Israel's actions as genocide. She also wrote that such accusations are a modern form of antisemitism that echo medieval anti-Jewish blood libels. In October 2024, the Israeli historian Yuval Noah Harari also dismissed the genocide allegations as antisemitic propaganda.

Israeli historian Tom Segev and EU foreign policy chief Josep Borrell have said comments like Netanyahu's are intended to deflect blame or are made for political ends. Academic Raz Segal and writer Antony Lerman have said this is weaponisation of antisemitism, intended to shield Israel from such allegations.

Writing in Declassified UK, Lerman said claims of antisemitism were being echoed by some of Israel's supporters. He said Israeli officials deployed "weaponised antisemitism to deflect criticism" and that "using past experience of anti-Jewish persecution to neutralise criticism of, and generate sympathy for, the Jewish state [...] is decades old." Antisemitism scholar Matthew Bolton suggests that investigating potential genocidal acts is not inherently antisemitic, but that swiftly embracing the genocide label for Israel's actions—relying on mistranslated or incomplete statements rather than substantive military evidence, and previously utilised by anti-Israel movements—raises questions about the objectivity of analysis.

In December 2024, citing Ireland's decision to join South Africa's genocide case, Netanyahu ordered the closure of Israel's embassy in Ireland and Foreign Minister Gideon Sa'ar accused Taoiseach Simon Harris of antisemitism. Harris said that Netanyahu was using the closure as "a ploy to distract attention from the thousands of children killed by his armed forces in Gaza".

== See also ==
- Academic and legal responses to the Gaza genocide
- Censorship of pro-Palestinian expression in German culture
- Gaza genocide denial
- German support for Israel in the Gaza war
- Intent and incitement in the Gaza genocide
- List of The New York Times controversies
- Palestinian sports during the Israeli invasion of the Gaza Strip
