= List of The New York Times controversies =

Controversies involving the New York City-based newspaper

The New York Times has been involved in many controversies since its founding in 1851. It is one of the largest newspapers in the United States and the world, and is considered to have worldwide influence and readership. Thousands of writers have contributed to New York Times' materials. Notably, it has been accused of antisemitism, bias, and playing a notable role in influencing the Iraq War due to its misleading coverage of Saddam Hussein.

== Pre-21st century ==
=== Russian Revolution, 1917–1920 ===
In 1920, Walter Lippmann and Charles Merz investigated the coverage of the Russian Revolution by The New York Times from 1917 to 1920. Their findings, published as "A Test of the News", in a supplement of The New Republic, concluded that The New York Times' reporting was biased and inaccurate, adding that the newspaper's news stories were not based on facts but "were determined by the hopes of the men who made up the news organizations." Lippmann and Merz alleged that the newspaper referred to events that had not taken place and atrocities that had not occurred, and that it reported at least 91 times that the Bolshevik regime was on the verge of collapse. "The news about Russia is an example of what people wanted to see, not what happened," Lippmann and Merz wrote. "The main censor and the main propagandist was the hope and fear in the minds of reporters and editors."

=== Coverage of the Holodomor ===
The New York Times was criticized for the work of reporter Walter Duranty, who served as its Moscow bureau chief from 1922 through 1936. Duranty wrote a series of stories in 1931 on the Soviet Union and won a Pulitzer Prize for his work at that time; however, he has been criticized for denying widespread famine, particularly the Holodomor, the Ukrainian famine in the 1930s.

In 2003, after the Pulitzer Board began a renewed inquiry, the Times hired Mark von Hagen, professor of Russian history at Columbia University, to review Duranty's work. Von Hagen found Duranty's reports to be unbalanced and uncritical, and that they far too often gave voice to Stalinist propaganda. In comments to the press, he stated, "For the sake of The New York Times' honor, they should take the prize away."

=== Coverage of the Holocaust ===
The Times has been criticized for its coverage of the Holocaust. According to the 2005 book Buried by the Times by Laurel Leff, it buried in the back pages of the paper stories about the genocide of European Jews, and avoided mentions of Jewish victims of persecutions, deportations, and death camps. Between 1939 and 1945, the Times published more than 23,000 front-page stories—half of which were about World War II—and only 26 were about the Holocaust. In the documentary Reporting on The Times: How the paper of record ignored the Holocaust, past editors of the newspaper stated that there was a conscious decision to bury the paper's Holocaust coverage.

Various motivations have been attributed to the decision to bury and minimize the Holocaust, all of which are linked to the Times' publisher at the time, Arthur Hays Sulzberger, who was Jewish. Some claim that Sulzberger feared the Times would be "viewed as a special pleader for the Jews'"—at a time when anti-Semitism was relatively common in the United States—if the Holocaust was given more prominent coverage. Others point to Sulzberger's anti-Zionist views as a stronger motive. A Reform Jew and an enthusiastic supporter of the American Council for Judaism, both of which heavily emphasize anti-Zionism, Sulzberger believed European Jews were partially responsible for their own demise in the Holocaust. Not even a personal visit to a concentration camp was enough to shake this conviction. In a 1946 speech, less than one year after his visit to a concentration camp, Sulzberger stated, "'[i]t is my judgment that thousands dead might now be alive' if 'the Zionists' had put 'less emphasis on statehood.'" In another speech that same year, Sulzberger downplayed the plight of displaced Jews, stating "they were 'but a minor percentage of the total of displaced persons' and therefore should not be receiving so much attention."

In September 1996, the Times released a statement admitting to "underplaying the Holocaust while it was taking place" and that "[c]lippings from the paper show that the criticism is valid."

=== 1979 sex discrimination settlement ===
In November 1979, a federal court gave approval to a settlement between The New York Times and a group of female Times employees who sued alleging sex discrimination. The settlement agreement was effective for a four-year period beginning in January 1979; under the agreement, the company amended existing equal opportunity targets and paid $350,000 in compensation and attorneys' fees to the plaintiffs, but was not required to "pay new or retroactive salary increases, make immediate promotions, revoke past employment practices or substantially change its present affirmative-action programs." James C. Goodale, the executive vice president of the New York Times Company, said that the settlement "completely vindicates The Times of any charge or hint of unfair employment practices."

=== Los Alamos investigation ===
In 1999, The New York Times ran a series of stories about the alleged theft of classified documents from Los Alamos National Lab in New Mexico. The prime suspect, Taiwan-born U.S. citizen Wen Ho Lee, had his name leaked to The New York Times by U.S. Energy Department officials. Lee was indicted on 59 counts and jailed in solitary confinement for 278 days until he accepted a plea bargain from the government. The alleged security breach became a catalyst for the creation of the National Nuclear Security Administration (NNSA). Lee was released after the government failed to prove its case.

President Bill Clinton issued a public apology to Dr. Lee over his treatment. The federal judge in charge of the case, James Aubrey Parker, remarked that "top decision makers in the executive branch... have embarrassed our entire nation and each of us who is a citizen." Lee filed a lawsuit under the Privacy Act alleging that officials had leaked false and incriminating information to the press before charges were filed. Lee's lawsuit was settled in 2006, just before the U.S. Supreme Court was to decide whether to hear the case. The issues resembled those in the Plame affair criminal investigation, during which The New York Times reporter Judith Miller spent two-and-a-half months in jail rather than reveal her government source.

== Alleged biases ==
=== Corporate-influence concerns ===
In their book Manufacturing Consent (1988), Edward S. Herman and Noam Chomsky analyze major U.S. media outlets, with an emphasis on The Times. They believe that a bias exists which is neither liberal nor conservative in nature, but aligned towards the interests of corporations, which own most of these media outlets and also provide the majority of their advertising revenue. The authors explain that this bias functions in all sorts of ways:

"by selection of topics, by distribution of concerns, by emphasis and framing of issues, by filtering of information, by bounding of debate within certain limits. They determine, they select, they shape, they control, they restrict – in order to serve the interests of dominant, elite groups in the society."

Chomsky and Herman also touch on the importance of this perceived bias in The Times:

"history is what appears in The New York Times archives; the place where people will go to find out what happened is The New York Times. Therefore it's extremely important if history is going to be shaped in an appropriate way, that certain things appear, certain things not appear, certain questions be asked, other questions be ignored, and that issues be framed in a particular fashion."

In the 2018 documentary Fahrenheit 11/9, director Michael Moore accuses The Times of leading liberal establishment newspapers in becoming "more like Republicans" starting in the Clinton presidency. He argues The Times adopted war hawk positions, minimized social movements like the 2011 Occupy Wall Street protests, defended the Wall Street bailout, and undermined the Bernie Sanders 2016 presidential campaign because its progressive economic policies threatened the liberal establishment.

==== Fossil fuel advertising ====
An investigation by The Intercept, The Nation, and DeSmog found that The New York Times is one of the leading media outlets that publishes advertising for the fossil fuel industry. Journalists who cover climate change for the Times are concerned that conflicts of interest with the companies and industries that caused climate change and obstructed action will reduce the credibility of their reporting on climate change and cause readers to downplay the climate crisis.

=== Coverage of Israel and Palestine ===
A 2003 study in the Harvard International Journal of Press/Politics concluded that The New York Times' reporting was more favorable to Israelis than to Palestinians. A 2002 study published in the journal Journalism examined Middle East coverage of the Second Intifada over a one-month period in The New York Times, The Washington Post, and the Chicago Tribune. The study authors said that the Times was "the most slanted in a pro-Israeli direction" with a bias "reflected... in its use of headlines, photographs, graphics, sourcing practices, and lead paragraphs." A Media, War & Conflict study based on a quantitative analysis of the use of active and passive voice and of the sentiment of the language used during the first and second Palestinian intifadas found that the paper's coverage of the events was disproportionately anti-Palestinian and that such bias worsened from the First Intifada to the Second.

A 2012 Joan Shorenstein Center on the Press, Politics and Public Policy study of The Times concluded that the paper's "narrative of Israel stayed largely in the journalistic 'middle' throughout the decades but the 'middle' changed because of many factors, including a growing awareness of the situation of the Palestinians who were themselves just developing a nationalist consciousness." That, it found, led supporters of Israel to see the paper as tilted toward Palestinians.

==== Gaza war coverage ====
"Language makes genocide justifiable. A reason why we are still being bombed after 243 days is because of The New York Times and most Western media."

— Hossam Shabat, a Palestinian journalist accused without evidence of being a member of Hamas and killed in an Israeli airstrike 24 March 2025

In November 2023, contributor Mona Chalabi criticized the paper for paying less attention to Palestinian deaths than Israeli deaths, and alleged that it treats its Arab staff less well than its Jewish staff, speculating that some of the latter may have gone on free government-funded trips to Israel in their youth through Birthright Israel, which she said should raise questions about their ability to be objective about Israel.

Writers and editors have left the newspaper due to its coverage of events in Gaza. Signatories of the Writers Against the War on Gaza letter, an open letter criticising the Gaza genocide in the course of the Gaza war, include award-winning journalist Jazmine Hughes, who resigned from her position at The New York Times shortly after signing the letter, as well as Jamie Lauren Keiles, who announced that he would no longer contribute to the Times after the letter was released. The newspaper said that their actions were a "violation of The Times's policy on public protest". Writers Against the War on Gaza organized a parody paper as agitprop, The New York (War) Crimes, discussing alleged unbalanced coverage. Code Pink protested the paper's coverage in April 2025, citing the open letter.

According to The Intercept, an April 2024 internal memo by Susan Wessling and Philip Pan reportedly prohibited journalists covering the war from using the words "genocide" and "ethnic cleansing" in their reporting.

A study by Edieal Pinker of the Yale School of Management, which reviewed more than 1,500 news articles from October 7, 2023, to June 7, 2024, found "a framing that assigns near-exclusive agency and responsibility to Israel while diminishing Hamas's role in sustaining the conflict."

In May 2025, The New York Times printed the suggestion from the pro-Israel advocacy group StopAntisemitism that Ms. Rachel was being funded by Hamas after she expressed concern for children in Gaza. Ms. Rachel wrote to The New York Times that "This accusation is not only absurd, it's patently false". Media analyst Adam H. Johnson criticized The New York Times for "relay[ing] [StopAntisemitism's] allegation... as a serious allegation that merited response, rather than as the baseless rantings of an online conspiracy theorist."

In September 2026, shareholders filed a lawsuit requesting that the Times release internal records regarding decisions about their Gaza coverage, amid claims that the Times violated its own editorial policies in its coverage. In particular it claims that bias concerns were not addressed and not brought to the attention of the leadership, and when it was, appropriate action was not taken. The suit is in partial response to the lack of action by the Times for a response to the National Jewish Advocacy Center (NJAC), request on May 29 to the May 11 Nicholas Kristof column titled "The Silence That Meets the Rape of Palestinians" .

===== "Screams Without Words" =====
The accuracy of the Times' coverage of reported atrocities during the October 7 attacks in a December 2023 investigative piece entitled "Screams Without Words" has been the subject of criticism by The Intercept for inaccuracies and poor fact checking. On 29 April 2024, more than 50 tenured journalism US university professors and scholars called for a thorough external review into the reporting, editorial procedures and overall publication process behind "Screams Without Words".

===== Protest and boycott =====
The New York Times Building has been a site of protest action during the Gaza war and genocide, including a November 2023 sit-in demanding that The Times' editorial board publicly call for a ceasefire and accusing the media company of "complicity in laundering genocide," a February 29, 2024, protest and press conference following the release of The Intercept's critical investigation into the NYT "Screams Without Words" exposé, and an action on July 30, 2025, in which protesters spray-painted "NYT Lies, Gaza dies" on the building's glass facade. On December 11, 2023, a global strike was called in order to apply pressure for a ceasefire in the Gaza Strip, with activists encouraging participants to refrain from going to work, school, or making any purchases. Supporters of the strike blocked the entrance of The New York Times Building. Protesters blocked The New York Times' distribution center March 14, 2024 and executive editor Joseph Kahn's residence was splattered with red paint on August 25, 2025.

Photographer Nan Goldin cancelled a project with the Times due to its "complicity with Israel." The collective Writers Against the War on Gaza, which publishes the mock publication The New York War Crimes, has been associated with protests against The New York Times.

On October 27, 2025, 300 writers—including scholars, journalists, and public intellectuals—pledged to boycott The New York Times opinion page and withhold contributions to the paper in protest of what they describe as its complicity in the Gaza genocide, demanding 1) a review of anti-Palestinian bias in the newsroom, 2) a retraction of "Screams Without Words", and 3) a call from the Editorial Board for a US arms embargo on Israel. Among the initial signatories, about 150 had previously contributed to the Times.

In November 2025, Ms. Rachel announced that she was "unsubscribing from The New York Times because of its biased and dehumanizing coverage of Palestinians and Palestine, and its failure to uphold journalistic integrity."

=== Alleged antisemitism ===
On April 25, 2019, the Times international print edition published a cartoon, drawn by Portuguese cartoonist António Moreira Antunes, featuring U.S. President Donald Trump and Israeli Prime Minister Benjamin Netanyahu. Trump was shown wearing a kippah and Netanyahu was displayed as Trump's dog wearing a collar with the Star of David. The Israeli edition of the newspaper was published at the end of Passover. After criticism from public and religious figures, the Times affirmed it used antisemitic tropes. On April 28 The Times issued an apology. On May 1, 2019, the Times announced that the editor who published the cartoon, whose name has never been released, would be "disciplined." The Times also announced the cancellation of its contract with the syndicate that provided the cartoon, and that the Times would "update its bias training to include a focus on anti-Semitism." On June 10, 2019, citing the antisemitic cartoon, the Times announced its international edition was ending the publication of daily political cartoons.

On August 22, 2019, a politics desk editor at the Times, Tom Wright-Piersanti, was revealed to have posted several antisemitic tweets while working at another outlet before joining the Times. He had posted several anti-Indian tweets as well. His tweets included phrases such as "Crappy Jew Year", and "Jew police." The Times reconsidered his future, but ultimately decided to continue his employment.

On September 23, 2021, an article written by reporter Catie Edmondson stated that Representative Alexandria Ocasio-Cortez had tearfully changed her vote from "no" to "present" on a vote to fund the Iron Dome because of the pressure exerted on Ocasio-Cortez by "influential lobbyists and rabbis". The claim was criticized on the grounds that discussion of "influential rabbis" echoed antisemitic tropes, with critics asking which rabbis were known to have influence on Ocasio-Cortez; claiming that Edmondson had attributed motives to Ocasio-Cortez without any factual basis; and that one could support the Iron Dome, a defensive installment that protects civilians, if one had been influenced by lobbyists or rabbis. Representative Ritchie Torres called Edmondson's article an example of "casual antisemitism". The phrase "influential rabbis" was stealth-edited out of the online version of the story but appeared in print.

=== Iran coverage ===
A 2015 study claimed that The New York Times fed into an overarching tendency towards national bias. During the Iranian nuclear crisis, the newspaper minimized the "negative processes" of the United States while overemphasizing similar processes of Iran. This tendency was shared by other papers such as The Guardian, Tehran Times, and the Fars News Agency, while Xinhua News Agency was found to be more neutral while at the same time mimicking the foreign policy of the People's Republic of China.

=== Anti-transgender coverage ===
The New York Times' reporting on transgender issues has been criticized by the American Academy of Pediatrics, World Professional Association for Transgender Health (WPATH), Endocrine Society, and other major organizations as well as publication outlets.

In 2022, an article titled "The Battle Over Gender Therapy" questioned whether children should have any access to gender therapy and consulted medical experts that were already biased towards that stance. The story received condemnations for "gatekeeping" recommendations on medical care for transgender youth. A few months later, the Times released its own privately commissioned survey on puberty blockers, which did not examine scientific and medical studies; WPATH responded by releasing its own statement that highlighted how the hired analyst was a physician with no background or experience in the field of transgender health.

In February 2023, nearly 1,000 current and former Times writers and contributors wrote an open letter addressed to Philip B. Corbet, accusing the paper of publishing biased articles against transgender, non-binary, and gender nonconforming people, some of which have been cited in amicus briefs such as one defending Alabama's Vulnerable Child Compassion and Protection Act. Contributors alleged that "the Times has in recent years treated gender diversity with an eerily familiar mix of pseudoscience and euphemistic, charged language, while publishing reporting on trans children that omits relevant information about its sources." Tens of thousands of subscribers and readers also signed the letter. One example cited was the use of the term "patient zero" to describe a trans child seeking transgender healthcare. Hundreds of high-profile figures, including Roxane Gay, Jenna Wortham, Dave Itzkoff, Ed Yong, Chelsea Manning, Sarah Schulman, Jia Tolentino, Lena Dunham, Kate Zambreno, Gabrielle Union, Judd Apatow, Tommy Dorfman, and Cynthia Nixon, signed the letter.

A second letter was released the same day. This letter included over 100 LGBTQ and civil rights groups, including GLAAD, the Human Rights Campaign, and PFLAG; it expressed support for the letter from contributors and accused the Times of publishing "fringe theories" and "dangerous inaccuracies." As a continued effort from this statement, a digital billboard truck from GLAAD was situated outside of the Times's headquarters, featuring messages such as "Dear New York Times: Stop Questioning Trans People's Right to Exist & Access to Medical Care".

Within a day the Times issued a response, saying that "Our journalism strives to explore, interrogate and reflect the experiences, ideas and debates in society—to help readers understand them. Our reporting did exactly that and we're proud of it." The next day, the Times published an op-ed piece by TERF activist Pamela Paul entitled "In defense of J. K. Rowling." The same day, an internal memo was sent by the editors, saying that "Our coverage of transgender issues, including the specific pieces singled out for attack, is important, deeply reported, and sensitively written. We do not welcome, and will not tolerate, participation by Times journalists in protests organized by advocacy groups or attacks on colleagues on social media and other public forums."

Recounting the letter campaign and other events, in 2025 GLAAD published an overview of what they saw as bias and inaccuracies within The New York Times' coverage of transgender people. They cited a number of events and editorial decisions at the paper, e.g., that:

The Times has covered Utah's legislative attacks against the transgender community in more than half a dozen stories, but did not cover the Utah legislature's study finding that transgender health care benefits trans youth. ... The Times obscures sources' identities, leading readers to believe a source is simply an 'everyday person,' when they in fact are working directly with anti-trans activists and extremist organizations. ... Multiple families have come forward to express their regret in speaking with the Times and call out the fact that their personal stories were spun and twisted[.]

=== Coverage of Elon Musk and his companies ===
The New York Times coverage of businessman Elon Musk and his companies has been the source of controversy. Times reports on Twitter and on Tesla, Inc. have been described as "aggressive". An Associated Press report claimed that Musk "despised" the Times, causing The New York Times to lose the verification check mark of its Twitter account for several months.

In June 2024, the Times reported on a remote Amazon tribe that received access to the internet due to Musk's Starlink satellite service. Global headlines reported that the tribe had become hooked on the internet, with pornography becoming a problem. In response, the Times claimed that the article had been misrepresented.

== 2000s ==
=== Anthrax attacks ===
In 2002, The New York Times columnist Nicholas Kristof wrote a series of columns indirectly suggesting that Steven Hatfill, a former U.S. Army germ warfare researcher named as a "person of interest" by the FBI, might be a "likely culprit" in the 2001 anthrax attacks. Hatfill was never charged with any crime. In 2004, Hatfill sued The New York Times and Kristof for libel, claiming defamation and intentional infliction of emotional distress. After years of proceedings, the case was dismissed in 2007, and the dismissal was upheld on appeal. In 2008, the case was appealed to the U.S. Supreme Court which refused to grant certiorari, effectively leaving the dismissal in place. The basis for the dismissal was that Hatfill was a "public figure" and he had not proved malice on the part of The New York Times.

=== Plagiarism by Jayson Blair ===
In 2003, The New York Times admitted that Jayson Blair, one of its reporters, had committed repeated journalistic fraud over a span of several years. Blair immediately resigned following the incident. Questions of affirmative action in journalism were also raised, since Blair is African American. Jonathan Landman, Blair's editor, said he felt that Blair's race played a large part in Blair being promoted in 2001 to a full-time staffer. The paper's top two editors—Howell Raines, the executive editor, and Gerald M. Boyd, the managing editor—resigned their posts following the incident.

=== Iraq War coverage by Judith Miller ===
==== Nuclear weapons misinformation ====
Judith Miller wrote a series of prominently displayed articles suggesting Iraqi president Saddam Hussein was sourcing materials that could be used to make nuclear weapons. Chief among these was a front-page article reporting Iraq's purchase of aluminum tubes "which American officials believe[d] were intended as components of centrifuges to enrich uranium." According to author Michael Massing, the aluminum tubes—which were mentioned in Secretary of State Colin Powell's speech to the United Nations—became "a key prop in the administration's case for war, and the Times played a critical part in legitimizing it." The reporting on the aluminum tubes, and reliance on anti-Saddam campaigner Ahmed Chalabi as a source, soon became a leading critique of the Times' coverage leading up to the 2003 invasion of Iraq. In 2004, the Times published an editorial admitting that it uncritically propagated the claims of their intelligence sources, and contributed to an overall "pattern of misinformation" related to Iraq's nuclear ambitions.

==== Valerie Plame affair ====
In October 2005, Judith Miller was released from prison after 85 days, when she agreed to testify to special prosecutor Patrick Fitzgerald's grand jury after receiving a personal waiver, both on the phone and in writing, of her earlier confidential source agreement with Lewis "Scooter" Libby. No other reporter whose testimony had been sought in the case had received such a direct and particularized release. Her incarceration has helped fuel an effort in Congress to enact a federal shield law, comparable to the state shield laws that protect reporters in 31 of the 50 states. After her second appearance before the grand jury, Miller was released from her contempt of court finding. Miller resigned from the paper on November 9, 2005.

=== Delayed publication of 2005 NSA warrantless surveillance story ===
The New York Times learned of the National Security Agency (NSA) warrantless surveillance program as early as autumn 2004, before the 2004 presidential election between George W. Bush and John Kerry. However, the newspaper did not publish reporting on the secret program (obtained by James Risen and Eric Lichtblau) until late December 2005, after more than a year. When it published the article, the newspaper reported that it had delayed publication because the George W. Bush White House had argued that publication "could jeopardize continuing investigations and alert would-be terrorists that they might be under scrutiny." The delayed publication of the New York Times story prompted debate, and the Los Angeles Times noted that the timing left "critics on the left wondering why the paper waited so long to publish the story and those on the right wondering why it was published at all." Times executive editor Bill Keller denied that the timing of the reporting was linked to any external event, such as the December 2005 Iraqi parliamentary election, the impending publication of Risen's book State of War: The Secret History of the CIA and the Bush Administration, or the then-ongoing debate on Patriot Act reauthorization. Risen and Lichtblau won the Pulitzer Prize for National Reporting in 2006.

In an interview in 2013, Keller said that the newspaper had decided not to report the piece after being pressured by the Bush administration and being advised not to do so by The New York Times Washington bureau chief Philip Taubman, and that "Three years after 9/11, we, as a country, were still under the influence of that trauma, and we, as a newspaper, were not immune."

In 2014, PBS Frontline interviewed Risen and Lichtblau, who said that the newspaper's plan was initially to not publish the story at all, and that "The editors were furious at me" and "thought I was being insubordinate." Risen wrote his book about the mass surveillance revelations after Times declined the piece's publication, and only released it after Risen told them that he would publish the book. Another reporter told NPR that the newspaper "avoided disaster" by ultimately publishing the story. Also in 2014, Edward Snowden cited the delay in the reporting in choosing not to supply The New York Times with his information about global surveillance programs; Snowden chose to go to the Guardian and The Washington Post instead.

=== MoveOn.org ad controversy ===
On September 10, 2007, the Times ran a full-page advertisement for MoveOn.org questioning the integrity of General David Petraeus, the commander of U.S. forces in Iraq, entitled "General Petraeus or General Betray Us?" The Times charged MoveOn.org, a liberal activist group, $65,000 for the advertisement, less than the approximately $181,000 basic rate for such an ad. After the New York Post ran a story suggesting that the Times had a political bias in advertising rates, a spokeswoman for the paper said that it did not "distinguish the advertising rates based on the political content of the ad" and that "the advertising folks did not see the content of the ad before the rate was quoted." The paper said that its advertising rates varied for many reasons, with ad buyers getting discounts for bulk buys or a "standby" rate, in which a buyer purchases an ad with no guarantee of a particular date or specific placement in the paper. MoveOn purchased a "standby" rate ad. A subsequent full-page ad bought by Republican presidential primary candidate Rudy Giuliani to rebut MoveOn's original ad was purchased at the same standby rate. MoveOn paid the Times the full rate after the newspaper said that "an advertising sales representative made a mistake" by "fail[ing] to make it clear that for that rate the Times could not guarantee the Monday placement but left MoveOn.org with the understanding that the ad would run then."

The ad was also controversial given that the Times' internal advertising manual said, "We do not accept opinion advertisements that are attacks of a personal nature." The Times executive who approved the advertisement for print conceded that its criticism of Petraeus was "rough", but viewed it as commenting on a public official's performance and thus acceptable.

=== Duke University lacrosse case reporting ===
Daniel Okrent, former Times ombudsman admitted to bias in the Times coverage of the Duke lacrosse case. He said, "It was too delicious a story. It conformed too well to too many preconceived notions of too many in the press: white over black, rich over poor, athletes over non-athletes, men over women, educated over non-educated. Wow. That's a package of sins that really fit the preconceptions of a lot of us."

=== John McCain-lobbyist article criticism ===
On February 21, 2008, The New York Times published an article on John McCain's alleged relationship with lobbyist Vicki Iseman and other involvement with special interest groups. The article received widespread criticism among both liberals and conservatives, McCain supporters and non-supporters, and talk radio personalities. Robert S. Bennett, whom McCain had hired to represent him in the matter, defended McCain's character. Bennett, who had been the special investigator during the Keating Five scandal that The Times revisited in the article, said that he fully investigated McCain back then and suggested to the Senate Ethics Committee that they not pursue charges against McCain.

"And if there is one thing I am absolutely confident of, it is John McCain is an honest and honest man. I recommended to the Senate Ethics Committee that he be cut out of the case, that there was no evidence against him, and I think for the New York Times to dig this up just shows that Senator McCain's public statement about this is correct. It's a smear job. I'm sorry."

Lanny Davis, a former staffer to President Bill Clinton and campaigner for Hillary Clinton, said the article "had no merit." Stating that he did not support McCain's bid for the White House, Davis, who had himself lobbied for the same cause Iseman had lobbied McCain for, said that McCain only wrote a letter to the FCC to ask them to "act soon" and refused to write a letter that supported the sale of the television station the article talked about. Journalistic observers also criticized the article, albeit using milder language. Tom Rosenstiel, the director of the Project for Excellence in Journalism, suggested that the article does not make clear the nature of McCain's alleged "inappropriate" behavior: "The phrasing is just too vague." The article was later criticized by the White House and by several news organizations including the San Francisco Chronicle editorial board. Commentator Bill O'Reilly raised the question about why the paper had endorsed McCain on January 25, 2008, for the Republican nomination if they had information that alleged an inappropriate relationship. The Boston Globe, owned by the Times, declined to publish the story, choosing instead to run a version of the same story written by the competing Washington Post staff. That version focused almost exclusively on the pervasive presence of lobbyists in McCain's campaign and did not mention the sexual relationship that the Times article hinted at.

In response to the criticism, the Times editor Bill Keller was "surprised by the volume" and "by how lopsided the opinion was against our decision [to publish the article]". The diverse sentiments by the readers were summarized in a separate article by Clark Hoyt, the Times public editor, who concluded: "I think it is wrong to report the suppositions or concerns of anonymous aides about whether the boss is getting into the wrong bed."

In September 2008, McCain senior aide Steve Schmidt charged: "Whatever The New York Times once was, it is today not by any standard a journalistic organization. It is a pro-Obama advocacy organization that every day impugns the McCain campaign, attacks Sen. McCain, attacks Gov. Palin. ... Everything that is read in The New York Times that attacks this campaign should be evaluated by the American people from that perspective."

In December 2008, Iseman filed a lawsuit against The New York Times, alleging that the paper had defamed her by, in her view, falsely implying that she had an illicit romantic relationship with McCain. In February 2009, the suit "was settled without payment and The Times did not retract the article." Unusually, however, the Times agreed to publish a statement from Iseman's lawyers on the Times' website.

=== Alessandra Stanley errors ===
Alessandra Stanley is a television critic. Complaints were raised regarding the accuracy of her reporting. Her tribute to Walter Cronkite on July 18, 2009, contained eight factual errors. Clark Hoyt, the public editor of The New York Times described Stanley as "much admired by editors for the intellectual heft of her coverage of television" but "with a history of errors". The New York Times printed a correction:

An appraisal on Saturday about Walter Cronkite's career included a number of errors. In some copies, it misstated the date that Martin Luther King Jr. was killed and referred incorrectly to Cronkite's coverage of D-Day. King was killed on April 4, 1968, not April 30. Mr. Cronkite covered the D-Day landing from a warplane; he did not storm the beaches. In addition, Neil Armstrong set foot on the moon on July 20, 1969, not July 26. "The CBS Evening News" overtook "The Huntley-Brinkley Report" on NBC in the ratings during the 1967-68 television season, not after Chet Huntley retired in 1970. A communications satellite used to relay correspondents' reports from around the world was Telstar, not Telestar. Howard K. Smith was not one of the CBS correspondents Mr. Cronkite would turn to for reports from the field after he became anchor of "The CBS Evening News" in 1962; he left CBS before Mr. Cronkite was the anchor. Because of an editing error, the appraisal also misstated the name of the news agency for which Mr. Cronkite was Moscow bureau chief after World War II. At that time it was United Press, not United Press International.

Another contentious claim had occurred on September 5, 2005, in an article on Hurricane Katrina, in which she wrote "Fox's Geraldo Rivera did his rivals one better: yesterday, he nudged an Air Force rescue worker out of the way so his camera crew could tape him as he helped lift an older woman in a wheelchair to safety." The Times later acknowledged that no nudge was visible on the broadcast tape.

=== M.I.A. quotes out of context (2009–10) ===
In February 2009, a Village Voice music blogger accused the newspaper of using "chintzy, ad-hominem allegations" in an article on British Tamil music artist M.I.A. concerning her activism against the Sinhala-Tamil conflict in Sri Lanka. M.I.A. criticized the paper in January 2010 after a travel piece rated post-conflict Sri Lanka the "#1 place to go in 2010".

In June 2010, The New York Times Magazine published a correction on its cover article of M.I.A., acknowledging that the interview conducted by current W editor and then-Times Magazine contributor Lynn Hirschberg contained a recontextualization of two quotes. In response to the piece, M.I.A. broadcast Hirschberg's phone number and secret audio recordings from the interview via her Twitter and website.

== 2010s ==
=== Cleveland rape case ===
The Times faced criticism after a 2011 article by James C. McKinley Jr. entitled "Vicious Assault Shakes Texas Town", which profiled the arrests of 18 young men and teenage boys from the community of Cleveland, Texas, for gang-raping an 11-year-old girl four times over the course of a year. The article focused mainly on the reaction of the local community, many of whom were quoted as expressing sympathy for the alleged rapists and laying blame on the victim's family, and was widely criticised for doing little to present an alternative view and instead presenting the support for the alleged rapists at face value, as well as failing to push back on malicious remarks about the victim and her family. McKinley also noted that the victim "dressed older than her age, wearing makeup and fashions more appropriate to a woman in her 20s", which was criticised for implying that the victim had "provoked" the assault by dressing provocatively. In response to criticism, the Times dispatched a reporter back to Cleveland and published an opinion piece by Arthur Brisbane entitled "Gang Rape Story Lacked Balance" which was heavily critical of McKinley's reporting.

=== Nail salon series (2015) ===
In May 2015, a New York Times exposé by Sarah Maslin Nir on the working conditions of manicurists in New York City and elsewhere and the health hazards to which they are exposed attracted wide attention, resulting in emergency workplace enforcement actions by New York governor Andrew M. Cuomo. In July 2015, the story's claims of widespread illegally low wages were challenged by former New York Times reporter Richard Bernstein, in The New York Review of Books. Bernstein, whose wife owns two nail salons, asserted that such illegally low wages were inconsistent with his personal experience, and were not evidenced by ads in the Chinese-language papers cited by the story. The New York Times editorial staff subsequently answered Bernstein's criticisms with examples of several published ads and stating that his response was industry advocacy. The independent NYT Public Editor also reported that she had previously corresponded with Bernstein and looked into his complaints, and expressed her belief that the story's reporting was sound.

In September and October 2015, nail salon owners and workers protested at The New York Times offices several times, in response to the story and the ensuing New York State crackdown. In October, Reason magazine published a three-part re-reporting of the story by Jim Epstein, charging that the series was filled with misquotes and factual errors respecting both its claims of illegally low wages and health hazards. Epstein additionally argued that The New York Times had mistranslated the ads cited in its answer to Bernstein, and that those ads actually validated Bernstein's argument.

In November 2015, The New York Times' public editor concluded that the exposé's "findings, and the language used to express them, should have been dialed back — in some instances substantially" and recommended that "The Times write further follow-up stories, including some that re-examine its original findings and that take on the criticism from salon owners and others — not defensively but with an open mind."

=== 2016 Democratic primaries ===
Responding to complaints alleging that the paper's news coverage favored Hillary Clinton over Bernie Sanders during the 2016 Democratic presidential primaries, The Times public editor Margaret Sullivan wrote that "The Times has not ignored Mr. Sanders's campaign, but it hasn't always taken it very seriously. The tone of some stories is regrettably dismissive, even mocking at times. Some of that is focused on the candidate's age, appearance and style, rather than what he has to say." Times senior editor Carolyn Ryan defended both the volume of The New York Times coverage (noting that Sanders had received about the same amount of article coverage as Jeb Bush and Marco Rubio) and its tone.

=== Dismissed discrimination lawsuit ===
In April 2016, two black female employees in their sixties filed a federal class-action lawsuit against The New York Times Company executives; they claimed age, gender, and racial discrimination, alleging that the 'Times advertising department favored younger white employees over older black employees in making firing and promotion decisions. The Times said that the suit was "entirely without merit" and was "a series of recycled, scurrilous and unjustified attacks." The plaintiffs' gender discrimination claims were subsequently dismissed by the court, and the court also later denied class certification as to the age and racial discrimination claims.

=== Sari and Hindutva ===
An article published in 2017 by author Asgar Qadri in the Times (titled "In India, fashion has become a nationalist cause") was criticized by Indian Twitter users and some commentators, such as Barkha Dutt, for suggesting that the sari was co-opted by the Hindutva movement. Critics said that the article was inaccurate and orientalist.

=== Publishing leaked photos from the Manchester bombing ===
On May 24, 2017, The New York Times caused outrage among the British police and government when it published leaked photos showing the scene of the Manchester Arena bombing. Counter terror police chiefs said the leak undermined their investigation and victims' and witnesses' confidence. The New York Times published photos it says were gathered by UK authorities at the scene of the attack, including the remnants of a backpack, nuts and screws, and a device identified as a "possible detonator". Greater Manchester Police were said to be "furious" and said they would stop sharing information with the United States. President Donald Trump the next day in a NATO summit condemned the media leaks, calling it "deeply troubling" and a "grave threat to our national security". The New York Times defended its decision to publish the photos, saying they were "neither graphic nor disrespectful of victims".

=== Caliphate podcast ===
Caliphate, a podcast for The New York Times, has been criticized numerous times after Abu Huzaifa al-Kanadi admitted on the podcast that he "murdered people" while he was fighting for the Islamic State group. Numerous conservatives called for action against him after his statement, including Canadian politician Candice Bergen. She criticized the Liberal government of Justin Trudeau for his not ordering law enforcement against al-Kanadi. Bergen also called for then Public Safety Minister Ralph Goodale to reveal whether the government knew where al-Kanadi was, but Goodale stated that it was the "opposition of keeping Canadians safe". Huzaifa also was criticized by television journalist Diana Swain, who said that al-Kanadi may have been "lying" to The New York Times or CBC News.

In December 2020 The New York Times admitted that it could not verify the claims made in the podcast. The podcast was later withdrawn from consideration as a Pulitzer finalist.

=== Hiring of Sarah Jeong ===
In August 2018, the Times hired Sarah Jeong to join its editorial board as lead writer on technology, commencing in September. The hiring sparked a strongly negative reaction in conservative media, which highlighted derogatory tweets about white people that Jeong had posted mostly in 2013 and 2014. Critics characterized her tweets as being racist; Jeong said that the posts were "counter-trolling" in reaction to harassment she had experienced, and that she regretted adopting this tactic. The Times stated that it had reviewed her social media history before hiring her, and that it did not condone the posts.

=== Obituary of Thomas S. Monson (2018) ===
The New York Times' 2018 obituary for Thomas S. Monson, President of the Church of Jesus Christ of Latter Day Saints, was criticized for focusing on Monson's opposition to same-sex marriage and ordination of women as priests. Obituaries editor William McDonald defended the newspaper's coverage of controversies under Monson's tenure, highlighting that the article noted Monson's openness to research on church records, expansion of missionaries to include more women, and interdenominational humanitarian efforts.

=== Elimination of copy editors (2018) ===
The New York Times announced plans to eliminate copy editing roles from the production of its daily newspaper and website content in June 2018. Executive Editor Dean Baquet defended the cuts, saying that the Times needed to free up funds to hire more reporters by eliminating editing roles. (The opinion and magazine sections have still retained their copy editors.) The duties of copy editors—checking style, grammar, factual correctness, and tone, as well as writing headlines—were merged into all-purpose editing roles. Editors currently not only edit the content of the stories but also, in many cases, conduct the final read before publication.

Many publications, such as the Chronicle of Higher Education, have suggested that the elimination of copy editors has led to more mistakes, such as typos and factual errors, in the paper. The Poynter Institute similarly suggested in a blog post that the elimination of copy editors would decrease internal expertise and hurt the quality of daily news reporting.

=== 1619 Project ===
The 1619 Project, a long-form journalism project re-evaluating slavery and its legacy in the United States by investigative journalist Nikole Hannah-Jones, has been criticized by some historians.

In December 2019, a group of historians wrote to The New York Times Magazine, expressing concern over what they alleged were inaccuracies and falsehoods fundamental to Hannah-Jones' reporting. The magazine's editor-in-chief, Jake Silverstein, responded to the historians' letter in an editorial, in which he called into question the historical accuracy of some of the letter's claims. In an article in The Atlantic, historian Sean Wilentz responded to Silverstein, writing, "No effort to educate the public in order to advance social justice can afford to dispense with a respect for basic facts" and disputed the accuracy of Silverstein's defense of the project.

In September 2020, controversy arose over the Times updating the opening text of the project website to remove the phrase "understanding 1619 as our true founding" without accompanying editorial notes. Critics, including Bret Stephens of the Times, claimed the difference showed that the newspaper was backing away from some of the initiative's more controversial claims. The Times defended its practices and Hannah-Jones emphasized how most of the project's content had remained unchanged—but also admitted that she was "absolutely tortured by" her failure to consult more expert historians before making the sweeping claims that were subsequently removed.

== 2020s ==
=== Tom Cotton editorial (2020) ===
During the George Floyd protests in June 2020, the Times published an opinion piece by U.S. Senator Tom Cotton entitled "Send in the Troops", which called for the mobilization of the U.S. military in response to rioting, and for "an overwhelming show of force to disperse, detain and ultimately deter lawbreakers", and which contained claims about the protests that the Times had previously identified as misinformation. Several current and former Times reporters criticized the decision to publish the piece and accused the newspaper of publishing misinformation. The NewsGuild of New York argued that the piece encouraged violence and lacked context and vetting. A. G. Sulzberger and editorial page editor James Bennet defended the piece, but the paper later issued a statement saying the piece failed to meet its editorial standards and described its publication as the result of a "rushed editorial process". Bennet resigned days later. Cotton criticized the Times for retracting his piece, saying "The New York Times editorial page editor and owner defended it in public statements but then they totally surrendered".

In December 2023, Bennet wrote an essay in The Economist, stating that his ousting came despite private support for publishing the op-ed from The New York Times leadership, including publisher A.G. Sulzberger and executive editor Dean Baquet.

=== Coverage of The Babylon Bee (2021) ===
In June 2021, Seth Dillon, the CEO of conservative Christian news satire website The Babylon Bee, threatened legal action against The New York Times, alleging that they had defamed the site in a March 2021 article by referring to The Babylon Bee as a "far-right misinformation site". The Times first amended the article, then removed the descriptor and published a clarification about the labeling dispute between Snopes and The Babylon Bee.

=== Screams Without Words (2023) ===
On December 28, 2023, The New York Times published an exposé entitled "'Screams Without Words': How Hamas Weaponized Sexual Violence on Oct. 7" on rape and sexual violence during the October 7 attacks and Gaza war, describing such violence as having been "weaponized" by Hamas. The investigative team, led by Times journalist Jeffrey Gettleman and including journalist Adam Sella and filmmaker Anat Schwartz, both Israeli freelancers, spent October to December 2023 collecting video footage, photographs, GPS data from mobile phones and interviews from more than 150 people, and concluded that sexual assaults and mutilations of Israeli women and girls were carried out in least seven locations on 7 October.

Critics of the piece have described it as atrocity propaganda. In February 2024, Jeremy Scahill, Ryan Grim, and Daniel Boguslaw published "Between the Hammer and the Anvil" in The Intercept, which called into question the journalistic practices that went into the making the piece as well as the qualifications and motivations of Schwartz. The editorial process behind the article was criticized, with concerns raised including the use of inexperienced reporters, an overreliance on witness testimony, weak corroboration, and a lack of supporting forensic evidence.

The Times stood by its story, saying that it was "rigorously reported, sourced and edited".

According to Haaretz, "The report reverberated around the world and was viewed in Israel as a highly significant step in recognizing the atrocities, pushing back against the international community's alleged silence and hypocrisy on the subject."

On January 3, Mondoweiss published an article by an "anonymous group of Palestinian journalists in Israel" containing a critical review of statements in "Screams Without Words" about Gal Abdush. As described by Mondoweiss, some of Abdush's relatives, including her sisters and brother-in-law, stated that she had not been raped. Her brother-in-law, Nissim Abdush, stated that no official party had informed them of sexual assault, saying that "the media invented it". Her sisters Tali Barakha and Miral Altar pointed out perceived inconsistencies in the timing of events, with Altar writing that "[i]t doesn't make any sense that in four minutes, they raped her, slaughtered her, and burned her". The Mondoweiss article also pointed to a Ynet interview of Gal's mother, Eti Bracha, where she stated that she had only learned about the rape from "the New York Times reporter". However, Bracha, like Gal Abdush's brother and mother-in-law, said they believed Abdush was raped. Bracha stated that "there are witnesses who saw the sexual assault of my daughter".

In an article published in CounterPunch in early February, media scholar and Fordham University professor Robin Andersen criticized the strength of the investigation, noting major discrepancies between families' testimonies and the article's text.

In February 2024, Schwartz was found to have liked incendiary posts on social media, including one calling to "turn the strip into a slaughterhouse", "violate any norm, on the way to victory", and that "Those in front of us are human animals who do not hesitate to violate minimal rules." The Times launched an investigation; it reviewed Schwartz's social media posts, and made a preliminary statement that such activity breaches company policy. Schwartz subsequently locked and deleted her social media posts.

On February 28, The Intercept published an exposé building on claims by Mondoweiss, Electronic Intifada and The Grayzone that there were inconsistencies in the story and that it relied on witnesses despite questions about their credibility. The Intercept commented that Schwartz "may harbor animosity" toward Palestinians and felt "conflicting pressures between being a supporter of Israel's war effort and a Times reporter". Schwartz had told Keshet 12 in January 2024, "I'm also an Israeli, but I also work for New York Times. So all the time I'm like in this place between the hammer and the anvil."

Eden Wessely, who filmed Gal Abdush's body, told Ynet in January 2024 that New York Times co-authors Schwartz and Sella had "called me again and again and explained how important [her footage and testimony were] to Israeli hasbara." Wessely noted that Schwartz and Sella wanted "to know every detail". She said she understood that "there were disagreements within the [Abdush] family about the publication that she had been raped", but stated her belief that Gal's "voice should be heard, because her whole appearance screamed: 'Look at me, hear me, I was raped, I was murdered.'" The Intercept concluded that "the bigger scandal may be ... the process that allowed [the reporting] into print, and the life-altering impact the reporting had for thousands of Palestinians whose deaths were justified by the alleged systematic sexual violence orchestrated by Hamas the paper claimed to have exposed" and that the "Times's mission was to bolster a predetermined narrative".

On February 29, the New York Times re-affirmed its support of the investigation, calling it "rigorously reported, sourced and edited", and sent an email to The Intercept disputing a number of their assertions and seeking corrections.

In his critique of the controversy, former media columnist at The New York Times Ben Smith wrote in Semafor in early March that he found it "mind-boggling" that the Times "turned over crucial elements of its reporting on one of the most difficult and sensitive stories it has ever published to amateurs, one of whose social media posts would make reasonable people question her ability to be fair". The paper responded by denying this description, stating that Gettleman acted as a supervisor of the other two authors and that he "conducted dozens of interviews alongside them". Smith contrasted the Times article with a similar one in the Wall Street Journal, saying that the latter is "pedantically careful to be silent on two crucially important points: The Journal reaches no conclusion on whether sexual violence was a deliberate strategy of war. And it does not say who committed specific acts of sexual violence — Hamas fighters or other Gazans who may have crossed the open border. A gruesome photograph won't answer that question."

Per Smith, "Screams Without Words" "played a central role in an Israeli campaign to criticize American feminist organizations and the U.N. for not siding with Israel" in the war in Gaza. He was critical of aspects of the Intercept article, saying that it began with "implication of a government conspiracy but no indication of one". Commenting on the Intercept's assertion "that the departure of the Times' longtime Standards chief, Phil Corbett, was 'tied to the pressure he was under to soften coverage in Israel's favor'", he wrote that Corbett denied this as "completely wrong".

He further wrote that "the arguments over the Times coverage of both Israel and Gaza can seem hair-splitting and cruel. Few deny women were horribly assaulted amid the slaughter on October 7"; he quoted a veteran foreign correspondent as saying that "the rushed story — and attempt to mechanically take it apart — is a disservice to the actual humans at the center of it." He further wrote that it is "not entirely clear what [the story's claim of 'weaponized sexual violence'] means in a literal sense", and that "[the article] doesn't show that Hamas leaders or field commanders planned or ordered sexual attacks ... though it doesn't rule that out. The story's most conclusive details, taken from photographs of sexually mutilated bodies, can't answer that question."

The Intercept reported that in March, Schwartz was removed from a WhatsApp group used by Times reporters on Gaza, and that on 4 April the New York Times international editor informed his staff that the paper had cut ties with Schwartz due to her social media activity.

=== Taylor Swift sexuality speculation ===
On January 4, 2024, The New York Times published an opinion piece written by Anna Marks that argues that "a Sapphic possibility" exists in the work of singer-songwriter Taylor Swift, a ubiquitous figure in popular culture. Reactions to the piece were mostly negative and criticized it for promoting conspiracy theories and invading Swift's privacy.

=== Baldoni's defamation lawsuit ===
American actor Justin Baldoni filed a libel lawsuit for $250 million against The New York Times alleging that the Times had published an "unverified and self-serving narrative" using "cherry-picked and altered communications stripped of necessary context" in his feud with American actress Blake Lively and had ignored evidence disputing her claims. Baldoni's lawyer stated, "In this vicious smear campaign fully orchestrated by Blake Lively and her team, the New York Times cowered to the wants and whims of two powerful 'untouchable' Hollywood elites, disregarding journalistic practices and ethics once befitting of the revered publication by using doctored and manipulated texts and intentionally omitting texts which dispute their chosen PR narrative." The court dismissed Baldoni's lawsuit against The New York Times. In dismissing the case, the judge cited the paper's "fair report privilege" which protects publications when reporting on legal actions. The judge also viewed Baldoni as a public figure and that he needed to prove actual malice.

=== Columbia University applications hack and Zohran Mamdani ===
On July 3, 2025, The New York Times reported that when Zohran Mamdani, the Democratic nominee for mayor of New York City, submitted his unsuccessful college application to Columbia University, he checked the "Asian" and "Black or African American" boxes and wrote in "Ugandan" for the question about race. Mamdani is of Indian descent and was born in Uganda. The reporters used information hacked from Columbia, provided to them by an intermediary, and then confirmed by Mamdani before publication. Two days earlier, someone claiming to be the hacker had contacted Bloomberg News, providing 1.6 gigabytes of data with 2.5 million student applications sent to Columbia over several decades, and said he had stolen approximately 460 gigabytes of data in all. The hacker said one of their goals was to check whether Columbia was still using race-conscious admissions, contrary to a Supreme Court ruling; the hacker had also posted an image of Donald Trump on some of Columbia's computer screens during the last part of the hack. The Times had agreed to withhold the intermediary's real name, but said he wrote under the pseudonym "Crémieux" on Substack and X, and linked to those accounts, initially describing him as "an academic and an opponent of affirmative action." The description was later changed to "an academic who opposes affirmative action and writes often about I.Q. and race", and added that "his identity has been made public elsewhere."

The Guardian had identified "Crémieux" as Jordan Lasker a few months earlier, giving examples of his promotion of scientific racism and eugenics in his newsletter on Substack and of a co-authored paper another of the authors of which had been fired for misusing the data on which the paper relied. The Times was criticized for agreeing not to print his name and for its muted description of someone who had been described as a "white supremacist." Margaret Sullivan, a former public editor for the Times, said the story was not newsworthy. It was also criticized for publishing hacked information. The Times had previously declined to publish hacked information that it received in 2024 about the Donald Trump 2024 presidential campaign from an alleged Iranian hack.

Common Dreams, a progressive news organization, called the article a "hit piece." The Verge criticized the Times's commitment to journalistic objectivity leading it to present a false balance in political news stories. The Verge also questioned why the Times had focused on Mamdani's college application instead of the hack itself, arguing that the hack was the bigger story and that the Times had obtained a new lead on the identity of the hacker through their source.

Patrick Healy, the assistant managing editor for standards and trust at the Times, defended the article by saying "What matters most here is whether the information was true and factual—it was, confirmed by Mr. Mamdani; that it was independently confirmed; and that it is relevant to the public."

=== The Silence That Meets the Rape of Palestinians (2026) ===
"The Silence That Meets the Rape of Palestinians" is an opinion piece published in The New York Times on May 11, 2026, in which journalist Nicholas Kristof recounts interviews detailing widespread sexual abuse committed by Israeli prison guards, soldiers, settlers, and interrogators against Palestinians, especially those in Israeli custody. The premise of the article, which cites reports on sexual and gender-based violence against Palestinians during the Gaza war by the United Nations Commission on Human Rights, the Euro-Mediterranean Human Rights Monitor, the Committee to Protect Journalists, and B'Tselem, is that there is a disparity in how allegations of sexual violence are treated when the victims are Palestinian as opposed to when the victims are Israeli. Kristof relied on direct interviews with 14 Palestinians, including nonviolence activist Issa Amro and journalist Sami al-Sai, who reported having been sexually assaulted by Israeli settlers or members of Israeli forces.

The Israeli Ministry of Foreign Affairs called the article "Hamas propaganda" and "one of the worst blood libels ever to appear in the modern press" and Israeli Prime Minister Benjamin Netanyahu and Minister of Foreign Affairs Gideon Sa'ar announced legal action against The New York Times for libel. The Times said such legal action would be "without merit".

The piece elicited strong reactions from supporters of Israel. In response to critics of his piece, Kristof called on Israel to permit the Red Cross and lawyers to visit Palestinian detainees. Critics on the opposite side of the aisle also questioned why the story was published in the opinion section, arguing this constitutes a double standard with regard to coverage of the Israeli–Palestinian conflict in The New York Times, as articles alleging sexual abuse against Israelis haven been published in the news section. Others, including an executive director at Breaking the Silence, remark that the aggressive Israeli reaction is calculated as to deter further coverage of Israeli abuses.

On May 21, Kristof and NYT Opinion head Kathleen Kingsbury responded to questions regarding the article. The same day, the New York Times Opinion and The New York Times accounts on video-sharing networks posted a video with Kristof presenting material from his May 11 column, recordings of interviews with Palestinian survivors of sexual assault by Israelis, and videos and photos of Palestinians being subjected to sexual assault, one of which settlers posted to social media.

On May 29 the National Jewish Advocacy Center (NJAC),seedking access to the Board decisions related to this column. To this day the New York Times did not respond, prompting the lawsuit that was filed in September 2026. Ynet reported conflicts within The New York Times after the publication of the op-ed, with management defending it but prosecution from Israel, reporters warning of damage to brand credibility, quoting one as saying "The Opinion Department is lowering the professional level of all of us".

== See also ==
- Media bias
- Media bias in the United States
- Fox News controversies
- CNN controversies
- MSNBC controversies
- CBS News controversies and criticism
- Al Jazeera controversies and criticism
- The New York Times Simulator
