= Artists4Ceasefire =

Artists collective for Gaza war ceasefire

- Enamel pin worn by supporters of Artists4Ceasefire

- Mark Ruffalo wearing an Artists4Ceasefire pin at the 96th Academy Awards
- Formation: October 20, 2023; 3 years ago
- Type: Artist collective
- Purpose: Activism
- Website: artists4ceasefire.org

Artists4Ceasefire is a collective of actors, filmmakers, and other artists calling for an immediate and permanent ceasefire in the Gaza war, the delivery of humanitarian aid to civilians, and the release of all hostages. The collective was started on October 20, 2023, two weeks after the October 7 attacks.

The group that first formed to call for a ceasefire launched a new campaign on September 5, 2024, calling on the U.S. to stop sending Israel weapons, citing "grave human rights violations".

== History ==
Artists4Ceasefire was organized on October 20, 2023 as a volunteer organization to advocate for a calling for an immediate and permanent ceasefire in the Gaza war, the delivery of humanitarian aid, and the release of all hostages taken in the war. That month, 55 artists and entertainment industry members signed an open letter to President Joe Biden as part of the collective demanding a ceasefire. The letter reads: "We believe all life is sacred, no matter faith or ethnicity and we condemn the killing of Palestinian and Israeli civilians."

The collective partnered with artist Shepard Fairey and several humanitarian organizations, including Oxfam America, ActionAid USA, and the War Child Alliance. On October 27, 2023, Oxfam America declared its support for the collective via posts and stories on its Instagram account. On November 6, 2023, ActionAid USA released a statement of its support for the collective.

As of March 2024, the collective's open letter has expanded to include hundreds of artists, including (but not limited to) Ben Affleck, Bella and Gigi Hadid, Bradley Cooper, Cate Blanchett, Channing Tatum, David Oyelowo, Drake, Frank Ocean, Jennifer Lopez, Joaquin Phoenix, John Cusack, Jon Stewart, Kristen Stewart, Macklemore, Michael Stipe, Oscar Isaac, Quinta Brunson, Rachel McAdams, Sandra Oh, and Zayn Malik. Its other signatories include Alfonso Cuarón, Alyssa Milano, Andrew Garfield, Annie Lennox, Ayo Edebiri, Brian Cox, Cynthia Nixon, Dua Lipa, Hasan Minhaj, Janelle Monáe, Jenna Ortega, Jeremy Strong, Jim Jarmusch, Kirsten Dunst, Lupita Nyong'o, Mark Rylance, Mark Ruffalo, Michael Moore, Milla Jovovich, Peter Gabriel, Richard Gere, Selena Gomez, Tom Hardy, and Viggo Mortensen.

In September 2024, Artists4Ceasefire joined with Oxfam America, ActionAid, and Shepard Fairey to issue a call to action titled "Stop Weapons, Save Lives". Among those calling for a U.S. arms embargo on Israel are Mahershala Ali, Cynthia Nixon, Mark Ruffalo, and Ilana Glazer. "Our demand is simple—our elected leaders must enforce existing U.S. and international humanitarian laws that prohibit the use of military assistance to commit grave human rights violations", Ruffalo said.

== Pin ==
The Artists4Ceasefire enamel pin depicts an orange hand on a red background. A black heart appears inside the hand. Artists4Ceasefire said the orange hand represents "the beautiful community of people from all backgrounds that have come together in support of centering our shared humanity". Snopes compared the orange hand used in the design to red-hand symbols including the Red Hand of Ulster (a symbol used for the Irish province of Ulster), the symbol for Missing and Murdered Indigenous Women (MMIW), and people criticizing Israel as having "blood on its hands" for its actions in Gaza.

The Israeli government and New York Post journalist David Kaufman have falsely claimed the hand represents the 2000 Ramallah lynching. In an editorial in The Free Press, Seth Mandel wrote that the symbol "is meant to valorize the murderers of Jews".

=== People wearing pins ===
At the 2024 Grammy Awards, musician Annie Lennox finished her tribute to Sinéad O'Connor by saying, "Artists for ceasefire, peace in the world". The members of Boygenius (Phoebe Bridgers, Lucy Dacus, and Julien Baker) and Bo Burnham also wore Artists4Ceasefire pins.

At the Directors Guild of America Awards in February 2024, Ruffalo wore the pin and said: "We’re not going to bomb our way to peace".

Several attendees of the 2024 Academy Awards ceremony wore red Artists4Ceasefire badges, including Quannah Chasinghorse, Finneas O'Connell, Billie Eilish, Mark Ruffalo, Ava DuVernay, Ramy Youssef, Riz Ahmed, Mahershala Ali, Kaouther Ben Hania and Misan Harriman. Some attendees also wore Palestinian flag pins, including Milo Machado-Graner and Swann Arlaud. In an interview at the event, Youssef said:

We are all calling for an immediate and permanent ceasefire in Gaza. We are calling for the safety of everyone involved and we really want lasting justice and peace for the Palestinian people.

Tony Shalhoub and Ebon Moss-Bachrach wore the pins at the 2024 Screen Actors Guild Awards.

== See also ==
- Together for Palestine
- Boycott, Divestment and Sanctions
- Writers Against the War on Gaza
- No Music for Genocide
- Film Workers for Palestine
