= Adela Cojab =

Mexican-American activist and writer (born 1996)

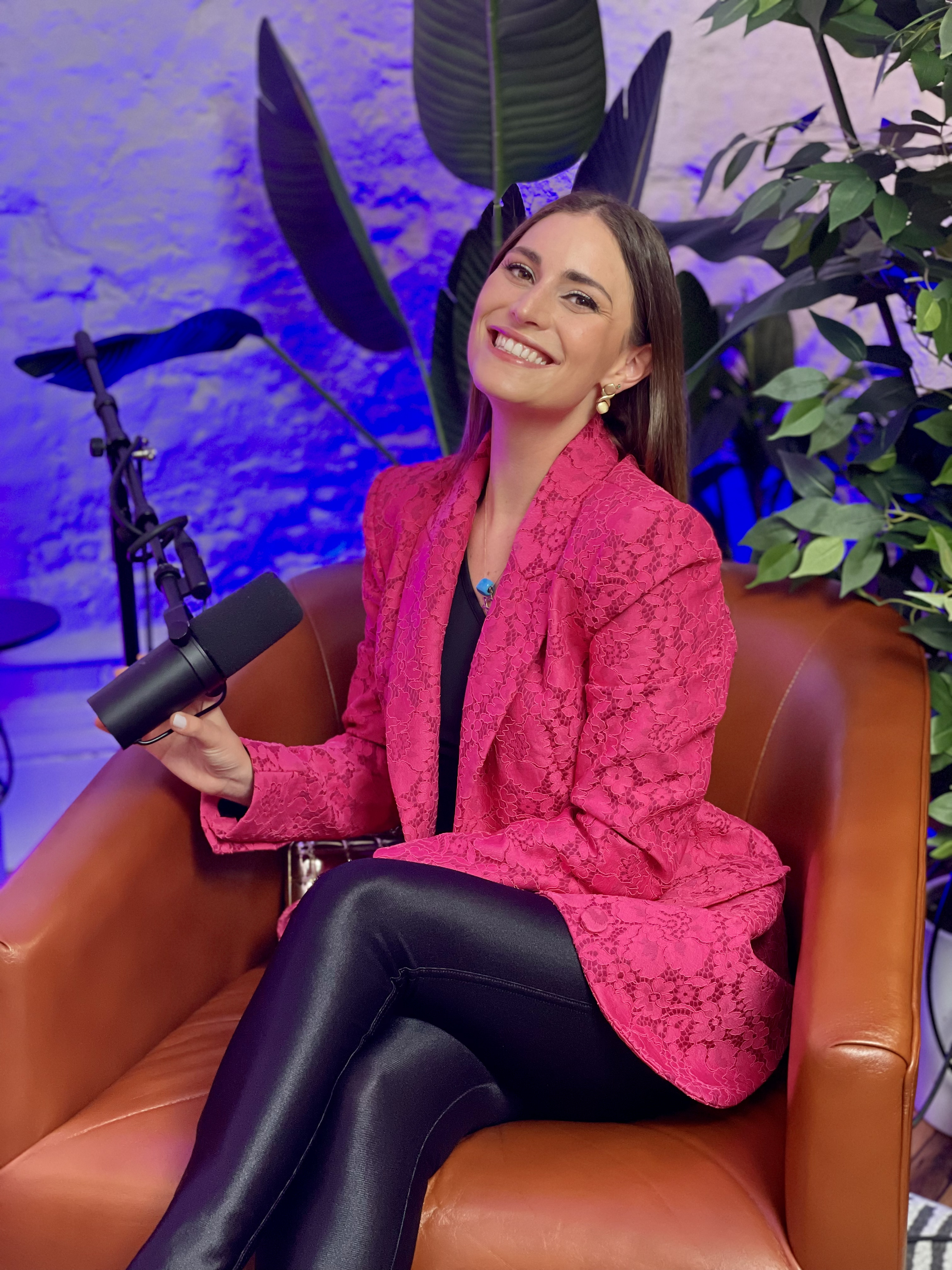
- Born: Adela Cojab Moadeb; November 12, 1996 (age 29)
- Education: New York University; Yeshiva University
- Occupations: Activist, author, podcaster, legal advocate
- Years active: 2019–present

Adela Cojab Moadeb (born November 12, 1996) is a Mexican-born American activist, author, podcaster, and legal advocate. She is known for advocating against antisemitism and for Zionist causes. Most notably, she is known for her formal complaint against New York University under Title VI of the Civil Rights Act of 1964 for allowing antisemitic activities on campus. Cojab is a legal fellow with the National Jewish Advocacy Center.

Cojab was also a host of the podcast American-ish Show: Daughters of the Diaspora, alongside Mariam Wahba, during 2022-2023.

== Early life ==
Cojab was born in Mexico City, Mexico. She is a Jew of Syrian and Lebanese descent. She moved to the United States in 2001. She grew up in Deal, New Jersey, and attended Hillel Yeshiva.

== Education ==
Cojab attended New York University and graduated from the Gallatin School of Individualized Study with a degree in Middle Eastern diaspora studies in 2019. While studying at NYU, she served as president of the student organization Realize Israel, Senator for Jewish and International Students on the school's University Senate, and the official representative for Jewish students for the United Nations' Economic and Social Council. She was also vice president of the AEPhi sorority and a chairperson for the American Union of Jewish Students. Cojab received a Broome & Allen Scholarship from the American Sephardi Foundation in 2018.

She went on to attend the Cardozo School of Law at Yeshiva University.

== Activism ==
During Cojab's time as president of the Realize Israel student group, 53 other student groups refused to co-sponsor events with Realize Israel as part of the Boycott, Divestment, and Sanctions (BDS) movement. One of the group's celebrations, Rave in the Park, was also disrupted by Anti-Zionist protestors affiliated with the student groups Students for Justice in Palestine and Jewish Voice of Peace, two of which were arrested for reckless endangerment and assault. One of the protestors arrested was one of Cojab's classmates in her Arabic seminar. Cojab was also subjected to social media attacks and social isolation for her Zionist stances.

In response to NYU giving an award to the university chapter of Students for Justice in Palestine, Cojab filed a Title VI complaint with the Department of Education Office for Civil Rights, calling for a full-fledged investigation into antisemitic activity on campus. The university reached a settlement with the Office of Civil Rights, with NYU revising its discrimination and harassment policies to include antisemitism.

As of 2025 Cojab is an attorney with the National Jewish Advocacy Center. In that capacity Cojab testified at a Senate Judiciary Committee hearing on rising anti-semitism in the US, where she said "Antisemitism thrives in loopholes. Congress has the power and the obligation to close them." She endorsed the Antisemitism Awareness Act, legislation then pending before Congress.

== Speaking engagements ==
In 2019, she spoke alongside President Donald Trump during the keynote address at the Israeli-American Council Annual Conference. In response to the events at NYU and other college campuses, President Trump would go on to sign an executive order expanding the definition of antisemitism to include "denying the Jewish people their right to self-determination," making such actions a Title VI violation. Cojab also spoke about on-campus advocacy at the Maccabee Academy Conference, hosted by the Maccabee Task Force at the Venetian hotel in Las Vegas in February 2019.

In 2022, Cojab was a speaker at the Sephardic Community Alliance BootCampUs event for high school students.

Cojab spoke about her experiences with antisemitism at her university at the World Jewish Congress's Lauder Fellowship Opening Seminar in 2022. Cojab also served as a speaker at the Lauder Fellowship Opening Seminar in 2023 at the second annual Jewish Youth Assembly, hosted by the World Jewish Congress. She also spoke at a community event rallying against antisemitism organized by the nonprofit organization Enough Is Enough in 2023.

== Media ==
Cojab wrote the chapter "Confronting Terror: The Buenos Aires Bombings" in the World Jewish Congress's 80th anniversary book, which was published in 2017.

Cojab co-hosted the talk show podcast American-ish Show: Daughters of the Diaspora with her co-host Mariam Wahba in 2022–2023.

== Personal life ==
Cojab is fluent in Spanish, English, Hebrew, and Portuguese.

In 2024, Cojab revealed that she attended a wellness retreat to address a compulsive cheese addiction that began during her time as a student activist at NYU, resulting in significant health concerns.

Adela Cojab placed third ("second runner-up") in the 2025 Miss Universe Israel pageant. The winner will represent Israel in the Miss Universe pageant.
