= No Music for Genocide =

Musician-led boycott protesting Israel's genocide in Gaza

- Formation: September 18, 2025
- Website: nomusicforgenocide.org

No Music for Genocide is an international cultural boycott initiative launched in September 2025 by musicians and record labels to protest Israel's military actions in Gaza and treatment of Palestinians. The movement calls on artists to remove their music from Israeli streaming platforms through geo-blocking measures. With over 400 initial participants including prominent acts like Massive Attack, Rina Sawayama, and Japanese Breakfast, the movement represents one of the most significant coordinated cultural boycotts against Israel since the Boycott, Divestment and Sanctions (BDS) movement began.

The initiative describes itself as a response to Israel's genocide in Gaza, ethnic cleansing of the Occupied West Bank, apartheid within Israel, and political repression of pro-Palestine efforts. Organized by a decentralized network of artists and independent labels, the movement employs geo-blocking techniques to restrict access to musical content on Israeli territory, with the dual purpose of symbolically rejecting normalization with Israel and applying economic pressure on the music industry to sever ties with Israeli entities.

== History ==
The No Music for Genocide movement publicly launched on September 18, 2025, after months of organizing by artists concerned about Israel's military operations in Gaza and the international music industry's limited response. The movement's immediate catalyst was the escalating humanitarian crisis in Gaza, particularly Palestinian children suffering from hunger amid Israel's continuing attacks. Organizers cited growing global outrage over Israel's military actions, which organizations including Amnesty International and the United Nations called genocidal.

The movement emerged within the broader context of the Boycott, Divestment and Sanctions (BDS) movement, which was founded in 2005 by Palestinian activist Omar Barghouti. While operating independently, No Music for Genocide coordinates with the Palestinian Campaign for the Academic and Cultural Boycott of Israel (PACBI), which oversees BDS's cultural boycott aspects. The initiative is explicitly inspired by the cultural boycott of apartheid South Africa in the 1980s, viewing artistic boycotts as historically effective tools for challenging state policies the international community considers oppressive.

A key precedent organizers cited was the music industry's response to Russia's invasion of Ukraine in 2022. Within months of the invasion, major record labels including Sony Music, Universal Music Group, and Warner Music Group had either removed their catalogs from Russia or closed operations entirely. No Music for Genocide organizers questioned why similar measures had not been taken against Israel "after decades of illegal occupation and 23 months into Israel's accelerated genocide". This discrepancy in treatment became a central motivating factor for the movement's creation.

In April 2026, the campaign released an open letter calling for a boycott of Eurovision until it bans Israel from the competition.

== Artists and labels who joined the movement ==
=== Initial signatories ===
The initial list of 400 artists who joined the boycott includes (alphabetically):

- 81355 – American hip-hop group
- Amyl and the Sniffers – Australian punk rock band
- Aminé – American rapper
- Ana Tijoux – Chilean-French musician and singer-songwriter
- Arca – Venezuelan musician and producer
- Beach Fossils – American indie rock band
- Ben Howard – English singer-songwriter and musician
- Black Country, New Road – English rock band
- Cecile Believe – Canadian musician
- Dorian Electra – American singer and songwriter
- Eartheater – American musician and visual artist
- Enter Shikari – British rock band
- Faye Webster – American singer-songwriter
- Fontaines D.C. – Irish post-punk band
- Frankie Cosmos – American indie pop artist
- Grizzly Bear – American rock band
- Japanese Breakfast – American indie pop artist
- Julia Holter – American composer and musician
- Kelela – American singer and songwriter
- King Krule – English singer and musician
- Kneecap – Irish rap group
- Lankum – Irish folk music group
- Massive Attack – English trip hop group
- Mogwai – Scottish post-rock band
- MØ – Danish singer and songwriter
- MJ Lenderman – American musician
- MIKE – American rapper
- Nadine Shah – English singer-songwriter
- Palmistry – musician and producer
- Pinegrove – American rock band
- Primal Scream – Scottish rock band
- Redveil – American rapper
- Rina Sawayama – Japanese-British singer and songwriter
- Sasami – American musician and producer
- Sleaford Mods – English post-punk duo
- Soccer Mommy – American indie rock project
- Sudan Archives – American singer and violinist
- Water from Your Eyes – American experimental pop duo
- Yaeji – American house and trap artist
- Yeule – Singaporean-born British musician and visual artist
- Young Fathers – Scottish alternative hip-hop group
- Zeid Hamdan – Lebanese music producer

Record labels that have joined the boycott include:

- All Saints Records (All Saints) – British independent record label
- Arbutus Records – Canadian independent record label based in Montreal
- Angels Records – British recording studio
- Bayonet Records – Brooklyn-based independent record label founded by Dustin Payseur of Beach Fossils
- Constellation Records – Canadian independent record label based in Montreal, known for post-rock and experimental music
- PAN (PAN Records) – Berlin-based experimental music label
- Tambourhinoceros – Danish independent record label
- Topshelf Records – American independent record label specializing in emo, indie rock, and punk

=== Subsequent support and growth ===
Since its launch, No Music for Genocide has grown significantly, attracting over 1,000 participants in its first month. Notable artists and entities who have publicly declared their participation include:

- Aurora – Norwegian singer-songwriter
- BadBadNotGood – Canadian instrumental band
- Björk – Icelandic musician and actress
- Clairo – American singer-songwriter
- Denzel Curry – American rapper
- Elisapie – Canadian Inuk musician and actress
- Hayley Williams – American singer-songwriter
- Hot Chip – British electronic music band
- Hyperdub – British electro music record label
- Idles – English post-punk band
- Lorde – New Zealand singer-songwriter
- Lucy Dacus – American singer-songwriter and member of indie rock supergroup Boygenius
- Muna – American indie pop band
- My Bloody Valentine – Irish-English rock band
- Nao – English singer and songwriter
- Paramore – American rock band
- Pinegrove – American rock band
- Ryuichi Sakamoto – Japanese composer (by his estate; Sakamoto died in 2023)
- Shygirl – British singer and DJ
- Wolf Alice – English rock band

== Reception ==
The movement has received support from Palestinian artists and cultural organizations. ZOHUD, a Palestinian musician from Gaza, said: "As a Gazan musician, I have witnessed firsthand how essential music is to people's ability to live, recover, and maintain hope. It is never acceptable to use music to normalise oppression or to hide crimes against humanity". Palestinian musician Ahmed Eid emphasized the need to "amplify Palestinian music" during this period.

Organizers said one of their primary goals was to inspire others to "reclaim their agency and direct their influence toward a tangible act".

== See also ==
- Artists4Ceasefire
- Boycott, Divestment and Sanctions
- Cultural discourse about the Gaza genocide
- Disinvestment from Israel
- Film Workers for Palestine
- Macklemore–Ed Sheeran tour controversy
- Together for Palestine
- Writers Against the War on Gaza
