= Hillel Yeshiva =

Private school in Monmouth County, New Jersey, United States

Location
- 1025 Deal Road (elementary school) / 1027 Deal Road (high school); Ocean Township, Monmouth County, New Jersey 07712; United States
- 40.2513°N 74.0533°W

Information
- Type: Private High School, Yeshiva
- NCES School ID: 02044126
- Head of school: Rabbi Ari Katz (ELC–8); Rabbi Yaakov Sadigh (high school)
- Faculty: 146.6 FTEs
- Grades: PreN - 12
- Enrollment: 916 (as of 2021–22)
- Student to teacher ratio: 6.2:1
- Accreditation: Middle States Association of Colleges and Schools
- Website: hillelyeshiva.org

Hillel Yeshiva is a private Modern Orthodox Jewish day school located in Ocean Township, in Monmouth County, in the U.S. state of New Jersey. It provides an integrated pre-school through twelfth grade program that facilitates the study of both Judaic and secular studies.

As of the 2021–22 school year, the school had an enrollment of 916 students and 146.6 classroom teachers (on an FTE basis), for a student–teacher ratio of 6.2:1. The school's student body was 100% White.

The school has been accredited by the Middle States Association of Colleges and Schools Commission on Elementary and Secondary Schools since 2011. Hillel Yeshiva, Middle States Association of Colleges and Schools Commission on Elementary and Secondary Schools.

== Notable alumni ==
- Adela Cojab (born 1996), author and activist advocating against antisemitism and for Zionist causes
- Lahav Harkov, journalist who serves as the senior contributing editor and diplomatic correspondent of The Jerusalem Post
