= The New York War Crimes =

Bi-monthly American protest publication

The New York (War) Crimes
- "All the Consent That's Fit to Manufacture"
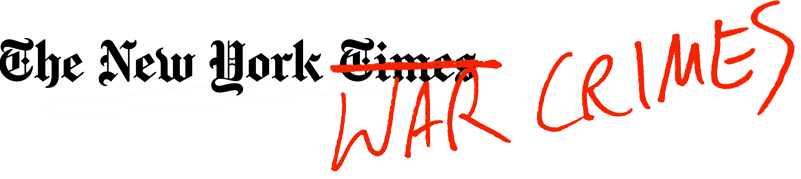

- Front page on October 7, 2025
- Founder: Writers Against the War on Gaza
- Founded: November 9, 2023; 3 years ago
- Website: newyorkwarcrimes.com

The New York (War) Crimes is a bi-monthly protest publication associated with Writers Against the War on Gaza (WAWOG) in parody of The New York Times. It was founded November 9, 2023 during the Gaza war and genocide and it is published as a printed newspaper and website.

== History ==
The New York (War) Crimes (NYWC) formed as an ad-hoc collective adjacent to the Writers Against the War on Gaza (WAWOG). In an interview in The Baffler, a collective of editors of The New York (War) Crimes described the beginning of its newspaper as "a piece of agitprop for protest against the New York Times" that became more of a movement outlet. They decided to target The New York Times because of what they see as a longstanding bias in favor of the Israeli military, arguing that "when there's no way to write a headline that will otherwise exculpate the Israeli army, they'll just print a headline with no verbs." The collective chose to target it in particular because they see it as the newspaper of record of the US and the West, and they see its prestige, malfeasance, and complicity as exemplary. According to the collective, The New York Times is "essentially state media, they have the same consent-manufacturing function, but they operate under a conceit of independence, journalistic integrity, and the pursuit of noble truth or whatever."

Its first issue in November 2023 consisted of three broadsheets with the names of the 7,000 dead that the Gaza Health Ministry reported killed by "Zionist forces," according to The New York (War) Crimes. It drew inspiration from the 1989 ACT UP and Gran Fury project New York Crimes, a mock version of the New York Times made to draw attention to the paper's "malfeasance" in the mass death of the AIDS epidemic, as well as an actual issue from New York Times during the COVID-19 pandemic that featured a front page filled entirely with columns of names of the dead as the US death toll approached 100,000.

The New York (War) Crimes also exists as a website launched "to present the case against the Times systematically, including detailed analysis of their Palestine coverage and extensive historical background of their complicity with U.S. empire from Guatemala to Iran to Vietnam."

On September 28, 2025, photographer Alexa Wilkinson was arrested and charged with a felony hate crime, with a complaint written by a New York Police Department (NYPD) detective citing a video on TikTok containing New York War Crimes infographics over shots of vandalism at the New York Times Building.

== Positions ==
On the university protests against the war and genocide in Gaza, The New York (War) Crimes published:

The Student Intifada has revealed to the world the role of the American university: to perpetuate and reproduce the capitalist-imperialist system and proactively quell threats to the ruling class ... While operating with a mandate to nurture education and 'intellectual' development, the university is hardly a neutral space. It shapes and reinforces the rest of the superstructure ... and uphold[s] legislation that enforces the power mechanisms of the state.

== See also ==
- Criticism of the New York Times § Gaza war coverage
- The New York Times § Israeli–Palestinian conflict
