= Lahav Harkov =

American-born Israeli journalist

- להב הרקוב
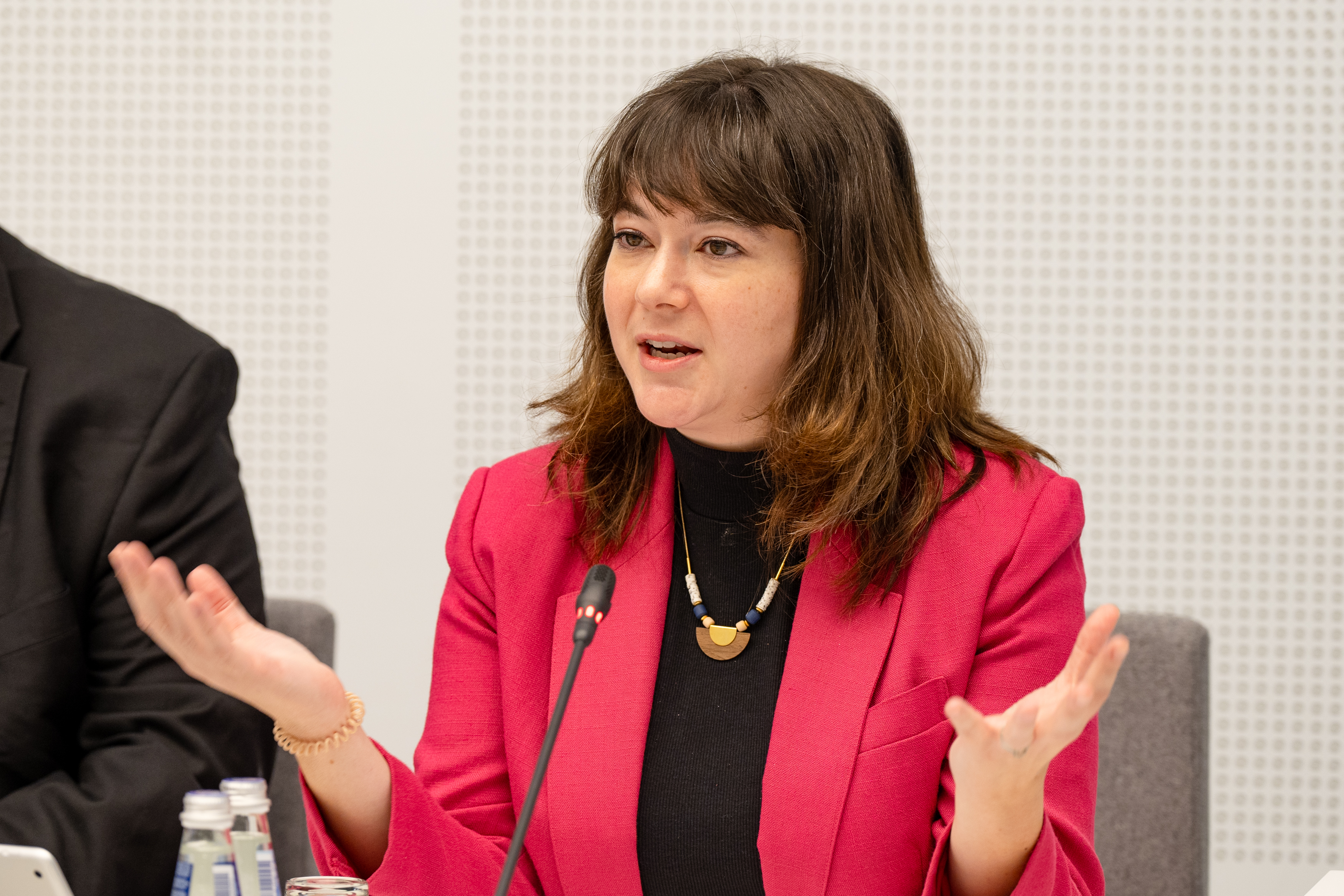
- Harkov in 2024
- Born: 1988 (age 37–38); United States
- Education: Bar Ilan University
- Occupation: Journalist

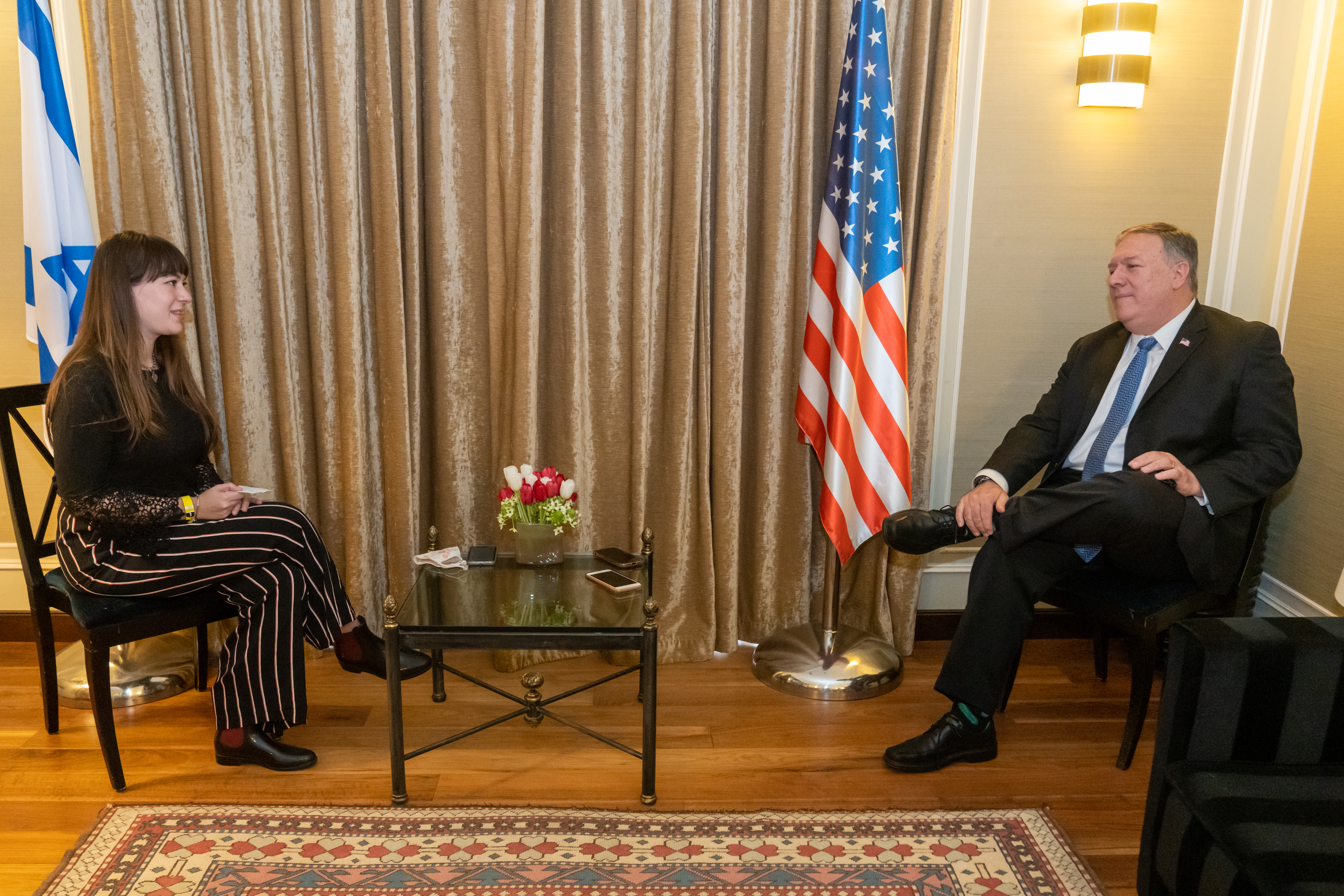
Harkov (left) with US Secretary of state Mike Pompeo (right) in 2020

Lahav Harkov (Hebrew: להב הרקוב; born 1988) is an Israeli journalist who currently serves as the Senior Political Correspondent of Jewish Insider covering Israeli politics & diplomacy. She was formerly the Senior Contributing Editor and Diplomatic Correspondent of The Jerusalem Post.

== Early life and education ==
Harkov grew up in Deal, New Jersey, and Long Branch, New Jersey, and attended Hillel Yeshiva in Ocean Township. She moved to Israel in 2005 at the age of 17. Following two years of National Service with museums, she enrolled at Bar-Ilan University, where she completed a degree in Political Science and Communications. She was inspired to write by her grandmother.

== Career ==
Harkov reports on and analyzes Israel's foreign relations with the world. Harkov got her start as the Jerusalem Post's Knesset reporter when the former correspondent went on maternity leave. After eight years in the position, she was promoted to senior contributing editor and diplomatic correspondent. In August 2021, Harkov accompanied then Prime Minister Naftali Bennett to Washington. They had to stay in Washington over Shabbat and Harkov wrote about the experience.

In June 2022, Harkov along with Jerusalem Post editor Avi Mayer was the first Israeli media outlet to interview Prime Minister Benjamin Netanyahu since his comeback. She started co-hosting the Jerusalem Post Podcast with former editor Yaakov Katz. When Katz left, she began co-hosting it with his successor Avi Mayer.

In September 2023, Harkov joined Jewish Insider as their senior political correspondent.

Harhov has written about Israel for publications such as the New York Post, Tablet, AIJAC, National Review, Unherd, and Commentary.

== Personal life ==
Harkov was recognised by Nefesh B’Nefesh as one of the Millennial Olim (Immigrants) Who Are Making Their Mark On Israel. She lives in central Israel with her husband and four children.

She has been named as one of the most influential people on Jewish Twitter.
