= Jazmine Hughes =

American writer and editor

- Born: October 25, 1991 (age 34)
- Education: Connecticut College (BA); Columbia University (Non-Degree Certificate)
- Occupations: Writer, editor
- Years active: 2012-present
- Employer: The New York Times Magazine
- Awards: Forbes 30 Under 30; Honorary doctorate, Connecticut College
- Website: twitter.com/jazzedloon

Jazmine Hughes (born October 25, 1991) is an American writer and editor. From 2015 to 2023, she was an editor at The New York Times Magazine. Previously she served as contributing editor of The Hairpin. Her work has also appeared in The New Yorker, Elle, Cosmopolitan, and The New Republic.

== Early life ==
Hughes was born on October 25, 1991, in New Haven, Connecticut. She grew up with four sisters and was homeschooled until the fifth grade. She attended Connecticut College where she studied government and served as editor-in-chief of the school newspaper before graduating in 2012 at age 20. After college she attended the Columbia Publishing Course.

== Career ==
Hughes began her career as a fact-checker at New York Magazine, one of only two black employees (the other worked in the mail room) at the publication throughout her first year there. Hughes served as contributing editor of The Hairpin before becoming an associate editor at The New York Times Magazine in March 2015, where she worked until November 2023. At the Times Magazine, Hughes edited the "Letter of Recommendation" feature and the "Talk" column.

Hughes has drawn particular attention for her writing on topics from "imposter syndrome" to race and humor, as well as for her own humor writing. In 2016, HelloGiggles named Hughes to its list of "14 Women of the Internet Inspiring Us on International Women's Day" and The L Magazine named Hughes to its 2014 "30 Under 30" list. Brooklyn Magazine named her to its 2016 list of "100 Most Influential People in Brooklyn Culture," describing her writing for The Hairpin as "immensely, deservedly popular." Interviewing Hughes in 2015, Longform Podcast describes her as "very young and...very successful in her short time in the media world;" Hughes earned her editorial post at The New York Times Magazine at age 23. The Huffington Post named Hughes's Hairpin piece on her sisters to its year-end list of "28 Pieces From 2014 That Should Be Required Reading For Women" and Autostraddle called her piece on dressing like Cookie Lyon to battle imposter syndrome one of 2015's "best longform written by women." Hughes has also profiled Elaine Welteroth of Teen Vogue and Charlemagne Tha God for the New York Times Magazine.

Forbes named Hughes to its 2018 30 Under 30 list for media. In 2020, she received the ASME NEXT Award for Journalists Under 30. In 2023, she received the National Magazine Award for Profile Writing.

On November 3, 2023, the New York Times announced that Hughes had resigned, after having signed with Jamie Lauren Keiles the Writers Against the War on Gaza letter, an open letter accusing Israel of attempting to "conduct genocide" in the course of the Gaza war. The newspaper said that Hughes' actions were a "violation of The Times’s policy on public protest".

== Advocacy ==
Hughes is also a cofounder of the group Writers of Color, establishing a searchable database of contemporary writers of color in order to "create more visibility for writers of color, ease their access to publications, and build a platform that is both easy for editors to use and accurately represents the writers."

== Honors ==
In May 2018, Hughes was awarded an honorary doctorate in humane letters from her alma mater, Connecticut College, making her the youngest person ever to receive an honorary doctorate from the school. In 2026, she was a recipient of the Torchbearer "Carrying Change" Awards' Illuminator Award.

== Selected works ==
- "The Secret Fantasies of Adults", The New Yorker, November 3, 2014
- "How Many White People Does It Take to Ruin a Good Joke?", The New Republic, February 6, 2015
- "I Bled Through My Pants on My First Day Work at The New York Times" Elle, October 7, 2015
- "I Dressed Like Cookie for a Week to Get Over My Imposter Syndrome", Cosmopolitan, October 22, 2015
