= David Kaufman (journalist) =

American journalist

David Christopher Kaufman is an American journalist who writes for several publications, including the Financial Times, The New York Times, Details, New York, and Time International. He authored chapter text for PRIDE: Fifty Years of Parades and Protests.

Kaufman graduated from Brandeis University and earned a graduate degree in Journalism from New York University.

Kaufman's background is Ashkenazi Jewish and African-American. He has written about his identity as a gay Black Jew. He is a Zionist.
