= Film Workers for Palestine =

Anti-war organization

Film Workers for Palestine is an organization of professionals in the international film industry opposed to the actions of Israel in the Gaza war. The organization has published an open pledge to boycott Israeli film institutions that are reported to be "implicated in genocide and apartheid against the Palestinian people". Over 5,000 actors, film directors, and other film industry professionals have signed the pledge to boycott such institutions.

== Pledge ==
On 8 September 2025, a pledge was published by Film Workers for Palestine vowing to boycott Israeli film institutions considered complicit in genocide and apartheid. The pledge claims to take inspiration from the Anti-Apartheid Movement that opposed apartheid in South Africa. The pledge had 5,000 signatories by 25 September.

Some notable initial signatories include filmmakers Yorgos Lanthimos, Ava DuVernay, Asif Kapadia, Boots Riley, and Joshua Oppenheimer as well as actors Olivia Colman, Mark Ruffalo, Tilda Swinton, Javier Bardem, Ayo Edebiri, Riz Ahmed, Josh O'Connor, Cynthia Nixon, Julie Christie, Ilana Glazer, Rebecca Hall, Aimee Lou Wood, and Debra Winger. Signatories that joined by 10 September include Joaquin Phoenix, Rooney Mara, Emma Stone, James Schamus, Peter Sarsgaard, Lily Gladstone, Nicola Coughlan, Harris Dickinson, Bowen Yang, Guy Pearce, Jonathan Glazer, Ebon Moss-Bachrach, Fisher Stevens, Abbi Jacobson, Eric Andre, Elliot Page, Payal Kapadia, and Emma D'Arcy. Some actors outside the English-language cinema also signed the pledge, including French actor Félix Maritaud, Argentine actors Nahuel Pérez Biscayart, Mercedes Morán, and Cecilia Roth, and Mexican actor Gael García Bernal.

At the 77th Primetime Emmy Awards, Javier Bardem walked the red carpet wearing a Palestinian keffiyeh. He stated: "Here I am today, denouncing the genocide in Gaza. I am talking about the IAGS, the International Association of Genocide Scholars, who study thoroughly genocide and has declared it is a genocide. That's why we ask for a commercial and diplomatic blockade and also sanctions on Israel to stop the genocide. Free Palestine."

The pledge stated that the targets of the boycott would be organizations such as "festivals, cinemas, broadcasters and production companies" that are seen as "whitewashing or justifying genocide and apartheid and/or partnering with the government committing them". The pledge specifically implicated the Jerusalem Film Festival, the Haifa International Film Festival, Docaviv, and TLVFest as subjects of the boycott. The pledge also stated that Jewish and Israeli film professionals were not the subject of the boycott, and that signatories would continue to work with Jewish and Israeli people.

== Response ==
Following the release of the pledge, some commentators and organizations such as StopAntisemitism falsely claimed that the boycott was targeted against Jews. Paramount Pictures condemned the boycott, saying that "Silencing individual creative artists based on their nationality does not promote better understanding or advance the cause of peace". Film Workers for Palestine responded to Paramount by saying that the boycott does not target individual creative artists, but rather institutions.

In September 2025, the Creative Community for Peace released an open letter rejecting the Film Workers for Palestine's pledge not to cooperate with Israeli film institutions. It was signed by over 1,200 entertainment industry professionals, including Liev Schreiber, Mayim Bialik, Haim Saban, Sharon Osbourne, Gene Simmons, Jennifer Jason Leigh, Greg Berlanti, Howie Mandel, Lisa Edelstein, Erin Foster and Debra Messing.

== See also ==
- Artists4Ceasefire
- Boycott, Divestment and Sanctions
- Disinvestment from Israel
- No Music For Genocide
- Writers Against the War on Gaza
