= National Jewish Advocacy Center =

- המרכז הלאומי לסנגוריה יהודית
- Formation: 2020
- Key people: Mark Goldfeder

The National Jewish Advocacy Center (NJAC) (המרכז הלאומי לסנגוריה יהודית) is a pro-Israel American legal group focused on combatting antisemitism as defined by the International Holocaust Remembrance Alliance (IHRA). NJAC was founded in 2020, and is led by rabbi and lawyer Mark Goldfeder.

== History ==
In February 2026, NJAC acquired the Zachor Legal Institute, a legal think tank.

Following a May 2026 opinion piece published in The New York Times by Nicholas Kristof titled The Silence That Meets the Rape of Palestinians, NJAC represented a shareholder of The New York Times Company in a demand for records from the company's board of directors and Audit Committee.

=== Florida NCPPR v NYTimes ===
In September 2026, Florida's State Board of Administration, which oversees the Florida Retirement System Trust Fund, conservative think tank National Center for Public Policy Research, and the NJAC brought a lawsuit against The New York Times Company on behalf of some of its shareholders, alleging the company's editors and reporters aren't complying with editorial standards and damaging the company's values. The petition cites allegations of The New York Times newsroom employee who raised concerns about "many instances of anti-Israel bias by fellow journalists."

== Activities ==
NJAC has sued on behalf of plaintiffs complaining of antisemitism in the workplace and on university campuses.

NJAC has also used the Freedom of Access to Clinic Entrances (FACE) Act to protect synagogues against protests.
