= Writers Against the War on Gaza =

American advocacy group

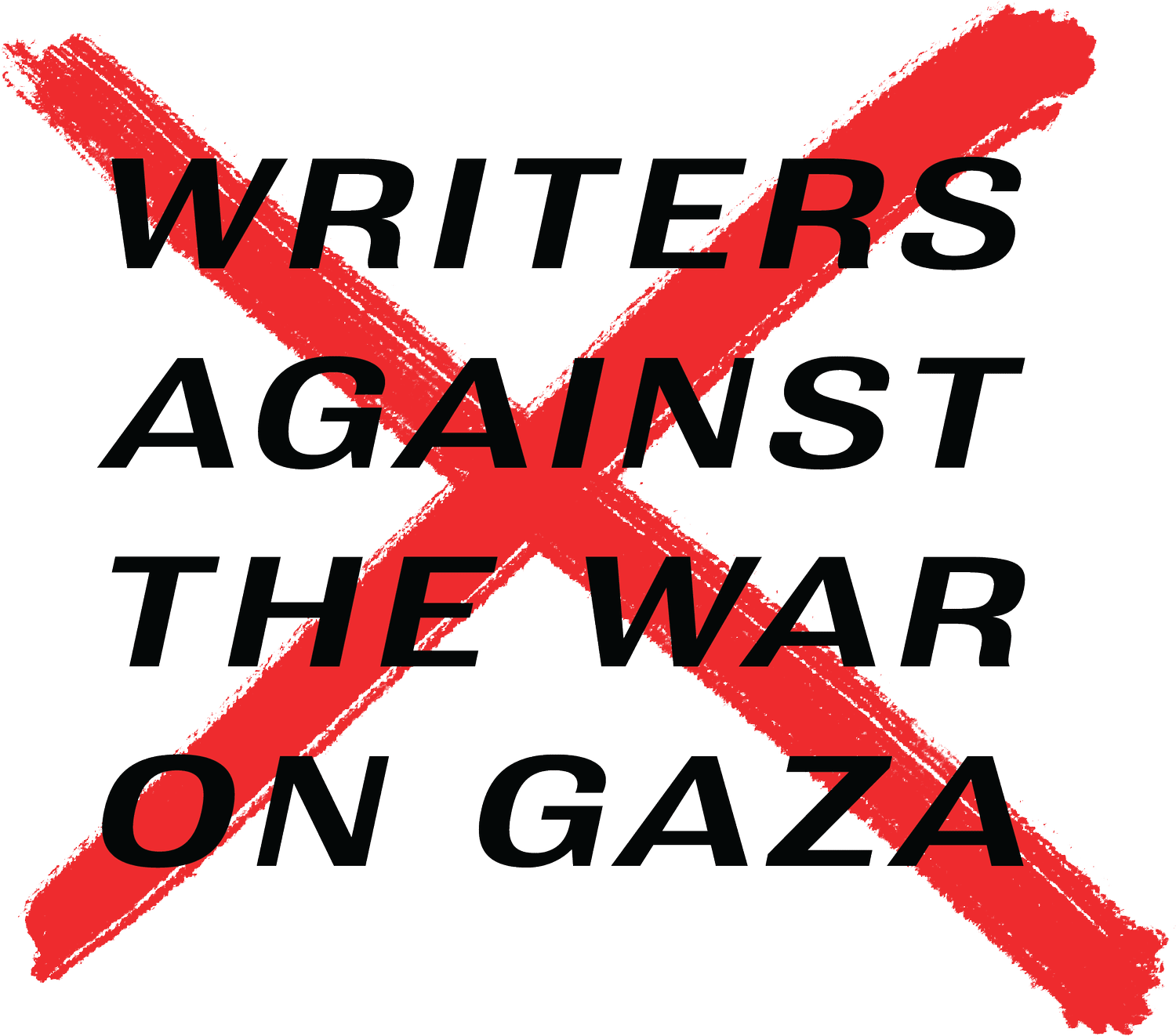
- Nickname: WAWOG
- Formation: 2023
- Location: United States
- Website: www.writersagainstthewarongaza.com

Writers Against the War on Gaza (also known as WAWOG) is a coalition of writers, academics, artists, journalists, and culture workers seeking to protest the Gaza war and Gaza genocide and to mobilize for Palestinian liberation via cultural organizing. Their tactics are based on Vietnam War-era culture worker mobilization, and, in particular, the organization American Writers Against the Vietnam War.

== Founding ==
WAWOG was formed in October 2023 by a group of writers and editors who came together to protest the Gaza war. In an interview with Mother Jones, one of the founding members said that after the October 7 attacks, they began receiving a lot of petitions and open letters in support of Palestine in their inbox. The founding members wanted to create infrastructure to help the aims of the petitions they were signing be realized. On October 26, WAWOG put out their own open letter, "Writers Against the War on Gaza Statement of Solidarity." By November, WAWOG's organizing committee had approximately 30 people.

== Principles ==
WAWOG defines itself as an organization participating in a "cultural boycott" of Israel. They seek to show that Israel's actions in Gaza are "not normal" and to resist the conflation of anti-Zionism with antisemitism. They also want to make Palestinian liberation mainstream, and to pressure the media to cover the Israel-Palestine conflict in a way that uplifts Palestinian voices.

The group's tactics are informed by the Boycott, Divestment, and Sanctions (BDS) movement, a non-violent method that seeks to economically sanction Israel into complying with international law. WAWOG also finds inspiration in the organization ACT UP, which produced art that shed light on the HIV/AIDS epidemic. Actions taken by WAWOG members include quitting positions at publications that members say spread biased or incorrect information about the Gaza war and staging protests of US cultural institutions (such as the New York Times) that members say have similar bias.

== Notable actions ==
=== New York City ===
==== 2023 ====
Initially calling the New York group "Writer's Bloc," WAWOG staged their first sit-in at the New York Times. They carried a banner calling for a ceasefire, distributed a fake newspaper named The New York War Crimes, and read the names of all of the Palestinians killed in Gaza. WAWOG accused the New York Times of being "complicit in laundering genocide." Volume 1, No. 1-3 over 7,000 names, released by the Gaza Health Ministry by October, were printed using a broadsheet format.

"We initially listed the names of martyrs. About 7,000 had just been released by the Gaza Health Ministry in late October and it took us three issues to print all those names. Since then, the breakdown of the health system in Gaza has meant there is no single list of names of people who have been killed by Zionist forces. So we then started using the broadsheet format to print new writing."

On November 23, WAWOG members jumped the barricades at the Macy's Thanksgiving Day Parade and glued their hands to the ground to make themselves more difficult to remove by the New York Police Department. Parade floats navigated around the protesters as they chanted "Free Palestine", poured fake blood on each other and in the street, and opened a large sign that said "Genocide then genocide now."

WAWOG held a vigil for Palestinian journalists killed in the Gaza war on the steps of the New York Public Library on December 19. At the vigil, the writers read out the Palestinian writer and activist Refaat Aleer's poem, "If I Must Die," due to him being slain in the war. They also read out the names of Palestinian journalists who had been killed in Gaza. WAWOG held a similar vigil on January 24, 2024.

==== 2024 ====
On January 8, WAWOG coordinated with Palestinian Youth Movement, The Palestine Right to Return Coalition, Samidoun, Democratic Socialists of America, Jewish Voice for Peace, the Party for Socialism and Liberation, and Critical Resistance to block the Brooklyn Bridge, Manhattan Bridge, Holland Tunnel, and Williamsburg Bridge.

WAWOG protested The New York Times again on February 29 following the release of their article, "Screams Without Words," which alleged targeted rape and sexual violence by Hamas on October 7. They held a press conference in front of the building holding mock-biographies of New York Times authors. WAWOG called to the BDS movement, requesting that supporters follow BDU (Boycott, Divest, and Unsubscribe) from the Times.

On March 14, WAWOG attempted to take the New York Times out of circulation for an entire day. According to an activist at the blockade, the group was trying to take the Times out of circulation because,

"People view it as this repository of objective knowledge, but it's actually at the forefront of manufacturing consent for this war. We want to challenge that, and create a vacuum where other things are possible."

WAWOG members used PVC pipes and chains to link their arms more tightly. The protesters were pressured to leave by NYPD's Strategic Response Group at 3 am, and the paper's distribution was ultimately not disrupted for the day.

Also on March 14, WAWOG members distributed their publication, The New York War Crimes, outside of The New York Times to other people who supported the cause. NYPD arrested 124 people at the protest. WAWOG's website, The New York War Crimes, also launched that day. A detailed historical analysis, The New York Times vs. History, was simultaneously published online. The report reviewed the New York Times’ archive to reveal a record of support for American wars on foreign soil, support for right-wing dictatorships, and U.S.-backed regime-change. Archives included coverage of Iran in 1953, Guatemala in 1954, Brazil in 1964, Iraq in 2003, Libya in 2011, Venezuela and Bolivia in 2019, and Cuba in 2021.

=== Los Angeles ===
WAWOG Los Angeles held a vigil for slain Palestinian writers and journalists on January 18, 2024.

On February 2, 2024, WAWOG protested a PEN America event featuring Mayim Bialik, who supports Israel and does not support the ceasefire movement. WAWOG turned on a speaker and played the names of 13 Palestinian writers and poets killed by the IDF in the war. The Palestinian-American writer Randa Jarrar was removed by security after refusing to leave. WAWOG members signed an open letter to PEN America condemning the hosting of Bialik as well as Jarrar's removal.

Film Workers for Palestine, SAG-AFTRA Members for Ceasefire, and WAWOG held a protest of the Oscars on March 10, 2024.

=== Toronto ===
On March 26, 2024, WAWOG Toronto joined with Film Workers for Palestine, Artists Against Artwashing, and CanLit Responds to denounce Scotiabank for having significant investments in Elbit Systems, an Israeli weapons manufacturer. The campaign they created was called No Arms in the Arts, which pushed for Canadian arts awards to divest from Scotiabank.

== The New York War Crimes ==
WAWOG operates a website titled The New York War Crimes that has printed the following issues:

- Print issue Vol. I . . . No. 1: CEASEFIRE NOW! Honoring Gaza’s dead — and fighting for the living (November 9, 2023)
- Print issue Vol. I . . . No. 2: AS DEATH MOUNTS, STILL NO CEASEFIRE (November 16, 2023)
- Print issue Vol. I . . . No. 3: IN USA, SUPPORT FOR GENOCIDE IS STILL STRONG (November 23, 2023)
- Print issue Vol. I . . . No. 4: MEDIA MANUFACTURES CONSENT FOR GENOCIDE (January 12, 2024)
- Print issue Vol. I . . . No. 5: ALL FOR ALL, “ISRAEL” MUST FALL (January 20, 2024)
- Print issue Vol. II . . . No. 6: STOP THE PRESSES! FREE PALESTINE! (March 14, 2024)
- Print issue Vol. II . . . No. 7: WORKERS OF THE WORLD, STRIKE FOR PALESTINE! (May 1, 2024)
- Print issue Vol. II . . . No. 9: REVOLUTION AND RESISTANCE UNTIL LIBERATION AND RETURN (May 15, 2024)

== Notable supporters ==
- Nana Kwame Adjei-Brenyah
- Jami Attenberg
- Jamel Brinkley
- Alexander Chee
- Ashley C. Ford
- Roxane Gay
- Nan Goldin
- Jazmine Hughes
- Randa Jarrar
- Jamie Lauren Keiles
- Kiese Laymon
- Carmen Maria Machado
- George R.R. Martin
- Daniel José Older
- Morgan Parker
- Deesha Philyaw
- Tommy Pico
- Susan Sarandon
- Michelle Tea
- Jia Tolentino
- Ocean Vuong
- Elissa Washuta
- Lidia Yuknavitch

== See also ==
- Jewish Voice for Peace
- List of The New York Times controversies
- Students for Justice in Palestine
- Within Our Lifetime
- Film Workers for Palestine
