= Jamie Lauren Keiles =

American journalist (born 1992)

- Born: 1992 (age 33–34)
- Education: Central Bucks High School West; University of Chicago
- Occupations: Writer; journalist

Jamie Lauren Keiles (born 1992) is an American writer and journalist. From 2019 to 2023, he was a contributing writer for The New York Times Magazine. He first gained attention as a teenage blogger in 2010 for "Seventeen Magazine Project," a blog chronicling his attempt to follow the advice of Seventeen for 30 days.

== Personal life ==
Keiles grew up in Doylestown, Pennsylvania, where he attended Central Bucks High School West. He graduated from the University of Chicago in 2014. As an undergraduate, he worked for the alternative newspaper the Chicago Weekly. He is transgender and uses he or they pronouns.

== Career ==
In April 2010, at age 18, Keiles launched "The Seventeen Magazine Project", a blog documenting his attempt to follow the advice of Seventeen for 30 days. The project criticized Seventeen for promoting a limited conception of adolescent femininity; the project quickly drew coverage from feminist blogs as well as national outlets, including NPR's All Things Considered and CBC's Q, among others. From 2010 to 2012, Keiles was a writer for Rookie. Between 2015 and 2019, his work appeared in The New York Times, The New Yorker, Vox, and The Awl.

From 2019 to 2023, Keiles was a contributing writer at The New York Times Magazine. In 2022, he began working on a journalistic book entitled The Third Person about nonbinary identity in American, to be published by Farrar, Straus & Giroux in early 2026.
