= Hossam Shabat =

Palestinian journalist (2001–2025)

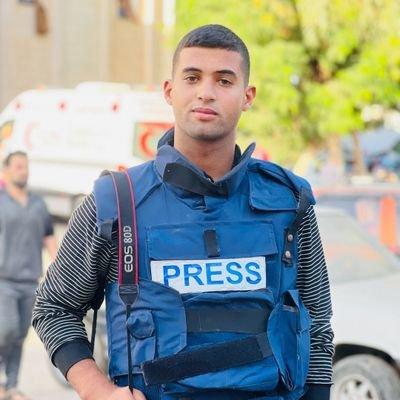
- Born: 10 October 2001; Beit Hanoun, Palestine
- Died: 24 March 2025 (aged 23); Beit Lahia, Gaza Strip, Palestine
- Cause of death: Targeted by Israeli airstrike
- Occupation: Reporter

Hossam Shabat (Arabic: حسام شبات; 10 October 2001 – 24 March 2025) was a Palestinian journalist who reported on the Gaza war as a correspondent for Al Jazeera Mubasher and also contributed to Drop Site News.

Shabat was killed by an Israeli airstrike on 24 March 2025, after Israel ended the ceasefire established in January 2025 by resuming airstrikes on Gaza. Shabat and another Palestinian journalist, Mohammed Mansour, also killed by the Israeli military on 24 March, are among the at least 208 journalists and media workers who have been killed in the Gaza war as of that date. The Israel Defense Forces (IDF), without providing verifiable evidence, had previously accused Shabat and five other Palestinian journalists of being members of the militant groups Hamas and Islamic Jihad, accusations which he denied and said served as threats against his life. Witnesses reported that the attack appeared to be targeted, and the IDF later acknowledged that they had targeted Shabat.

== Early life ==
Shabat was a resident of Gaza City and, prior to the conflict, aspired to build a media and marketing company. He was also involved in the hospitality sector, owning a restaurant that was later destroyed during the war.

== Journalism during the conflict ==
Around 27 October 2024, Shabat described life as a journalist in Gaza as being someone who is "hunted". Shabat faced numerous challenges, including displacement from his home in Beit Hanoun, threats from the Israeli military, the destruction of his family's restaurant, and the loss of 30 family members. Despite these hardships, he continued his reporting, often working on an empty stomach and living in accommodation centers.

== Killing ==
=== Background ===
==== Killing of journalists in the Gaza war ====
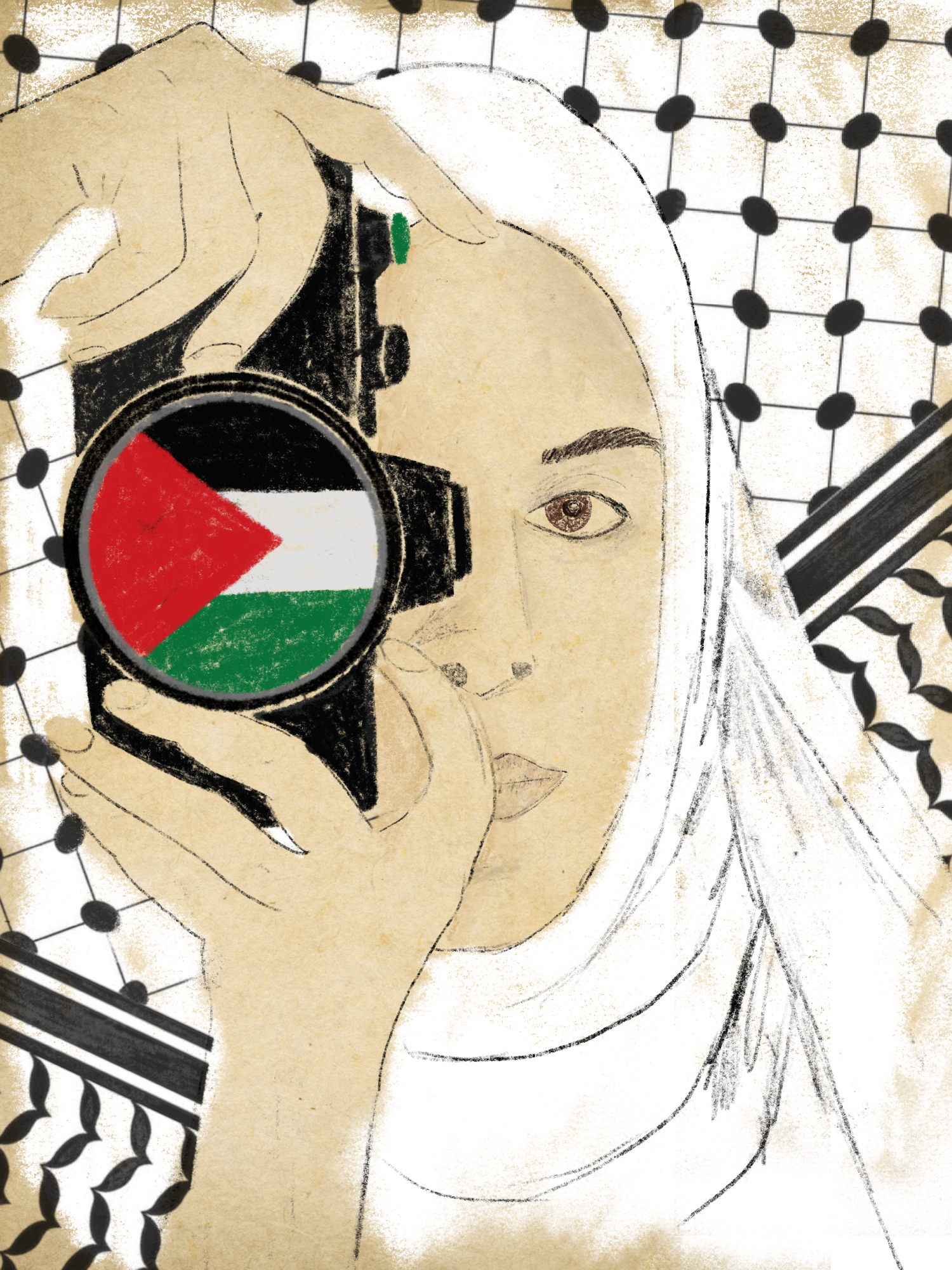
Portrait of photojournalist Fatima Hassouna, by Andrea Ebert. On 16 April 2025, she and ten members of her family, including her pregnant sister, were killed by an Israeli missile. Fatima Hassouna was the protagonist of the documentary Put Your Soul on Your Hand and Walk.

The Gaza war is the deadliest conflict for journalists in history, according to the Costs of War Project. According to the United Nations, the number of Palestinian journalists killed by Israel since the start of the war stood at 242 by 11 August 2025. On the other hand, the Committee to Protect Journalists (CPJ) reported that 192 journalists, at least 184 of them Palestinian, had been killed by Israel as of 10 August 2025. The International Federation of Journalists (IFJ) reported the killing of at least 180 Palestinian journalists and media workers by Israel as of 11 August 2025. A July 2024 count by the Gaza Government Media Office placed the number of Palestinian journalists killed by Israel at 160. By January 2025, Israel had reportedly killed 42 more Palestinian journalists to raise this number to 202, and by July 2025, it had reportedly killed 15 more journalists to raise the number to 217. An aggregation of data from multiple sources, including from the CPJ and the IFJ, which listed the names of all journalists hitherto reported to have been killed by Israel concluded that, by 11 August 2025, Israel had killed up to 274 journalists, with 269 of them Palestinian.

The head of the Committee to Protect Journalists stated in 2024, "Israel's war on Gaza is more deadly to journalists than any previous war". Israeli airstrikes additionally damaged or destroyed an estimated 48 media facilities in Gaza. Reporters Without Borders has reported that the Israeli army intentionally targeted Palestinian journalists. The Guardian stated that contrary to international law, Israel had targeted Hamas-affiliated Palestinian journalists despite their non-involvement in combat, thus disputing Israel's denial of targeting journalists. In 2023, nearly 75% of journalists killed worldwide were Palestinians who had died in Israel’s war in Gaza. According to the Committee to Protect Journalists, Israel was the second worst country in the world for allowing the murderers of journalists to go unpunished. In December 2025, Reporters Without Borders declared Israel as the biggest killer and "the worst enemy" of journalists of 2025, with nearly half of all journalists who were killed of that year, were murdered by the IDF.

==== Israeli accusations of involvement with Hamas ====
According to +972 Magazine, a special unit in the Israeli military called the "Legitimization Cell" works to identify journalists in Gaza that it can depict as undercover Hamas operatives to render them legitimate targets to kill, in an attempt to stifle media coverage of its activities in Gaza and quell international outrage over Israel's killing of journalists.

On 23 October 2024, the IDF accused six Palestinian journalists working for Al Jazeera in Gaza, among them Shabat, of being fighters in Hamas and Palestinian Islamic Jihad. Al Jazeera denied these accusations and described them as based on "fabricated evidence". The IDF said that documents it had found in Gaza proved that Shabat was a sniper in Hamas' Beit Hanoun Battalion. Shabat said these were fabricated dossiers designed to frame him as a "terrorist" and that accusations were to make him and his colleagues "killable targets", adding that they constituted death threats against him. According to Reporters Without Borders (RSF), the documents published by the Israeli military on Shabat "severely lacked proof these journalists were affiliated with the military and in no way granted a licence to kill". RSF said the accusations against Shabat were part of an "all-too-familiar pattern [which] fuels the unprecedented massacre of journalists happening in Gaza". In July 2024, Israel killed Ismail al-Ghoul, another Al Jazeera journalist in Gaza that it had accused of being affiliated with Hamas.

=== Death ===
On 24 March 2025, Shabat was killed in an Israeli airstrike that hit his car near Beit Lahia in northern Gaza. Witnesses reported that the attack appeared to be targeted. His death occurred on the same day as another Palestinian journalist, Mohammed Mansour, who was killed in a separate Israeli attack in southern Gaza.

On the following day, the IDF confirmed that it had deliberately targeted Shabat, accusing him of taking part in attacks on Israel without providing verifiable evidence.

Shabat's colleague Anas Al-Sharif participated in the funeral procession. He told Drop Site News that he was determined to continue reporting despite Israeli threats. In August 2025, Al-Sharif was himself killed in a targeted strike by the IDF along with four other journalists and two civilians during the Gaza War.

== See also ==
- Gaza genocide
- List of journalists killed in the Gaza war
