= Assassination of Anas Al-Sharif =

2025 killing of a Palestinian journalist

- Part of the Gaza war
- Location: 31°31′27″N 34°26′39″E; Al-Shifa Hospital, Gaza City, Gaza Strip, Palestine
- Date: 10 August 2025; 14 months ago 23:22 (EEST)
- Attack type: Airstrike
- Deaths: 7 (including Anas Al-Sharif)
- Perpetrator: Israel Defense Forces

On 10 August 2025, Anas Al-Sharif, a Palestinian journalist working for Al Jazeera, was assassinated in an Israeli airstrike on a media tent outside Al-Shifa Hospital in Gaza City. The strike also killed four other journalists – Mohammed Qreiqeh, Ibrahim Zaher, Mohammed Noufal, and Moamen Aliwa – along with two others, including Al-Sharif's nephew.

The attack was widely condemned by Al Jazeera, press freedom organizations, and Palestinian authorities as a deliberate assault on journalists, while the Israel Defense Forces (IDF) claimed Al-Sharif was a Hamas operative – an allegation rejected by Al Jazeera and the Committee to Protect Journalists (CPJ). The assassination occurred amidst the ongoing Gaza war and was described as part of a broader pattern of violence against journalists in Gaza.

== Background ==
=== Gaza war ===
The broader context of the strike was Israel's military campaign in Gaza, launched in response to the October 7 attacks, which killed approximately 1,200 people and took over 200 hostages. By August 2025, the war had resulted more than 71,000 Palestinian deaths, widespread destruction, and a humanitarian crisis, including famine conditions in parts of Gaza.

Journalists in Gaza face extreme risks, with the CPJ saying that Israel was responsible for nearly 70% of journalists killed globally in 2024, while Reporters Without Borders (RSF) had reported over 200 journalist deaths in Gaza since October 2023. The targeting of journalists, combined with Israel's restrictions on foreign media access to Gaza, was said to create an "information blackout" in parts of the territory. According to +972 Magazine, the IDF established a "legitimisation cell" after 7 October 2023 whose purpose was to find links between Palestinian journalists and Hamas in order to justify their targeting.

A paper by the Watson School for International and Public Affairs highlighted that the Gaza war "killed more journalists than the U.S. Civil War, World Wars I and II, the Korean War, the Vietnam War (including the conflicts in Cambodia and Laos), the wars in Yugoslavia in the 1990s and 2000s, and the post-9/11 war in Afghanistan, combined".

On 1 April 2024, the Israeli parliament passed a law that would shut down Al Jazeera broadcasts in Israel. Prime Minister Benjamin Netanyahu accused the outlet of "actively participating in the October 7 massacre and inciting against IDF soldiers". Israeli authorities also cited Al Jazeera's alleged links to Hamas. The Israeli government issued a temporary order to shut down Al Jazeera's operations in May 2024, claiming it had harmed "national interests". The ban was extended in June 2024, with the Tel Aviv District Court claiming a "direct and causal connection" between those who had carried out "terror attacks" in Israel and their consumption of Al Jazeera content. It also reasserted an alleged "close connection" between the media outlet and Hamas.

=== Anas Al-Sharif ===
Anas Al-Sharif, born in Jabalia refugee camp in the Gaza Strip, was a well-known correspondent for Al Jazeera Arabic, known for his on-the-ground reporting during the Gaza war that began following the 7 October attacks. His coverage included interviews with residents affected by the conflict and footage of the aftermath of Israeli airstrikes, earning him a significant following, with over 500,000 followers on his X account. Al-Sharif was part of a Reuters photography team that won the 2024 Pulitzer Prize for Breaking News Photography for their coverage of the war.

On 23 October 2024, the IDF released documents naming Al-Sharif among six Al Jazeera journalists it claimed were operatives of Hamas and the Palestinian Islamic Jihad. The IDF alleged that Al-Sharif served as the leader of a rocket launching squad and was a member of a Nukhba force company in Hamas's East Jabalia Battalion. Al Jazeera dismissed the reports as "fabricated accusations". The Guardian describes the report as "an unconvincing dossier of unverified evidence" and said the IDF has not explained how al-Sharif was able to be both a military commander and regular broadcaster simultaneously. According to BBC News, Al-Sharif had worked with a Hamas media group prior to the October 7 attacks, but can be heard criticizing Hamas in some of his social media videos before his death.

Before his death, Al-Sharif had faced threats from Israeli authorities. In July 2025, the CPJ and UN Special Rapporteur Irene Khan concerned his safety, citing an Israeli military smear campaign accusing him of being a Hamas fighter. These allegations, which Al-Sharif and Al Jazeera dismissed as baseless, were seen by press freedom groups as an attempt to justify targeting him. In December 2023, an Israeli airstrike killed his father, Jamal Al-Sharif, in their family home in Jabalia, after Al-Sharif received threats from Israeli officers to cease his coverage.

According to his brother Mohamed, Al-Sharif was offered safe passage out of Gaza with his wife, children, and extended family if he agreed to stop reporting, but he refused. In a video interview published in August 2025, Mohamed described the offer, made four days before Al-Sharif's death, as the latest he had received. Despite being aware of an imminent full-scale Israeli invasion of Gaza City, Al-Sharif chose to remain, stating that he would not leave while others in Gaza continued to suffer.

== Airstrike ==
On 10 August 2025, the IDF conducted a targeted airstrike on a tent designated for journalists near the main gate of Al-Shifa Hospital in Gaza, where Al-Sharif and his colleagues were sheltering. The attack killed seven people, including Al-Sharif; Al Jazeera correspondent Mohammed Qreiqeh; and Al Jazeera cameramen Ibrahim Zaher, Mohammed Noufal, and Moamen Aliwa. Al-Sharif's nephew, who was studying journalism, was also among the victims. The strike damaged part of the hospital's emergency department. Al-Sharif had posted on social media minutes before his death, reporting intense Israeli bombardment in Gaza City. Wadi Abu al-Saud, a Palestinian journalist who was near the tent at the time of the airstrike, said it occurred at 11:22 pm.

The IDF later confirmed the strike, describing Al-Sharif as a Hamas "terrorist" who "posed as a journalist for the Al Jazeera network operative". The IDF reiterated its allegations that Al-Sharif was a Hamas cell leader in charge of rocket launching. The IDF provided no justification for killing any of the other Al Jazeera journalists. Jodie Ginsberg, CEO of the CPJ, disputed the IDF's accusation and evidence, saying: "International law is very clear on this point that the only individuals who are legitimate targets during a war are active combatants. Having worked as a media advisor for Hamas, or indeed for Hamas currently, does not make you an active combatant." The IDF's swift claim of responsibility was unusual, as it typically delays or avoids acknowledging strikes that kill journalists.

== Reactions ==
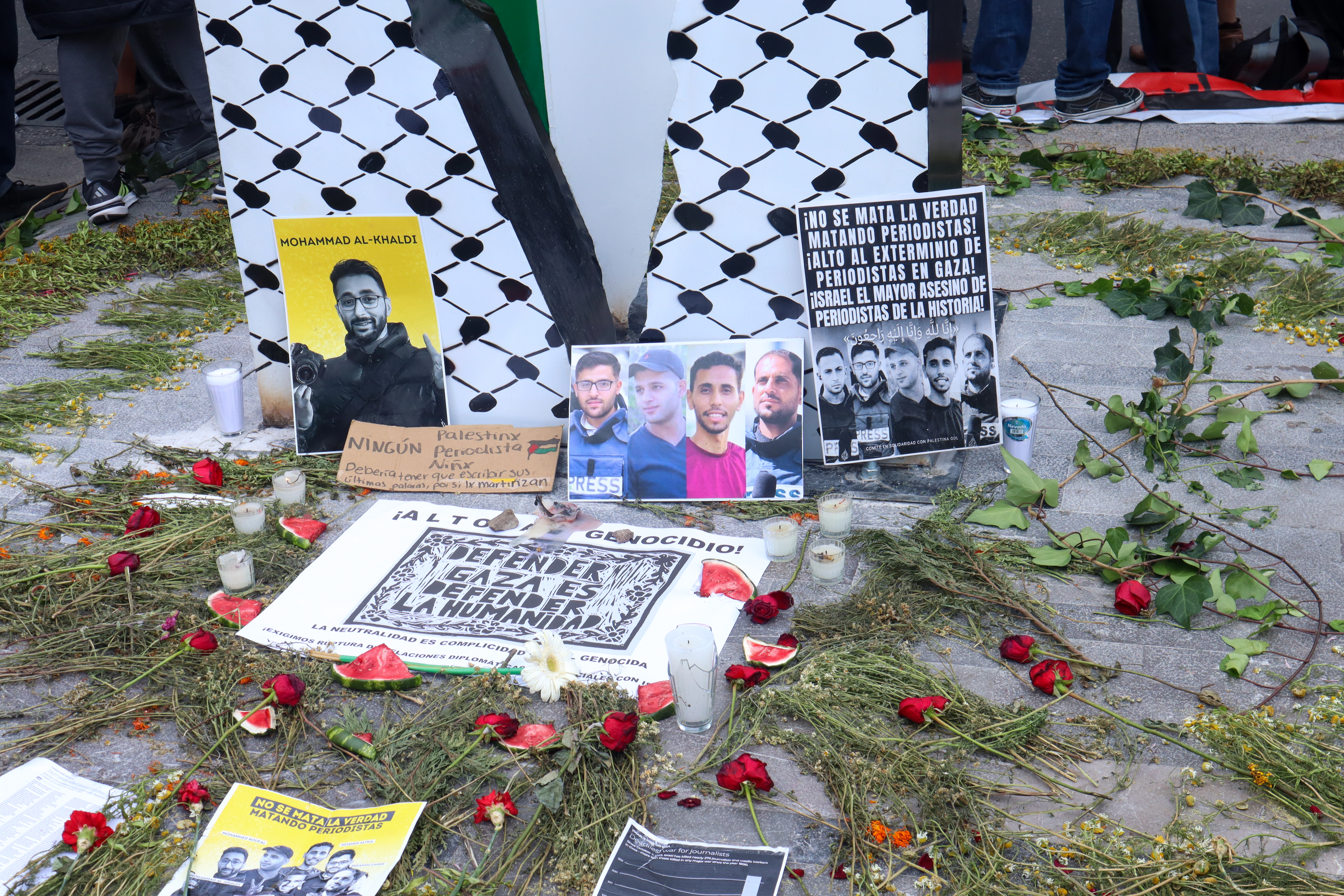
Memorial to Al-Sharif and the journalists killed alongside him. Mexico City, 17 August 2025

=== Media and press freedom organizations ===
Al Jazeera Media Network condemned the strike as a "premeditated assassination" and "yet another blatant and premeditated attack on press freedom", noting that Al-Sharif and his colleagues were among the few journalists still reporting from Gaza. The Qatari network accused Israel of attempting to suppress coverage of its military actions. Al Jazeera managing editor Mohamed Mawad said that Al-Sharif's killing followed a pattern of "degrading, delegitimizing, smearing, and then killing" that had been practiced against other Palestinian journalists.

The Palestinian Journalists' Syndicate described it as a "bloody crime", and Hamas suggested it signaled an impending Israeli invasion of Gaza City. Press freedom organizations, including the CPJ, RSF, and the International Federation of Journalists reiterated that journalists are civilians under international law and must not be targeted. According to Sara Qudah of the CPJ, "Israel's pattern of labeling journalists as militants without providing credible evidence raises serious questions about its intent and respect for press freedom", and that "Israel wiped out an entire news crew. It has made no claims that any of the other journalists were terrorists." RSF released a statement condemning the killings, stating that Israel's targeted killings of journalists "under the guise of terrorism charges" were "designed to conceal the crimes committed by its army" and calling for an emergency meeting of the United Nations Security Council to address the issue.

=== Political and diplomatic responses ===
==== Palestinian ====
The Palestinian mission to the United Nations accused Israel of "deliberately assassinating" al-Sharif and Qreiqeh, describing them as among the "last remaining journalists" in Gaza. Hamas said it was "a barbaric crime that surpasses all limits of fascism and criminality", describing Al-Sharif as a "martyr" and "a model of the free journalist, documenting the crime of starvation and showing the world the scenes of famine imposed by the occupation on our people in Gaza". The Palestinian Islamic Jihad condemned Al-Sharif's assassination as a "heinous war crime committed by the usurping entity in full view of the entire world," and warned that Israel is paving the way for the next phase of its assault by "targeting journalists who expose its crimes and massacres to the world." The Popular Front for the Liberation of Palestine stated that the killing of the journalists serves as "a dangerous indicator of the occupation's intent to commit the most heinous atrocities in Gaza."

==== Others ====
- Iran: Ministry of Foreign Affairs spokesman Esmaeil Baghaei Hamaneh called on the world to "hold [Israel] accountable" after the killing of the five Al Jazeera staff.
- Qatar: Prime Minister and Minister for Foreign Affairs Sheikh Mohammed bin Abdulrahman bin Jassim Al Thani wrote on social media that the "deliberate targeting of journalists by Israel in the Gaza Strip reveals how these crimes are beyond imagination, amid the inability of the int'l community & its laws to stop this tragedy". He added: "May God have mercy on journalists Anas Al-Sharif, Mohammed Qreiqeh, & their colleagues."
- United Kingdom: A spokesperson for Prime Minister Keir Starmer said that the government was "gravely concerned by the repeated targeting of journalists in Gaza."
- European Union: High Representative of the Union for Foreign Affairs and Security Policy Kaja Kallas called on Israel to "provide clear evidence, in the respect of rule of law" with respect to their allegation that Al-Sharif was a Hamas operative, in order "to avoid targeting of journalists".
- United Nations: Secretary-General António Guterres condemned the killing of the journalists and called for an "independent and impartial investigation", according to a statement released by his spokesperson Stéphane Dujarric. UNESCO director-general Audrey Azoulay also condemned the attack, while the United Nations' human rights office described it as violating international law. UNRWA head Philippe Lazzarini said, "The Israeli Army continues to silence voices reporting atrocities from Gaza." UNHCR also issued a statement condemning the killings on X, saying it was "grave breach of international humanitarian law" and called for "immediate, safe & unhindered access to Gaza for all journalists."

== Aftermath ==
Following his assassination, a pre-written statement, described as Al-Sharif's "last will and testament", was posted on his X account. It read in part, "If these words reach you, know that Israel has succeeded in killing me and silencing my voice." The post expressed his grief over not seeing his children grow up and described witnessing the killing of children in Gaza by Israeli bombs. It ended with a plea to "not forget Gaza" and to "not forget me in your sincere prayers for forgiveness and acceptance."

A funeral was held the following morning for the five journalists at Al-Shifa Hospital, attended by hundreds of mourners, with the bodies wrapped in white sheets. Diplomatic relations between Israel and Qatar (Al Jazeera's host country) soured following the attack.

=== Investigation ===
The CPJ said that Israel provided no "credible evidence" to support the accusation that Al-Sharif was a Hamas operative. Al Jazeera and media watchdogs accused Israel of using unproven allegations to justify the killing, a tactic the CPJ described as a "smear campaign" to "manufacture consent" for targeting journalists. The lack of transparency and the pattern of journalist deaths raised calls for independent investigations into the strike. The International Criminal Court (ICC) had previously been urged to investigate attacks on journalists in Gaza as potential war crimes, but no specific probe into Al-Sharif's killing was confirmed since his murder.

Four days after Al-Sharif's assassination on 14 August 2025, Israeli news magazines +972 and Local Call revealed that the IDF operates a specific unit, the Legitimization Cell, tasked with finding evidence that could be used to link journalists including Al-Sharif to Hamas, in order to justify their killing for public relations purposes.

The Hind Rajab Foundation and Palestinian Centre for Human Rights have said they will submit a complaint to the ICC over the attack that killed Al-Sharif. They accuse those in the chain of command involved in the strike of war crimes and genocide. Those accused include IDF Chief of Staff Eyal Zamir, Air Force Commander Tomer Bar, and IDF Arabic-language spokesman Avichay Adraee.

== See also ==
- Executions and assassinations during the Gaza war
- Killing of Ismail al-Ghoul
- Killing of Shireen Abu Akleh
- List of journalists killed in the Gaza war
- War crimes in the Gaza war
