= Killing of journalists in the Gaza war =

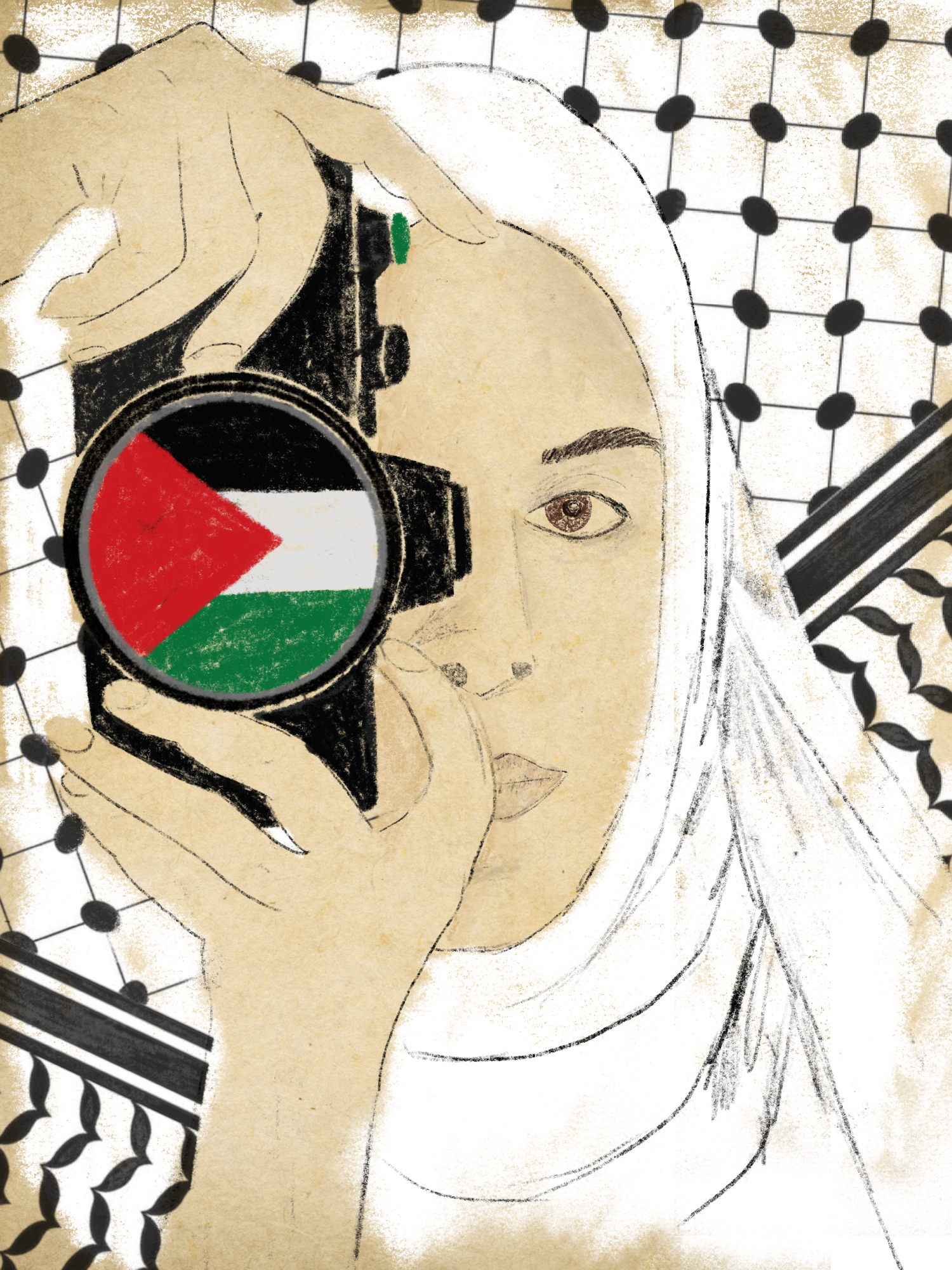
Portrait of photojournalist Fatima Hassouna, by Andrea Ebert. On 16 April 2025, she and ten members of her family, including her pregnant sister, were killed by an Israeli missile. Fatima Hassouna was the protagonist of the documentary Put Your Soul on Your Hand and Walk.

According to the United Nations, the number of Palestinian journalists killed by Israel since the start of the Gaza war stood at 242 by 11 August 2025. On the other hand, the Committee to Protect Journalists (CPJ) reported that 192 journalists, at least 184 of them Palestinian, had been killed by Israel as of 10 August 2025. The International Federation of Journalists (IFJ) reported the killing of at least 180 Palestinian journalists and media workers by Israel as of 11 August 2025. A July 2024 count by the Gaza Government Media Office placed the number of Palestinian journalists killed by Israel at 160. By January 2025, Israel had reportedly killed 42 more Palestinian journalists to raise this number to 202, and by July 2025, it had reportedly killed 15 more journalists to raise the number to 217. An aggregation of data from multiple sources, including from the CPJ and the IFJ, which listed the names of all journalists hitherto reported to have been killed by Israel concluded that, by 11 August 2025, Israel had killed up to 274 journalists, with 269 of them Palestinian. Subsequently the Committee to Protect Journalists revised the count and removed 19 individuals who had engaged in combat from the list.

The head of the Committee to Protect Journalists stated in 2024, "Israel's war on Gaza is more deadly to journalists than any previous war". Israeli airstrikes additionally damaged or destroyed an estimated 48 media facilities in Gaza. Reporters Without Borders has reported that the Israeli army intentionally targeted Palestinian journalists. The Guardian stated that contrary to international law, Israel had targeted Hamas-affiliated Palestinian journalists despite their non-involvement in combat, thus disputing Israel's denial of targeting journalists. In 2023, nearly 75% of journalists killed worldwide were Palestinians who had died in Israel’s war in Gaza. According to the Committee to Protect Journalists, Israel was the second worst country in the world for allowing the murderers of journalists to go unpunished. In December 2025, Reporters Without Borders declared Israel as the biggest killer and "the worst enemy" of journalists of 2025, with nearly half of all journalists who were killed of that year, were murdered by the IDF.

UNESCO awarded its 2024 World Press Freedom Prize to the Palestinian journalists of Gaza.

== Killing of journalists by Israeli forces ==
After the October 7 attacks, a journalist named Omar Abu Shawish was killed in Gaza.

The Hajji Tower airstrike destroyed an apartment block housing journalists' offices on 10 October 2023, killing at least three journalists along with civilians. Salam Khalil, the head of the Gaza Journalists Syndicate's Committee of Women Journalists, was buried under the rubble of her home together with her family in an Israeli strike on the same day and presumed dead. She was subsequently found to be alive with her children.

Turkish public broadcaster TRT World released footage on 17 November 2023 showing the Israeli police attacking their news crew, leading the Turkish minister of communications Fahrettin Altun to say, "This ugly attack has added a new embarrassment to Israel's record on press freedom." On 19 November, six media professionals were killed by Israeli forces in just 24 hours. On 3 December, the Committee to Protect Journalists stated 54 Palestinian journalists had been killed in the war thus far. On 14 December, the United Nations released a statement that said, "Gaza has seemingly become the deadliest place for journalists – and their families – in the world." Following an Israeli attack on a journalists' tent at the Al-Aqsa Hospital on 31 March 2024, Al Jazeera English stated, "Journalists have been systematically targeted throughout this conflict."

Journalist Fadi al-Wahidi was shot in the neck in October 2024 by Israeli forces and fell into a coma while awaiting approval for a medical evacuation.

Two journalists from the Palestine Today News Agency were killed on 8 April 2025 and one later died of his wounds after an Israeli strike on a press tent near Nasser Medical Complex.

Palestinian photojournalist Fatima Hassouna was killed on 16 April 2025 along with ten members of her family in an Israeli airstrike on their home in Gaza City. She became the subject of the documentary film Put Your Soul on Your Hand and Walk, selected for the ACID film programme shown during the 2025 Cannes Film Festival. The attack occurred one day after her documentary's selection for Cannes was announced.

=== Assassinations of journalists by the IDF ===
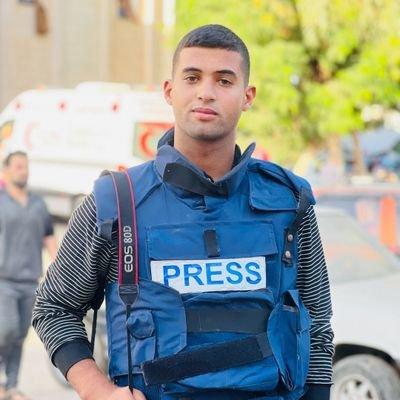
Al Jazeera's correspondent Hossam Shabat was assassinated by Israel on 24 March 2025

"Language makes genocide justifiable. A reason why we are still being bombed after 243 days is because of The New York Times and most Western media."

— Hossam Shabat, a Palestinian journalist accused by Israel of being a member of Hamas and killed in an airstrike 24 March 2025

The Israeli army has, by its own admission, deliberately assassinated journalists during the Gaza war, including Ismail al-Ghoul, Ramil al Refee, Hamza Dahdouh, Hossam Shabat, and Hassan Aslih. During the conflict, Reporters Without Borders (RSF) claimed that the Israeli army had deliberately targeted journalists.

The intentional targeting of journalists is a war crime. The killing of journalists by Israeli forces in Gaza had been a recurring issue, with previous incidents in 2018 and 2021. Earlier in 2023, the Committee to Protect Journalists (CPJ) released a report stating that 20 journalists had been killed by Israeli military fire since 2001, for which "to date, no one has been held accountable".

– Hossam Shabat, a Palestinian journalist accused by Israel being a member of Hamas and killed in an Israeli airstrike 24 March 2025 An investigation by The Guardian in June 2024 disputed Israel's denial of targeting media personnel, citing that some in the Israeli military have viewed journalists Hamas or its affiliates media as legitimate targets. At least 23 journalists who worked for the Al-Aqsa media network had been killed by the Israeli military in the Gaza Strip since 7 October 2023, according to ARIJ, a Jordanian media non-profit. An Israeli military spokesperson confirmed that Israel does not differentiate between media workers and militants working for Hamas, a statement which the Guardian said had raised alarm among legal experts, as under the laws of war journalists are protected unless they participate in combat operations. The UN’s special rapporteur on the protection of the right to freedom of opinion and expression, Irene Khan, stated that Israel had "spread disinformation about journalists being linked to militants" and that it failed to prove such claims. ARIJ surveyed 200 Gaza-based journalists, who almost all had been displaced, and reported that their homes had been bombed while sleeping with their families.

==== Ismail Abu Omar ====
According to Israel, Ismail Abu Omar, a journalist with Al Jazeera, was a deputy company commander in a Hamas battalion and participated in the 7 October attacks; during the attacks he shared a video in which he can be heard saying "The brothers advanced, 'Masha'Allah' may God bless". Abu Omar, along with camera man Ahmad Matar, was wounded in a drone strike on 13 February; Al Jazeera denied and condemned the Israeli accusations, stating "Al Jazeera Media Network rejects the Israeli occupation forces’ attempt to justify the killing and targeting of journalists. The Network condemns the accusations against its journalists and recalls Israel's long record of lies and fabrication of evidence through which it seeks to hide its heinous crimes."

==== Mohammed Washah and Amal El Shamali ====
During operations in Northern Gaza, Israel alleged that they recovered documents revealing that Mohammed Washah, a journalist with Al Jazeera, was a commander in Hamas' anti-tank unit, and did research and development for their air unit. According to The Times of Israel, Israel released images that appeared to show Washah training with anti-tank weaponry, as well as working with others weapons and drones. Reporters Without Borders noted that Washah is the second journalist killed by the Israeli army since the start of the ceasefire, following Amal El Shamali, killed by a drone on 9 March 2026.

==== Anas Al-Sharif ====
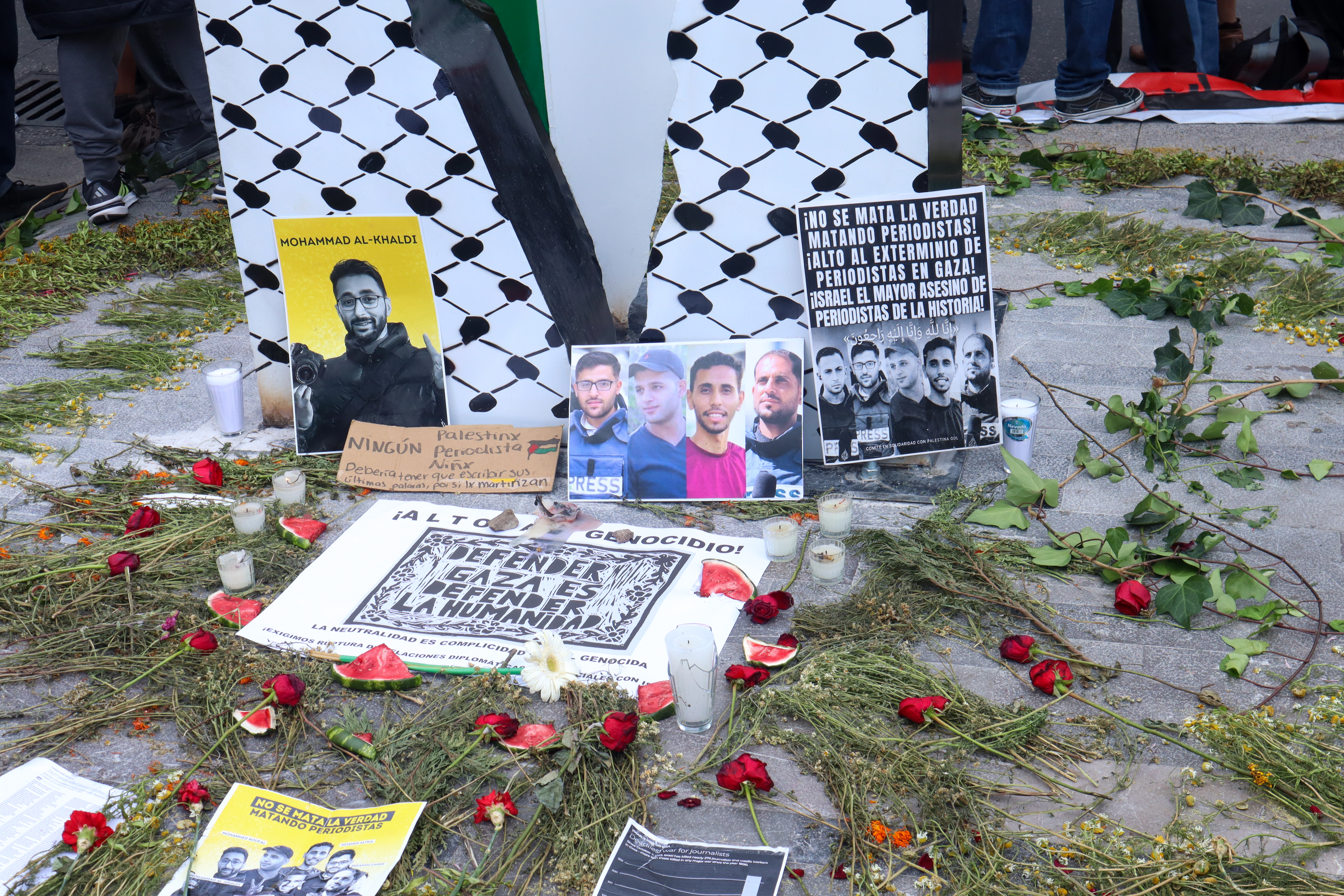
Photos of Palestinian journalists killed on 10 August 2025

On 10 August 2025, Anas Al-Sharif, a Palestinian journalist working for Al Jazeera, was assassinated in an Israeli airstrike on a media tent outside Al-Shifa Hospital in Gaza City. The strike also killed four other journalists – Mohammed Qreiqeh, Ibrahim Zaher, Mohammed Noufal, and Moamen Aliwa – along with two others, including Al-Sharif's nephew.

The attack was widely condemned by Al Jazeera, press freedom organizations, and Palestinian authorities as a deliberate assault on journalists, while the Israel Defense Forces (IDF) claimed Al-Sharif was a Hamas operative – an allegation rejected by Al Jazeera and the Committee to Protect Journalists (CPJ). The assassination occurred amidst the ongoing Gaza war and was described as part of a broader pattern of violence against journalists in Gaza.

=== Hajji Tower airstrike ===
Hajji Tower airstrike
- Part of the Gaza war
- Type: Airstrike
- Location: Gaza Strip
- Date: October 10, 2023; 3 years ago
- Executed by: Israel Defense Forces
- Casualties: 3+ killed Dozens injured

Israeli aircraft bombed a residential building called Hajji Tower in the Gaza Strip on 10 October 2023. According to the Palestinian Press Union, four journalists covering the evacuation of a nearby building were killed, and an unknown number of people were injured. Journalists were present after a resident in a nearby building had reported receiving a phone call from the Israeli military warning of an imminent strike, and the building was being evacuated. The strike hit another building closer to the journalists. Hisham al-Nawajha sustained severe injuries and later died at Al-Shifa Medical Complex.

=== August 2025 Nasser Hospital strikes ===
On 25 August 2025, an Israeli double tap strike hit Nasser Hospital, killing at least 20 people, including medics and five journalists. Most of the deaths were caused by the second strike. Israeli Prime Minister Benjamin Netanyahu's office said that Israel "deeply regrets" the strike.

=== Killing of journalists' families ===
In addition to journalists killed while reporting, Palestinian journalists and media organizations have reported extensive casualties among journalists' family members. According to the Palestinian Journalists Syndicate, more than 700 relatives of Palestinian journalists have been killed in Gaza during the war. The syndicate stated that the figure reflects cumulative family losses over time and highlights the broader humanitarian impact of the conflict on journalists and their families.

Earlier in the conflict, the syndicate stated on 4 February 2024 that at least 70 journalists had lost close family members, indicating that multiple journalists were affected, in some cases involving more than one relative.

Nine family members of CNN producer Ibrahim Dahman were killed in an Israeli airstrike in northern Gaza on 4 December. On 11 December, an airstrike on the home of journalist Anas Al-Sharif resulted in the death of his father. On 8 January 2024, the mother of Al Arabiya journalist Ahmad al-Batta, and the wife and children of journalist Sameer Radi, were killed in airstrikes. On 28 February, a Palestinian journalist stated that an Israeli bombing had killed his pregnant wife, three-year-old son, and 20 other people. Hussein Jaber, an UNRWA photographer, stated that his five-year-old daughter was killed while his family was evacuating Gaza City in December 2023, stating, "Heavy gunfire broke out, and I saw how Salma was hit in the neck in front of my eyes".

==== Killing of Wael Dahdouh's family ====
Several members of the family of Al Jazeera Arabic's Gaza bureau chief Wael Dahdouh were killed in an Israeli airstrike on 25 October in the Nuseirat refugee camp, south of Wadi Gaza, where they had been sheltering after following the Israeli order for Palestinian civilians to move south from northern Gaza. Al Jazeera condemned the killings, calling it an "indiscriminate attack". Dahdouh, speaking to Al Jazeera, said "There is no safe place in Gaza at all". The Israeli army confirmed it had conducted an airstrike in the area near where Dahdouh's family had been sheltering, saying they were targeting "Hamas terrorist infrastructure". Dahdouh himself was later injured in an Israeli missile strike in Khan Younis while covering the Haifa School airstrike.

Dahdouh's son Hamza al-Dahdouh, also a journalist, was killed with a colleague by an Israeli airstrike on their vehicle in Khan Younis on 7 January 2024. Reporters Without Borders stated it appeared a single rocket had fallen on Dahdouh's car. The IDF said that the pair were traveling with a "terror operative" who was operating a drone and that they "identified and struck a terrorist who operated an aircraft in a way that put IDF forces at risk". According to the Washington Post, the IDF changed their statement the following day, when IDF spokesperson Daniel Hagari said that their use of a drone to film made them appear to be terrorists. After a March 2024 investigation, The Washington Post concluded that there were "no indications" that Dahdouh had been "operating as anything other than a journalist that day" because experts said there was no evidence of any "military deployments or militant activity" in the vicinity of the rubble that eleven journalists had traveled from Rafah to report on after an Israeli airstrike earlier in the day. In a statement, US Secretary of State Antony Blinken stated he was "deeply sorry" for the "unimaginable loss". Wael Dahdouh stated, "Hamza was not part of me. He was all of me."

=== Membership in Hamas and other groups ===
Israel has claimed on multiple occasions that the journalists it has killed were affiliated with militant groups. The Intelligence and Terrorism Information Center said that about 60 percent of the journalists killed in Gaza between the start of the Gaza war and February 18, 2024 had such affiliations. Two of those killed in this period had been mourned by friends as members of the "resistance" and "jihad fighters" and a third had been part of Hamas' political leadership.

The Al Jazeera Media Network rejected Israel's "unfounded allegations" against its journalists. Reporters Without Borders found inconsistencies with Israel's allegations and stated, "Journalists are not terrorists and the mere publication of these documents doesn’t constitute proof of their affiliation nor does it give Israel the license to kill."

The Committee to Protect Journalists also expressed doubts about the allegations, but later began a review of its list of killed journalists and removed 19 names of individuals who had engaged in combat after Hamas and Palestinian Islamic Jihad released obituaries identifying them as combatants. It also removed three more names of individuals wrongly classified as media workers and reinstated six previously removed journalists, including two Israeli ones.

== Killing of journalists by Palestinian forces ==
Four Israeli journalists and photographers were killed on 7 October amid the Hamas attack on Israel, including Yaniv Zohar, a photographer for Israel Hayom, who was killed along with his wife and two daughters in Nahal Oz attack; Roy Edan, a photographer for Yedioth Ahronoth, who was killed in the Kfar Aza massacre; and two editors who were killed in the Nova music festival massacre: Shai Regev, an entertainment news editor for Ma'ariv, and Ayelet Arnin, an editor for KAN.

Israeli photojournalists driving in a convoy towards Re'im were attacked by Hamas militants, as they were documenting the scene of one of the massacres. The journalists were rescued by IDF reservists after a firefight that lasted roughly half an hour.

== Other violence against journalists ==
After the October 7 attacks, Israeli police damaged equipment of a television crew reporting in Ashkelon.

Alongside those killed, missing or detained, the Committee to Protect Journalists has received numerous reports of damage done to journalists' offices and homes, and estimates that "48 media facilities in Gaza have been hit or destroyed". On 5 February 2024, a Palestinian journalist shared verified footage of a residential building in the Al-Amal neighborhood of Khan Younis on fire, stating that Israel had targeted the homes of two journalists. Journalists Mohammed El Salhi, Ibrahim Mohamed Lafi, Mohamed Jarghoun, Ibrahim Qanan, Nidal Al Wahidi, and Haitham Abdelwahid also faced various forms of violence or went missing.

In Gaza, Mohammed Balousha, a journalist who broke the story of premature babies dead at the Nasr pediatric hospital, was shot and injured by the IDF. Hossam Shabat stated the IDF had threatened to bomb his house unless he left Beit Hanoun, which they did after he refused to leave. On 29 December, two Al Jazeera reporters in the West Bank were attacked and beaten by Israeli soldiers. The Canadian government announced in January 2024 that Canadian citizen journalist and aid worker Mansour Shouman was reported missing and feared detained or killed while evacuating from Khan Younis to Rafah. (Note: After two weeks missing, Shouman was discovered alive.) A journalist had his leg amputated after being shot by an Israeli sniper drone in February 2024. Footage by Shehab News Agency showed journalists being targeted by Israeli gunfire in Gaza City on 20 February. On 27 February, Al Jazeera journalist Tareq Abu Azzoum was nearly hit by an Israeli drone attack, stating, "We don't know the reason for this attack, if it was done to prevent us from reporting on the war… It is absolute chaos." Ismail al-Ghoul, a journalist at Al-Shifa Hospital during Israel's March 2024 raid, stated journalists were stripped naked, forced to lie on their stomachs, blindfolded, and interrogated after twelve hours.

In Israel, a right-wing mob stormed the home of Israeli journalist Israel Frey and forced him into hiding after he dedicated a prayer to the victims of the war in Gaza, threatening his family. In June 2024, journalists were attacked by far-right Israelis during the Jerusalem Day march. In October 2024, Al Jazeera cameraman Ali al-Attar was in critical condition after an Israeli attack in the Gaza Strip.

A tent housing media personnel and journalists outside Nasser Hospital in Khan Yunis, a journalist Hilmi al-Faqaawi was burned alive, and several others sustained injuries in an attack on 7 April 2025. On 13 May, Israeli strikes on Nasser Medical Complex killed photojournalist Hassan Islayeh, who was being treated for his injuries sustained during the 7 April strike.

In July 2025, Agence France-Presse issued a statement that its journalists in Gaza were in imminent danger of starving to death, with one already physically unable to work.

== International response and investigation ==
The Committee to Protect Journalists (CPJ) said that Israel is "engaging in the deadliest and most deliberate effort to kill and silence journalists that CPJ has ever documented". Luciano Zaccara, a professor at Qatar University, stated "I don't think there is another situation like this in any other conflict zone". The Jordanian Ministry of Foreign Affairs called on the international community to end Israeli abuses against journalists. Jeremy Scahill stated Israel was "systematically killing the Palestinian journalists". Hadja Lahbib, the Belgian foreign minister, stated journalists in Gaza needed to be protected. Hassan Barari, an international studies professor at Qatar University, stated, "They are targeting Al Jazeera correspondents simply because they want to silence them". U.S. House Representative Ilhan Omar criticized the Biden administration for failing to address Israel's killing of Palestinian journalists in the Gaza Strip.

Commenting on a statement by a senior IDF spokesperson that there was "no difference" between working for the Al-Aqsa media network and belonging to Hamas's armed wing, Adil Haque, a law professor at Rutgers University, described the notion put forward by the spokesperson as "a complete misunderstanding or just a wilful disregard for international law ... If a journalist is not part of Hamas's military wing, if they are not a fighter by role or function, then they're a civilian unless and for such time as they take a direct part in hostilities." Haque added, "It is shocking to hear that a member of the IDF would openly and publicly reveal either their ignorance or their disregard for this fundamental principle." The IDF subsequently issued a statement distancing itself from the spokesperson's comments.

Following an Israeli drone strike in February 2024 that severely wounded several Al Jazeera correspondents, the U.S. Secretary of State spokesman stated, "We continue to engage with the government of Israel to make clear that journalists ought to be protected." The editorial board of the Financial Times wrote of Palestinian journalists in Gaza: "The role of the brave journalists informing the world of what is unfolding becomes ever more important. Yet they are also enduring incredible suffering and appalling losses." On 29 February 2024, more than 30 news organizations, including the Associated Press, Agence France-Presse, and Reuters signed an open letter in solidarity with the journalists of Gaza.

The secretary general of the United Nations Antonio Guterres stated, "I am deeply troubled by the number of journalists that have been killed in this conflict." Guterres's spokesperson Stephane Dujarric stated that "journalists in Gaza have been killed at a level unseen by any conflict in modern times." In August 2024, OHCHR condemned the killing of Al Jazeera journalists Ismail Al-Ghoul and Rami Al-Rifi, stating, "Palestinian journalists play a critical role in informing the world of the reality in Gaza, where Israel has not allowed international journalists to enter. Silencing Palestinian journalists conceals the shocking reality in Gaza."

In response to the killing of six journalists by the Israeli military in Gaza in August 2025, Irene Khan, United Nations Special Rapporteur on the promotion and protection of the right to freedom of opinion and expression, and Francesca Albanese, United Nations Special Rapporteur on the occupied Palestinian territories, demanded independent criminal investigations into the killings and attacks on journalists and said, "Israel continues to deny access to any international media and on the other, it kills with impunity local journalists who are the world’s only professional lens into the agony of genocide and famine unfolding in Gaza".

=== Palestine ===
Abu Omar, an Al Jazeera journalist severely wounded by an Israeli drone strike in Rafah, stated in February 2024, "We will continue the coverage. And we will continue to document Israel's crimes and to show our people's suffering and worries in the Gaza Strip." Wael Al-Dahdouh, who lost multiple members of his family and was himself wounded by an Israeli military attack, stated, "Journalists are facing a massacre, a bloodbath in Gaza" and called "for this massacre to stop." Motaz Azaiza stated, "Israel won't allow international journalists into Gaza and is killing those reporting from within. It is a deliberate attempt to obscure the Palestinian narrative and erase the truth."

Tareq Abu Azzoum, an Al Jazeera English correspondent in Gaza stated, "Palestinian journalists are heroes. Sometimes they have lost their family members and in the same hour they return back to stand in front of the camera only for one purpose: to keep the world informed." Speaking to CNN, Abu Azzoum stated journalists "are not supposed to be attacked".

Shuruq As’ad, a member of the Palestinian Journalists' Syndicate, responding to a question about the conditions for journalists in Palestine during the war described them as "a genocide of journalists, a massacre", "more brutal" and "more aggressive" than they had experienced in their career.

=== Israel ===
Following an article published by HonestReporting on 9 November, Israeli officials suggested that several freelance Palestinian photographers who had documented the 7 October attack in real time must have known of it in advance. Outlets that obtained the photos, including AP, Reuters, CNN and the New York Times, denied embedding their reporters with the attackers or having any prior knowledge of the attack. One of the freelance photographers, who had previously published a photo of himself being kissed on the cheek by Hamas leader Yahya Sinwar, was subsequently dismissed by CNN and AP. Nevertheless, MK Danny Danon suggested that journalists who "took part in recording the assault" would be "eliminated." Gil Hoffman, executive director of HonestReporting, admitted the group had no evidence to back up its claims, and that they were satisfied with journalists' explanations that they did not know about the attacks beforehand.

Al Jazeera stated in February 2024, "The dangers faced by Gaza's visual journalists has been amplified by Israeli efforts to legitimise targeting them".

In August 2025, Israel's +972 Magazine reported that the Israeli army created a special unit known as the "Legitimization Cell" to link Palestinian journalists to Hamas in order to justify their killings.

=== International press bodies ===
The Committee to Protect Journalists (CPJ) is actively looking into all cases of journalists affected—whether killed, injured, detained, or missing—due to the conflict. CPJ stated this was the deadliest conflict for journalists in the past 30 years. They have urged Israel to conduct a thorough investigation into the death of Palestinian journalist Mohammad El-Salhi, make the results of the investigation public, and promptly take measures to guarantee the safety of media personnel covering the conflict. The CPJ president stated the killing of journalists in Gaza "appear to have been targeted." A 2026 Committee to Protect Journalists report stated that 2025 was the deadliest year for journalists since it began collecting data and that Israel was responsible for two-thirds of all press killings in both 2025 and 2024.

Reporters Without Borders asked the International Criminal Court in November 2023 to begin a priority war crimes investigation into the killing of nine journalists. RSF noted 41 journalists had been killed during the first month of the conflict, stating multiple journalists had been killed by Israel in their homes. Israel maintains records of the place and residence of every person in Gaza. RSF claimed Israel had used targeted strikes to kill journalists in Gaza.

The Arab and Middle Eastern Journalists Association has condemned the spate of deaths and restated that: "Targeting journalists is a stark violation of press freedom and international human rights law". The Committee to Protect Journalists stated, "More journalists were killed in the first three months of the Israel-Gaza war than have ever been killed in a single country over an entire year". In August 2024, Israeli forces reportedly shot journalist Salma al-Qadoumi in the back while she was reporting in Khan Younis.

The director of Democracy for the Arab World Now stated international journalists were portrayed by the Israeli government as being biased toward Palestinians, and as a result, soldiers saw journalists as "representative of their enemy" and were thus not punished for killing the media. The International Federation of Journalists stated, "I think this is now a press freedom issue. I think we have to ask ourselves, 'What is the [Israeli military] trying to achieve? Why won't they let foreign journalists in?'" The CJP stated the conflict was the most dangerous situation for journalists it had ever seen. The CPJ's Middle East director stated, "Israel's longstanding record of impunity in journalist killings must face public scrutiny".

Reporters Without Borders filed a complaint with the International Criminal Court in December 2023 over the killing of seven more Palestinian journalists, including Samer Abu Daqqa. On 7 January 2024, the CPJ stated the deaths of Hamza Dahdouh and Mustafa Thuraya needed to be investigated and those who killed them held accountable.

Human Rights Watch, Freedom House, the Knight First Amendment Institute at Columbia University, the Committee to Protect Journalists, and Reporters Without Borders signed a joint letter on 10 January 2024 to U.S. president Joe Biden, calling on his administration to do more to prevent airstrikes on journalists. On 25 January, the International Press Institute stated the number of journalists killed in Gaza represented "the worst killing we have noted in a conflict zone since our organisation was founded 75 years ago". Reporters Without Borders stated on 8 February, "Palestinian journalism has been decimated by Israeli armed forces with complete impunity".

A group of 36 newspapers, including Reuters, AP, AFP, The New York Times, The Guardian, Der Spiegel, Inquirer, Haaretz, Al-Araby Al-Jadeed, The Asahi Shimbun signed an "Open letter on journalists in Gaza" on 29 February 2024, coordinated by the Committee to Protect Journalists against the ongoing killings, calling for all parties to protect journalists and the right to report. In July 2024, the National Union of Journalists condemned "the murders of at least 117 Palestinian journalists in Gaza since the outbreak of war." In October 2024, the Al Jazeera Media Network condemned Israel's "continued" targeting of its journalists in the Gaza Strip, following the shooting of their cameraman Fadi Al Wahidi in the neck.

PEN International wrote in November 2024 that it was outraged by an Israeli accusation against six journalists in the Gaza Strip, calling them threats against the journalists. The International Federation of Journalists condemned "Israel’s strategy of slandering Gaza’s journalists with unproven allegations" and called for an investigation into "Israel’s systematic targeting and killing of journalists".

In June 2026, the CPJ made public that it removed 20 names from its list of journalists and media workers killed during the Israel–Gaza war, including eight individuals that it determined were members of Hamas or Palestinian Islamic Jihad. A further nineteen were removed in September 2026. According to Palestinian activist and writer Mohammed el-Kurd, he stated on X that CPJ announced plans to change the organisation's definition of what qualifies as a "journalist" and excluding Palestinian and Lebanese journalists who worked for state-funded media outlets. The Lemkin Institute for Genocide Prevention condemned the decision on X and called it as "a terrible act of complicity in genocide". The Foreign Ministry of Israel praised the decision and equated journalists in Gaza to "Hamas and Palestinian Islamic Jihad terrorists". Jodie Ginsberg, the president of CPJ, defended the decision, saying that its methodology was guided by international humanitarian law.

In July 2026, the Washington Free Beacon reported that the IFJ also removed eight names from its list of journalists killed in Gaza. At the same time, IFJ added 14 additional names, raising their count of slain Palestinian journalists in Gaza from 235 to 241.

=== Academic analysis ===
According to a report by the Watson Institute for International and Public Affairs, the war in Gaza has led to the deaths of more journalists than the combined total killed during the U.S. Civil War, World War I, World War II, the Korean War, the Vietnam War (including related conflicts in Cambodia and Laos), the Yugoslav Wars of the 1990s and early 2000s, and the post-9/11 war in Afghanistan.

However, the fact-checking initiative of the European Journalism Training Association assessed this claim as "mostly false" because the report cites the Freedom Forum, which states that its "database was not designed to function as a comprehensive historical record" and "should not be used as a complete basis for quantitative comparisons."

=== Protests and rallies ===
Numerous Pakistani journalists gathered for a rally in Karachi to condemn what they viewed as intentional attacks on the media in Gaza. They called upon the United Nations to take action to halt Israeli aggression against media outlets. During the rally, they prominently displayed banners and placards featuring images of journalists who had been killed in Israeli airstrikes. Journalists in more than 100 countries, and press bodies such as the International Federation of Journalists, marked 26 February 2024 as the International Day for Palestinian Journalists. In August 2024, the Melbourne Symphony Orchestra cancelled Jayson Gillham's performance after he dedicated a piece to the journalists killed in Gaza.

== See also ==
- Casualties of the Gaza war
- Media coverage of the Gaza war
- Israeli war crimes in the Gaza war
- Executions and assassinations during the Gaza war
- Maguindanao massacre, described by the Committee to Protect Journalists as the deadliest event for journalists in its history
- Attacks on journalists during the Israel–Hezbollah conflict (2023–present)
