= Anas Al-Sharif =

Palestinian journalist (1996–2025)

- أنس الشريف
- Al-Sharif reporting during the Gaza war in a frame published by Al Jazeera when they reported on his death
- Born: Anas Jamal Mahmoud Al-Sharif; 3 December 1996; Jabalia refugee camp, Gaza Strip, Palestine
- Died: 10 August 2025 (aged 28); Gaza City, Gaza Strip, Palestine
- Cause of death: Targeted Israeli airstrike
- Occupations: Journalist; correspondent; videographer
- Employer: Al Jazeera Arabic
- Known for: Reporting from northern Gaza during the Gaza war; killed while working
- Children: 2
- Awards: Pulitzer Prize for Breaking News Photography

Anas Jamal Mahmoud Al-Sharif (Arabic: أنس جمال محمود الشريف; 3 December 1996 – 10 August 2025) was a Palestinian journalist and videographer for Al Jazeera Arabic, known for his frontline reporting from northern Gaza during the Gaza war. In 2024, Al-Sharif's Reuters team was awarded a Pulitzer Prize for Breaking News Photography for their "raw and urgent" photos documenting the Gaza war.

Al-Sharif was killed along with four journalists and two others in an Israeli airstrike targeting him and other journalists in a tent outside the Al-Shifa Hospital in Gaza City on 10 August 2025. At the time of his death, 234 journalists had been killed during the Gaza war. Prior to his killing, the Israel Defense Forces (IDF) accused Al-Sharif of being a Hamas operative. Human rights organizations and Al Jazeera said this was an excuse to justify the killing of journalists and the Committee to Protect Journalists (CPJ) had called on the international community to protect him.

According to his brother, Israel offered Al-Sharif safe passage out of Gaza four days before he was killed if he stopped reporting, but he refused.

== Early life and family ==
Al-Sharif was born in the Jabalia refugee camp in 1996, to a family displaced in 1948 from Al-Majdal (today the Israeli city of Ashkelon). As a child, Al-Sharif was interviewed in an Al-Jazeera broadcast during the 2008 Gaza war and stated that he wanted to be a journalist. He graduated from Al-Aqsa University with a bachelor's degree in mass communication, specializing in radio and television.

Before the Gaza war, Al-Sharif worked as a freelance photographer for multiple outlets, including the Al-Shamal Media Network. While reporting on the 2018–2019 Gaza border protests near Jabalia, Al-Sharif sustained a shrapnel injury to his abdomen. While CNN and the BBC reported that he had allegedly worked with a Hamas media team, he later criticized the organization's negotiating team in 2025. According to a Novara Media report published in August 2025, the BBC ignored a correction request which sought to clarify that, while a source had claimed he worked with Hamas, Al Jazeera denied this, and the BBC's own correspondent saw no evidence to support the claim. Despite the correction request, the original statement remained unchanged.

Al-Sharif was married and had two young children.

== Gaza war ==
Al-Sharif became one of the most visible faces reporting on the Gaza war, refusing to evacuate the north despite repeated Israeli orders and direct threats to his life. He continued daily coverage through airstrikes, massacres, and displacement, often working under extreme danger and chronic shortages of basic supplies. His reporting provided footage and testimony from one of the most inaccessible war zones globally.

=== 2023 ===
At the beginning of the Gaza war, Al-Sharif was working as a photographer when Tamer Almisshal recruited him as a TV reporter for Al Jazeera Arabic. He appeared on the air almost daily for the entirety of his time at Al Jazeera. In November 2023, the Israeli military called him and told him to stop reporting and leave northern Gaza. Additionally they sent him messages indicating that they knew his location. A few weeks later, his family home in Jabalia was targeted in an Israeli airstrike, killing his father. Due to poor health, his father had been unable to evacuate their home with the rest of their family. He was buried on the grounds of a school being used to shelter displaced people. At the time, Al-Sharif was the fourth Al-Jazeera journalist to have relatives killed by the IDF during the Gaza war. The CPJ said it was alarmed by the IDF's attacks on journalists' families.

=== 2024 ===
In early 2024, Al-Sharif reported on the lack of food in northern Gaza. In one video, he described children trying to salvage animal feed for bread. In May, Al-Sharif's Reuters team was awarded a Pulitzer Prize for Breaking News Photography for their "raw and urgent" photos documenting the Gaza war.

Ismail Al-Ghoul, his Al Jazeera colleague and close friend, was killed by the IDF in July. Al-Sharif reported from the hospital where Al-Ghoul's body was brought. He made a speech holding Al-Ghoul's damaged press vest, condemning Al-Ghoul's killing and pledging to continue reporting. He later told The Nation that reporting on Al-Ghoul's death was one of his hardest experiences as a journalist.

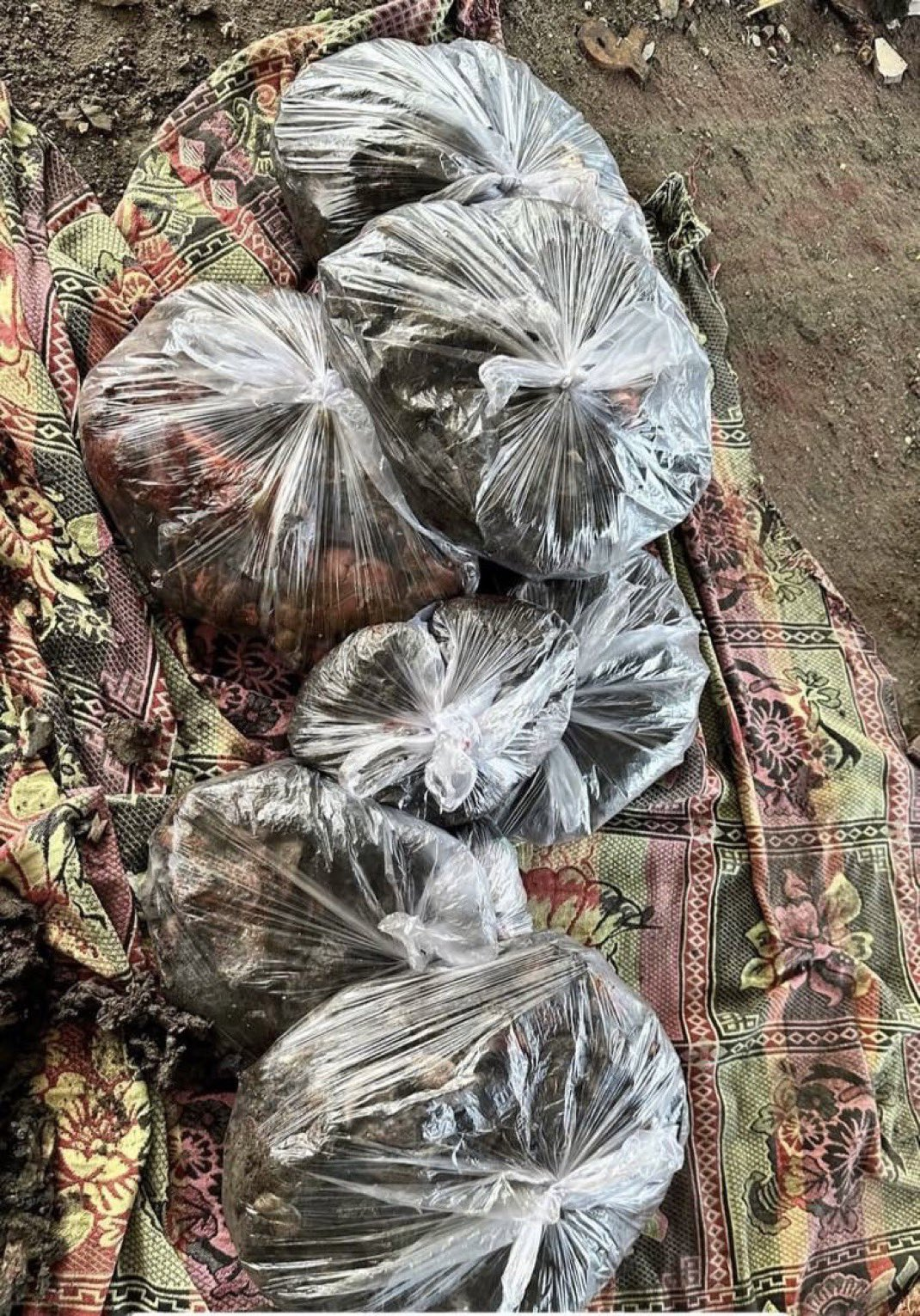
Bags of charred, dismembered bodies of victims of Al-Tabieen school massacre

A week later, Al-Sharif reported on the aftermath of the Israeli airstrike on the Al-Tabaeen School, which was sheltering thousands of displaced people. He stated that almost 100 Palestinians had been massacred at dawn and called the scene indescribable. Tamer Almisshal tweeted a message of support for Al-Sharif. IDF spokesman Avichay Adraee responded, accusing Al-Sharif of lying to conceal the presence of Palestinian militants at the school. Al-Jazeera denounced the accusations as intimidation and slander of Al-Sharif's character, and the Committee to Protect Journalists (CPJ) released a statement of concern for Al-Sharif's safety. Al-Sharif later described the aftermath of the attack: "Pieces of children, women, the elderly, and young men lay intertwined on the ground, side-by-side, as they had been when they gathered for dawn prayers. This massacre left a deep wound in my soul, one that time can never heal."

In early October, the IDF fired on a group of journalists, including Al-Sharif and Hossam Shabat, while they were filming a report in Jabalia about the siege of North Gaza. Cameraman Fadi Al-Wahidi was shot in the neck, paralyzing him. Unable to find an ambulance or take him to the nearby Al-Awda hospital because it was besieged by the IDF, the journalists drove him to another hospital while he bled. Al-Sharif tweeted a photo of Al-Wahidi on the ground after the shooting, noting that he was wearing his press vest. As Al-Wahidi's condition worsened, Al-Sharif called for his evacuation out of Gaza. Later that month, the IDF released a list of six Al-Jazeera journalists, including Al-Sharif and Shabat, and accused them of being Palestinian militants. Al-Jazeera condemned the allegations as false. The CPJ accused Israel of making unsubstantiated claims against Al-Sharif, as it did after killing Ismail Al-Ghoul. Reporters Without Borders (RSF) warned that Israel was trying to "systematically eliminate journalists" in Gaza.

After Al-Sharif's Instagram account was suspended in November, he created a new one and accused Meta of censoring Palestinian content. In December, Amnesty International Australia recognized Al-Sharif with a Human Rights Defender award for continuing to report despite Israeli attacks on journalists. He dedicated his award to journalists in Gaza. Later that month, Al-Sharif reported on an Israeli airstrike which targeted a clearly marked press van near Al-Awda Hospital, killing five journalists from Al-Quds Today. He stated that one of the journalists was waiting for his wife to give birth to their first child at the hospital.

=== 2025 ===
A ceasefire was declared in January 2025, and a video of Al-Sharif's broadcast went viral on social media. In it, Al-Sharif announces the ceasefire and removes his protective gear, stating: "I am taking off the helmet that tired me, and this armor that has become an extension of my body". Cheering bystanders raise him on their shoulders in celebration.

In March, Israel broke the ceasefire. A week later, the IDF killed Hossam Shabat in a targeted airstrike on his vehicle. Al-Sharif participated in Shabat's funeral procession. On social media, he mourned Shabat's death and posted that Israel had "sanctioned the killing of all of us". Five months before killing Shabat, Israel had accused him and five other Al-Jazeera journalists of being militants, including Al-Sharif. Al-Sharif told Drop Site News that Shabat had wanted him to continue reporting and that he would do so until his death despite the IDF's threats.

As the starvation in Gaza intensified in July, Al-Sharif posted online that he was "drowning in hunger". In a broadcast on 20 July, Al-Sharif was visibly distraught, calling the starvation a "slow death", as an apparently malnourished woman fainted behind him. A bystander told him: "Keep going Anas, you are our voice". Video of the broadcast went viral on social media. The IDF dismissed the video as contrived, and according to the CPJ, escalated their smear campaign against Al-Sharif. Shortly before his death, Al-Sharif posted on social media about the IDF's bombing of Gaza City.

In December 2025, Zeteo named him the "Journalist of the Year".

=== Gaza photos by Al-Sharif and Saleh Najm (October 2023) ===
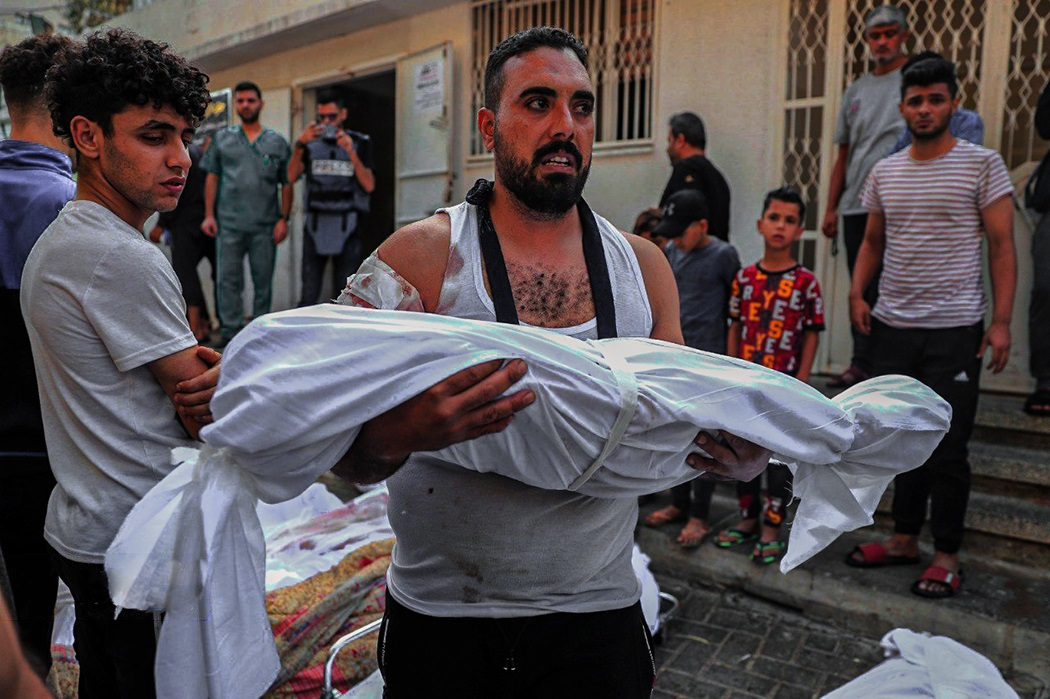

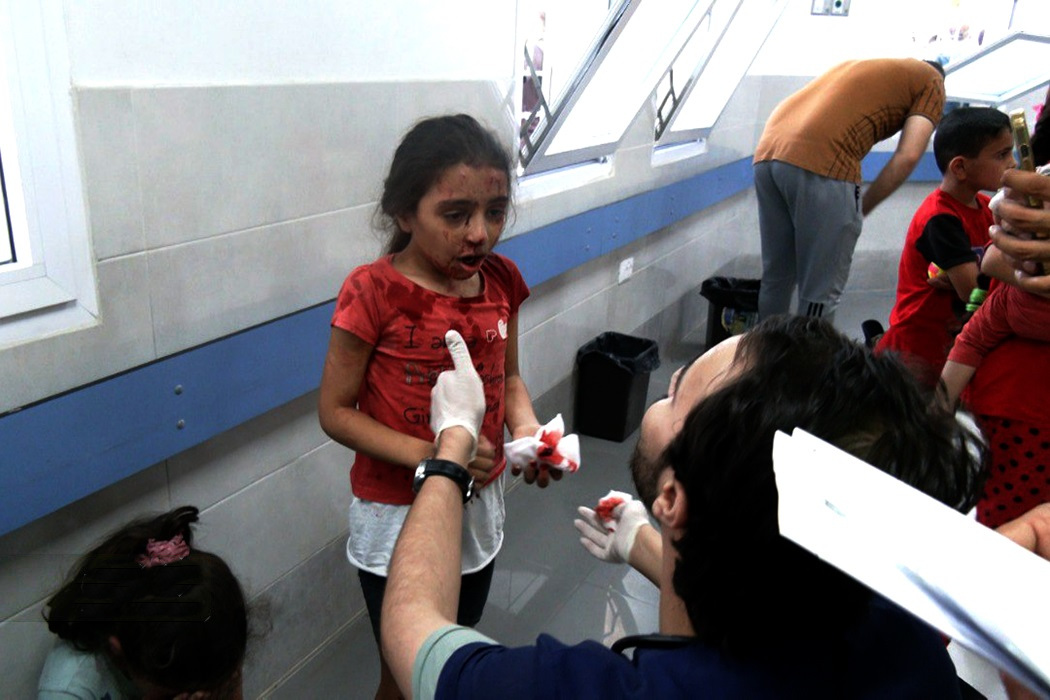

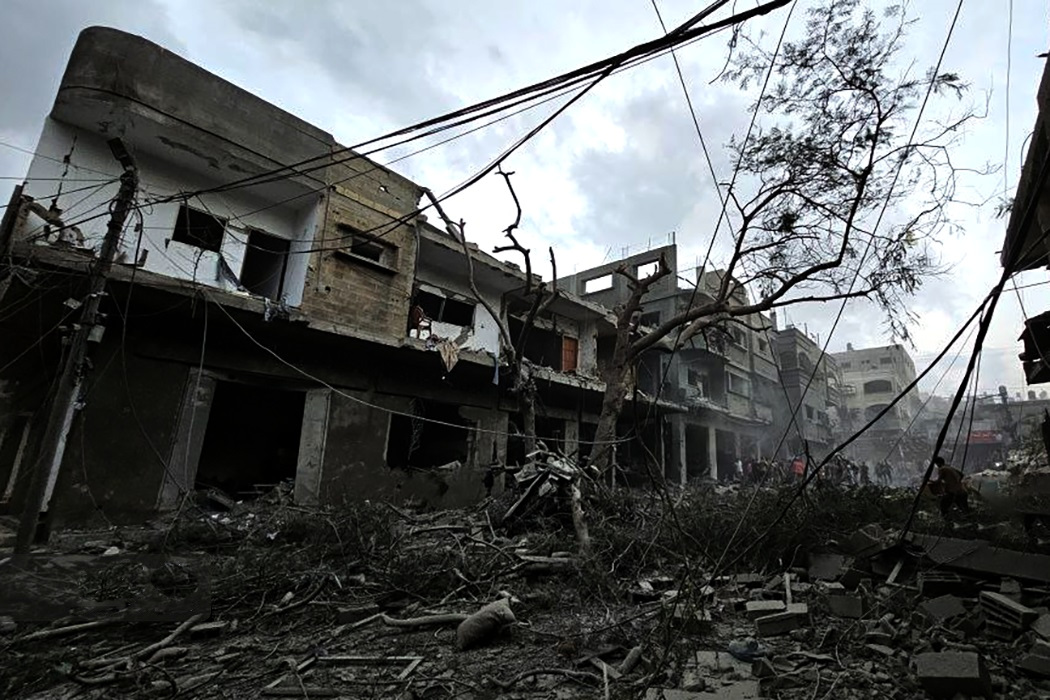

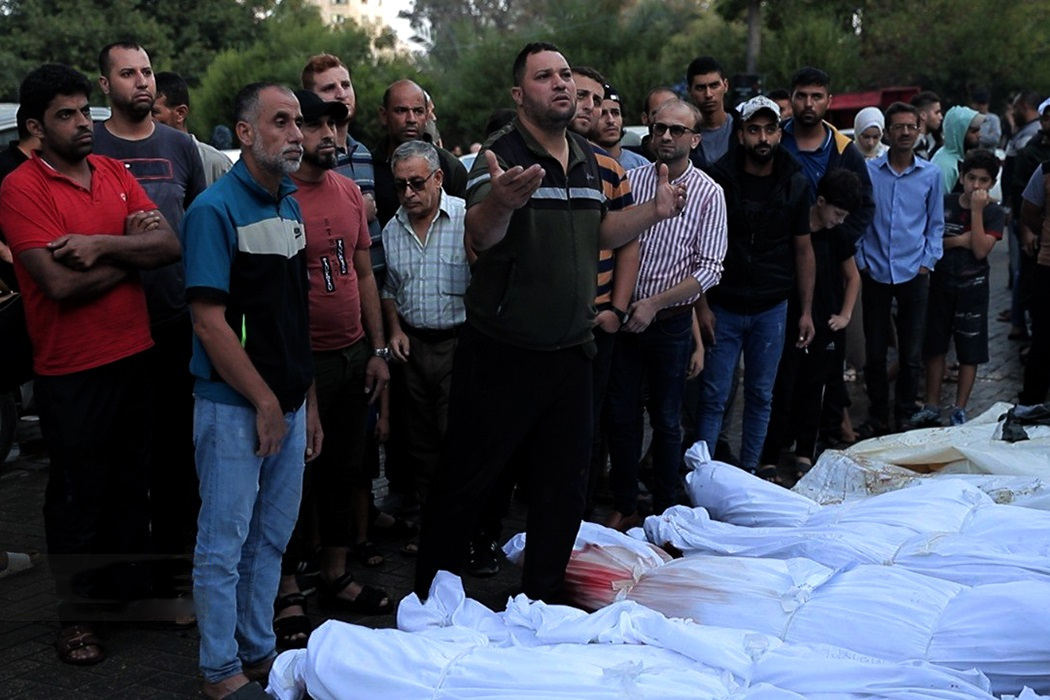

== Assassination ==
From 2023, Al-Sharif faced mounting threats from the IDF, including phone calls, voice messages, and social media campaigns, which claimed that he was a Hamas operative. The IDF's Arabic spokesperson, Avichay Adraee, accused Al-Sharif and other journalists of terrorism, with the IDF alleging that Al-Sharif was a Hamas operative in charge of rocket launching. Various human rights organizations and Al Jazeera described the claims as baseless attacks aimed at justifying the killing of journalists and suppression of unfavorable reporting towards Israel. The Committee to Protect Journalists (CPJ) called the attacks against Al-Sharif a "precursor to assassination" and urged international action to protect him and other journalists in Gaza, highlighting the deliberate risk faced by local reporters as the "last eyes and ears of the outside world" on the conflict. In July 2025, Al-Sharif told the CPJ that he lived with the "feeling that I could be bombed and martyred at any moment". Al-Jazeera instructed Al-Sharif to stay near Al-Shifa Hospital and tried to keep him on air, in hopes that it would deter the IDF from killing him.

According to +972 Magazine, a special unit in the Israeli military called the "Legitimization Cell" works to identify journalists in Gaza that it can depict as undercover Hamas operatives to render them legitimate targets to kill, in an attempt to stifle media coverage of its activities in Gaza and quell international outrage over Israel's killing of journalists.

On 31 July 2025, UN Special Rapporteur Irene Khan condemned repeated threats and smear campaigns by the Israeli army against Al-Sharif, calling them dangerous attempts to silence his reporting on the war in Gaza. She highlighted how Al-Sharif, described as "the last surviving journalist of Al Jazeera in northern Gaza", had been accused without evidence of being a "Hamas terrorist", placing his life at serious risk. Khan stressed that, while Israel bars international reporters from entering Gaza, it simultaneously targets and undermines local journalists, who serve as the world's "eyes" on atrocities.

At approximately 11:30 PM on 10 August 2025, Al-Sharif was killed in an Israeli airstrike on a media tent outside Al-Shifa Hospital in Gaza City. His colleagues Mohammed Qreiqeh, Ibrahim Zaher, Mohammed Noufal, and Moamen Aliwa along with two others were also killed in the bombing. A witness stated that the journalists died instantly. Footage from the aftermath shows a journalist running toward a burning tent shouting that Al-Sharif was killed. Another video shows the retrieval of the bodies.

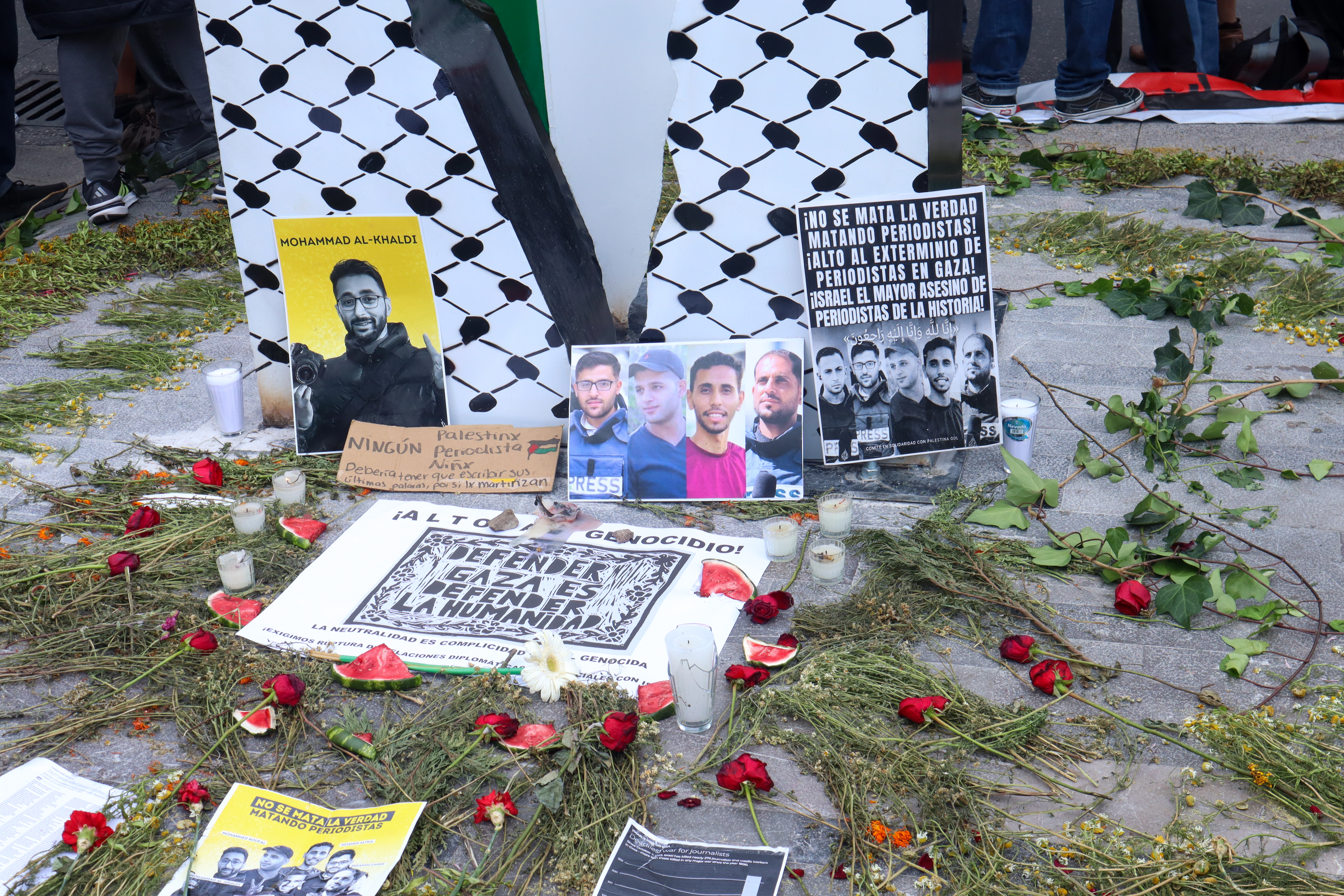
Photos of Palestinian journalists killed on 10 August 2025

The Israeli military confirmed they had targeted Al-Sharif, reiterating their claim that he was a Hamas fighter. According to BBC News, The Guardian, and The Economist, the Israeli military has not provided sufficient evidence for their accusation. The Guardian also questioned how Al-Sharif could "have juggled a military command role with regular broadcast duties in one of the most heavily surveilled places on Earth".

In a message posthumously posted to his Twitter account, Al-Sharif wrote: "If these words reach you, know that Israel has succeeded in killing me and silencing my voice". He also stated: "Do not forget Gaza... And do not forget me in your sincere prayers". The funeral for Al-Sharif and the other three Al-Jazeera journalists was held on 11 August and attended by hundreds of people. Al-Sharif was buried in Sheikh Radwan Cemetery in Gaza City. At the time of his death, Israel had killed at least 234 journalists during the Gaza war, including 10 Al-Jazeera journalists.

=== Reactions ===
==== Palestine ====
Hamas said it was "a barbaric crime that surpasses all limits of fascism and criminality". Adding in a statement: "The martyr Anas al-Sharif was a model of the free journalist, documenting the crime of starvation and showing the world the scenes of famine imposed by the occupation on our people in Gaza". Hamas suggested it signaled an impending Israeli invasion of Gaza City. Palestinian Islamic Jihad condemned Al-Sharif's assassination as a "heinous war crime committed by the usurping entity in full view of the entire world", and warned that Israel is paving the way for the next phase of its assault by "targeting journalists who expose its crimes and massacres to the world". The Popular Front for the Liberation of Palestine stated that the killing of the journalists serves as "a dangerous indicator of the occupation's intent to commit the most heinous atrocities in Gaza".

==== Media and press freedom organizations ====
Al Jazeera Media Network condemned the strike as a "premeditated assassination" and "yet another blatant and premeditated attack on press freedom", noting that Al-Sharif and his colleagues were among the few journalists still reporting from Gaza. The Qatari network accused Israel of attempting to suppress coverage of its military actions. Al Jazeera managing editor Mohamed Mawad said that Al-Sharif's killing followed a pattern of "degrading, delegitimizing, smearing, and then killing" other Palestinian journalists. The Palestinian Journalists' Syndicate described it as a "bloody crime".

Press freedom organizations, including the CPJ, RSF, and the International Federation of Journalists reiterated that journalists are civilians under international law and must not be targeted. Sara Qudah of the CPJ stated "Israel's pattern of labeling journalists as militants without providing credible evidence raises serious questions about its intent and respect for press freedom. The National Press Club president Mike Balsamo stated that "Journalists must be able to work without being targeted or killed", and that all parties have to abide by international law. PEN America stated that the assassination may be a war crime and decried "the fact that al-Sharif's family, friends, and colleagues must now defend him from unsupported accusations rather than being able to mourn him and honour his legacy as a journalist".

Articles condemning Al-Sharif's assassination have been written by The Guardian editorial board, the Mail & Guardian editorial board, Lydia Polgreen, Gideon Levy, Nesrine Malik, Mohamad Bazzi, Steven Thrasher, and others.

==== Political and diplomatic responses ====
A spokesperson for Prime Minister of the United Kingdom Keir Starmer said that the government was "gravely concerned by the repeated targeting of journalists in Gaza". The United Nations' human rights office described the attack as violating international law. Indian MP Priyanka Gandhi called the assassination "yet another heinous crime committed on Palestinian soil" and praised the courage of the deceased journalists. Italian Defense Minister Guido Crosetto stated that Israel had "lost its reason and humanity".

==== Hind Rajab Foundation ====
On 12 August 2025, the Hind Rajab Foundation, in collaboration with the Palestinian Centre for Human Rights, filed a complaint to the International Criminal Court in the Hague against a group of IDF soldiers thought to be connected to the airstrike. The complaint accuses them of war crimes and genocide "as part of the broader campaign to destroy the Palestinian people and erase those documenting their suffering".

==== Protests ====
There have been protests and vigils in multiple cities across the world against Al-Sharif's assassination, including Ramallah, Dublin, Oslo, Berlin, Karachi, Cape Town, and Mexico City. In Amsterdam, a vigil was held with five mock coffins representing Al-Sharif and his murdered colleagues. A vigil in front of Al-Jazeera's offices in Johannesburg featured signs that said "Journalism is not a crime", while protesters in Washington, DC, stated that media coverage of the Gaza war is contributing to the killing of journalists. In London, a vigil was held outside BBC headquarters with a banner stating: "You killed Anas".

== See also ==
- List of journalists killed during the Israeli–Palestinian conflict
- List of journalists killed in the Gaza war
- List of Israeli assassinations
- Journalist Mariam Dagga
