= Killing of Ismail al-Ghoul =

2024 targeted killing of a Palestinian journalist

- Part of The Gaza war
- Location: 31°31′55.9″N 34°26′43.4″E; Al-Shati refugee camp, Gaza Strip, Palestine
- Date: July 31, 2024; 2 years ago c. 4:00 pm (EEST UTC+3)
- Attack type: Airstrike
- Victims: Ismail Al-Ghoul; Rami al-Rifi; Khalid Shawa
- Perpetrator: Israel Defense Forces

On 31 July 2024, Ismail al-Ghoul, a Palestinian journalist and correspondent for Al Jazeera covering the Gaza war, was killed along with cameraman Rami al-Rifi in an Israeli airstrike on the al-Shati refugee camp while reporting on the assassination of Ismail Haniyeh.

The incident drew international condemnation and calls for an independent investigation, with organizations such as Reporters Without Borders and the Committee to Protect Journalists denouncing the killing as a possible war crime, while the Israel Defense Forces claimed al-Ghoul was a Hamas operative, a charge Al Jazeera rejected as baseless.

== Background ==
Ismail al-Ghoul
- إسماعيل الغول
- Born: 14 January 1997; Israeli-occupied Gaza Strip
- Died: 31 July 2024 (aged 27); Al-Shati refugee camp, Gaza Strip
- Cause of death: Targeted killing by Israel air strike
- Citizenship: Palestine
- Education: Islamic University of Gaza
- Occupations: Journalist, correspondent
- Years active: 2023–2024
- Employer: Al Jazeera Arabic

Ismail al-Ghoul (Arabic: إسماعيل الغول; 14 January 1997 – 31 July 2024) was a Palestinian journalist and an Al Jazeera Arabic correspondent in the Gaza Strip.

On 31 July 2024, during the Gaza war, al-Ghoul and Al Jazeera cameraman Rami al-Rifi were killed by an Israel Defense Forces airstrike while covering the assassination of Hamas leader Ismail Haniyeh near his family home in the northern-Gaza Strip.

=== Career ===
Al-Ghoul obtained a bachelor's degree in journalism from the Islamic University of Gaza and began his work in the field of written journalism as a correspondent for local letters and Palestinian newspapers.

He later shifted to television, working with several media companies in Gaza.

=== Al-Shifa Hospital siege ===
On 18 March 2024, Ismail al-Ghoul, along with many other civilians, was arrested by the Israeli Defense Forces, during the al-Shifa hospital siege. Al-Ghoul was severely beaten by Israeli soldiers and detained for 12 hours before being released.

In an interview with Al Jazeera, al-Ghoul claimed that Israeli forces attacked the hospital and targeted journalists, breaking their equipment and arresting them. Al-Ghoul said that the journalists were stripped, blindfolded, and forced to lie on their stomachs with their hands tied. If they moved, the soldiers would shoot at the ground in order to intimidate them. After about 12 hours, the journalists were taken for questioning.

The Committee to Protect Journalists and Reporters Without Borders condemned the assault. They confirmed that al-Ghoul was beaten, and his equipment was destroyed. They also called for an end to such actions.

== Death by Israeli airstrike ==
On 31 July 2024, Ismail al-Ghoul and cameraman Rami al-Rifi were in Gaza to report near the home of Ismail Haniyeh, the leader of Hamas, who had been assassinated earlier that day in Tehran, Iran.

Around 4 pm (PSDT), both journalists were killed by an Israeli airstrike that targeted the al-Shati refugee camp in Gaza. Al-Jazeera journalist Anas Al-Sharif reported that his colleagues were decapitated by the strike.

Al Jazeera's correspondent, Anas al-Sharif, reported on the aftermath from the hospital where the bodies of his colleagues were taken. He said: "al-Ghoul was sharing the suffering of the displaced Palestinians and the suffering of the wounded, and the massacres committed by the Israelis against the innocent people in Gaza".

At the time of the attack, al-Ghoul and al-Rifi were wearing media vests, and their car had clear signs identifying them as journalists. They had contacted their news desk just 15 minutes before the strike. During the call, they reported a strike on a nearby house and were told to leave the area immediately. They were on their way to the al-Ahli Arab Hospital when they were killed.

On 1 August 2024 the Israeli military posted a tweet on their official Twitter account bragging about killing al-Ghoul and claiming, without proof, that al-Ghoul was a Nukhba operative who participated in the October 7 attack.

Al Jazeera refuted these claims, bringing up the fact that al-Ghoul was arrested and released by the Israeli military in March during an Israeli raid on al-Shifa Hospital which: "debunks and refutes their false claim of his affiliation with any organization". An Israeli military spokesperson said they did not have anything more to say on the topic.

== Israeli claims of Hamas affiliation ==
According to +972 Magazine, a special unit in the Israeli military called the "Legitimization Cell" works to identify journalists in Gaza that it can depict as undercover Hamas operatives to render them legitimate targets to kill, in an attempt to stifle media coverage of its activities in Gaza and quell international outrage over Israel's killing of journalists.

In al-Ghoul's case, the Israeli claimed he was a "military wing operative and Nukhba terrorist" according to a document taken from a "Hamas computer" that said he earned this rank in 2007, when he would have been 10 years old, and several years before he was supposed to have joined Hamas.

== Reactions ==
=== Media ===
- The Qatar Press Center strongly condemned what they described as the "assassination" of journalists Ismail al-Ghoul, Rami al-Rifi.
- Al Jazeera Media Network described the killing as a "deliberate assassination".
  - Al Jazeera English correspondent Maram Humaid wrote a eulogy to al-Ghoul, stating: "Your death is the latest reminder of how Israel has silenced so many of us, too many to name, but each one is forever lodged in our memories as a hero taken away too soon".

=== Organisations ===
- The Committee to Protect Journalists expressed deep concern over the killing of Al Jazeera TV reporter Ismail al-Ghoul and cameraman Rami al-Rifi. The committee's CEO, Jodie Ginsberg, speaking from New York City, emphasized that journalists are civilians and should never be targeted, demanding an explanation from Israel for what appears to be a deliberate strike.
- The Reporters Without Borders has filed three complaints with the International Criminal Court.
- The Freedom of the Press Foundation responded to the Israeli military's tweet asking for evidence and calling the assassination a flimsy excuse to target a journalist by a media house that the Israeli military dislikes.
- Irene Khan, the UN Special Rapporteur on freedom of opinion and expression, stated: "I strongly denounce the deliberate targeting by Israel of two journalists in Gaza, which adds to an already appalling toll of reporters and media workers killed in this war".

== See also ==
- List of journalists killed in the Gaza war
- Israeli war crimes
- Israeli war crimes in the Gaza war
- Gaza genocide
- List of journalists killed during the Israeli–Palestinian conflict
