= Tamer Almisshal =

Palestinian journalist

- تامر المسحال
- Born: March 23, 1983 (age 43); Al-Shati refugee camp
- Education: Islamic University of Gaza; University of Westminster

Tamer Almisshal (Arabic: تامر المسحال, romanized: Tāmir al-Misḥāl; 23 March 1983 –) is a Palestinian journalist who works at Al-Jazeera, and is the host of The Hidden is More Immense.

== Early life and education ==
Almisshal grew up in Gaza City. He completed degrees in media at Islamic University of Gaza in 2004 and University of Westminster in 2007.

== Career ==
Almisshal started as an intern at the BBC in 2001, eventually serving as a Gaza correspondent for BBC Arabic. Since 2008, Almisshal has worked for Al-Jazeera, where he has covered multiple conflicts including the Gaza wars in 2008-2009, 2012, and 2014. In 2015, he spoke at Gaza's first TEDx event.

As of 2020, Almisshal was based in Doha, Qatar. That year, Almisshal was one of 36 Al-Jazeera journalists whose phones were hacked by a group connected to Saudi Arabia and the UAE using Pegasus software. The hack was discovered because Almisshal had received threatening messages and asked researchers from Citizen Lab to monitor his phone.

After his colleague Shireen Abu Akleh's death in May 2022, Almisshal accused the Israel Defense Forces (IDF) of assassinating her based on footage and witness testimony. At the time, Israel denied killing her. He eulogized her as a "model" of journalism.

The Hidden is More Immense aired an investigation into censorship of Palestinian content by Meta in September 2023. His Facebook profile was deleted 24 hours later.

During the Gaza war, he heads a team of Gaza-based journalists, several of whom have been killed by Israel. He has accused Israel of targeting Palestinian journalists in order to suppress their coverage.
