= The Hidden Is More Immense =

Arabic political investigative journalism TV series

- Arabic: ما خفي أعظم
- Genre: Investigative journalism
- Presented by: Tamer Al Misshal
- Country of origin: Qatar
- Original language: Arabic

Production
- Running time: 60 Minutes

Original release
- Network: Al Jazeera
- Release: November 6, 2016 – present

The Hidden Is More Immense (Arabic: ما خفي أعظم, romanized: Mā khafīyā aʻẓam) or The Tip of the Iceberg is an Arabic political investigative journalism TV series focusing mainly on current events in the Middle East, and the Muslim world. The program is produced and aired by Al Jazeera and is presented by Tamer Al Misshal. Some of the episodes have been localised to English and broadcast on the Al Jazeera English channel as part of networkwide documentary strand Al Jazeera World.

== Title translation ==
The name of the TV show in Arabic is (ما خفي أعظم, Ma khafia A'etham), which is an expression that could be translated into English as The Hidden is More Immense, Still Waters Run Deep, or The Tip of the Iceberg.

== Episodes ==
=== 2016 ===
Release date	Arabic title	English title & description	YouTube Official (Al Jazeera English)	YouTube Official (Al Jazeera Arabic)
6 November 2016	سقوط في حرم السفارة	"Fall down on the embassy campus", is the first episode, investigating the unsolved case of the assassination of Omar Al-Nayef, a Palestinian fighter who died in his country's embassy in Sofia in February 2015.		https://www.youtube.com/watch?v=q_fl0IbJhDM
29/12/2016	الجزيرة تكشف خفايا تنظيم الدولة في بروكسل	"ISIL in Brussels", investigates the ISIL cell that responsible for the attacks in Paris and Brussels.	https://www.youtube.com/watch?v=tyEG_EscMdw	https://www.youtube.com/watch?v=exTUY2aCOco

=== 2017 ===
Release date	Arabic title	English title & description	YouTube Official (Al Jazeera English)	YouTube Official (Al Jazeera Arabic)
30 March 2017	محمد الزواري طيار المقاومة	"Mohamed Zouari, pilot of the Resistance", new details and investigations about the assassination of Mohamed Zouari, a Tunisian aeronautical engineer and member of the al-Qassam Brigades which is the military wing of the Palestinian Islamic Resistance Hamas.		https://www.youtube.com/watch?v=zk-v7JXZ4tA

=== 2018 ===
Release date	Arabic title	English title & description	YouTube Official (Al Jazeera English)	YouTube Official (Al Jazeera Arabic)
2019/4/14	من مستورد إلى مصدر.. من ساعد إسرائيل في سرقة غاز غزة؟	The Gaza Gas Deal, "From an importer to an exporter .. Who helped Israel to steal Gaza's gas?", How behind-the-scenes deals prevented Palestinians from exploiting valuable natural gas fields off the coast of Gaza.	https://www.youtube.com/watch?v=8-QLL6fHIGg	https://www.youtube.com/watch?v=MFGk7WMa61k

=== 2020 ===
List of the episodes
Release date	Arabic title	English title & description	YouTube Official (Al Jazeera English)	YouTube Official (Al Jazeera Arabic)
12/7/2020	تفاصيل هروب شيتي من الإمارات واسم شريكه الخفي	"BR Shetty and the Missing Millions" The evasion of B. R. Shetty from the UAE and the name of his partner.	https://www.youtube.com/watch?v=xQzLFmIxHlw	https://www.youtube.com/watch?v=u1ZFA45hbP4
13 September 2020	الصفقة والسلاح	"Gaza, Hamas and the New Middle East", exclusive video shows how Hamas is circumventing the blockade of Gaza to develop its military capability, at a time when new strategic alliances are forming in the Middle East.	https://www.youtube.com/watch?v=od0KzQN4TpQ	https://www.youtube.com/watch?v=9lkarL5uWeI
20/12/2020	شركاء التجسس	"The Spy in Your Phone", "Spy partners", exclusive footage showing dangerous spyware, the Israeli program "Pegasus" and its penetration into the phones of media professionals and activists, used by Israel to eavesdrop on its opponents and even its allies.	https://www.youtube.com/watch?v=lfOgm1IcBd0	https://www.youtube.com/watch?v=fP-7jNJd5nA

== Popularity ==
The episodes are posted on Al Jazeera's website, YouTube page, and on social media such as Facebook. The YouTube videos have had millions of views.

== See also ==
- Bela Hodod
- The Opposite Direction
