= Avichay Adraee =

Arabic-language spokesperson of the Israel Defense Forces

- אביחי אדרעי
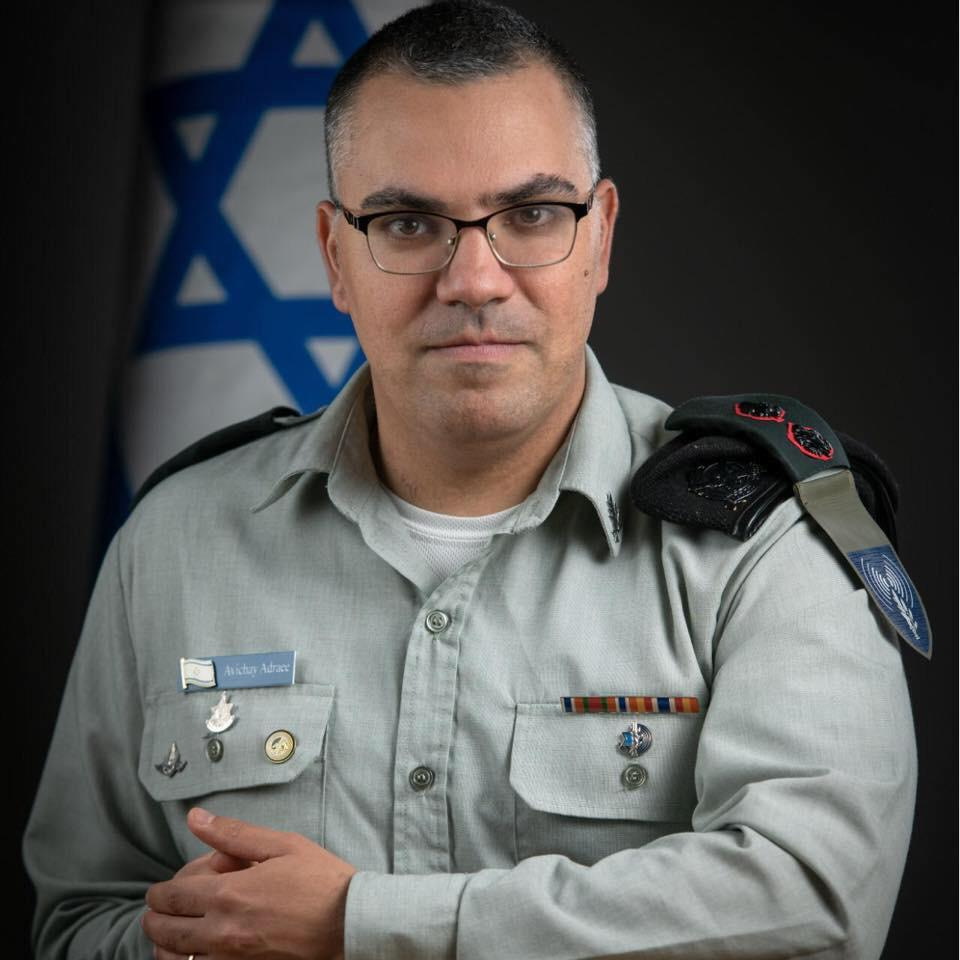
- Born: 19 July 1982 (age 44); Haifa, Israel
- Military career
- Allegiance: Israel
- Rank: Colonel
- Unit: IDF Spokesperson's Unit
- Commands: Head of the Arab Media Division of the IDF Spokesperson's Unit

Avichay Adraee (Hebrew: אביחי אדרעי; Arabic: أفيخاي أدرعي; born 19 July 1982) is a Colonel in the Israel Defense Forces who served as the head of the Arab media division of the IDF Spokesperson's Unit until 2026 and is engaged in military public diplomacy. As a result of his position, he receives extensive exposure in the Arab media and is known throughout the Arab world. He is of Syrian Jewish, Iraqi Jewish, and Turkish Jewish descent.

== Early life and career ==
Adraee was born in 1982 in Haifa. His maternal grandparents immigrated from Iraq, his grandparents from his father's side immigrated from Turkey and Syria. He studied at the Hebrew Reali School in Haifa. His father reportedly encouraged him to learn Arabic at home, and he later honed his skills in school and through watching classic Egyptian films. While he was exposed to Iraqi Arabic at home during his childhood, he states that he learned the Arabic he knows from school.

== Military career ==
When he enlisted in the IDF, he served in Unit 8200 in the Intelligence Corps, a unit that deals with signals intelligence. There, he expanded his knowledge of Arabic before joining the Spokesperson's Unit in 2005.

=== IDF Spokesperson's Unit ===
When he reached the rank of Staff Sergeant at the age of 22, Adraee was offered a position as head of the Arab media department in the IDF Spokesperson's Office following the Israeli disengagement from Gaza.

Adraee made his media debut during the 2006 Lebanon War. A few years prior, the Israeli Foreign Ministry sought to influence Arab public opinion by appointing Arabic-speaking spokespersons to engage with both local and international Arabic-language media. A 2004 Haaretz article highlighted a shift in communication strategy, noting that the prevailing view was "not to communicate with the enemy." The initial Israeli army spokesman faced criticism for being seen as too "Western." Adraee emphasized the role of social media, stating "The idea was to use social media not only to disseminate press releases but also to generate discourse among specific target audiences. We are looking to influence, not just do PR." Adraee was then sent to an Officer's Training School and was promoted to the rank of Major. In November 2018, he was promoted to the rank of lieutenant colonel.

Adraee has frequently appeared on Arabic media channels to represent the Israeli perspective. In 2018, he engaged in a debate on Al Jazeera’s "The Other Side" program, representing the Israeli position against former Syrian officer Saleh Qirata, who questioned Israel's aerial operations in Syria. During the discussion, Adraee asserted that the downing of an Israeli F-16 was not a significant event and highlighted Israel's continued air superiority and its capability to destroy a substantial portion of the Syrian anti-aircraft system in response. He affirmed that Israel would continue to assert its air superiority and conduct operations against regional threats, particularly from Iranian forces. That same year, Adraee sparked significant controversy by posting a two-part Arabic video on X that featured overt anti-Shia rhetoric and referenced scholars associated with the Islamic State (IS), leading many to believe this was an effort by Israel to incite Sunni sectarian tensions against Iran. He is frequently invited by major news channels, particularly in the Gulf, to provide commentary.

According to Omar Daoudi's study of Adraee's posts on Twitter/X during 'Operation Breaking Dawn' in 2022, the political messaging had "five core strategies: segmented digital diplomacy, justified power framing, digital credibility control, psychological fragmentation tactics, and strategic morality framing. These strategies targeted diverse Arabic-speaking audiences to influence perception and control the wartime narrative."

In 2024, Adraee accused Al Jazeera Media Network of concealing Hamas's activities. He claimed, "I am convinced that he knows the names of a great number of the Hamas terrorists among those killed in the school. But he presents a lie, the motivation for which has nothing to do with the residents of Gaza," referring to Al-Jazeera Arabic journalist Anas Al-Sharif, who had been reporting on the war in Gaza since its onset.

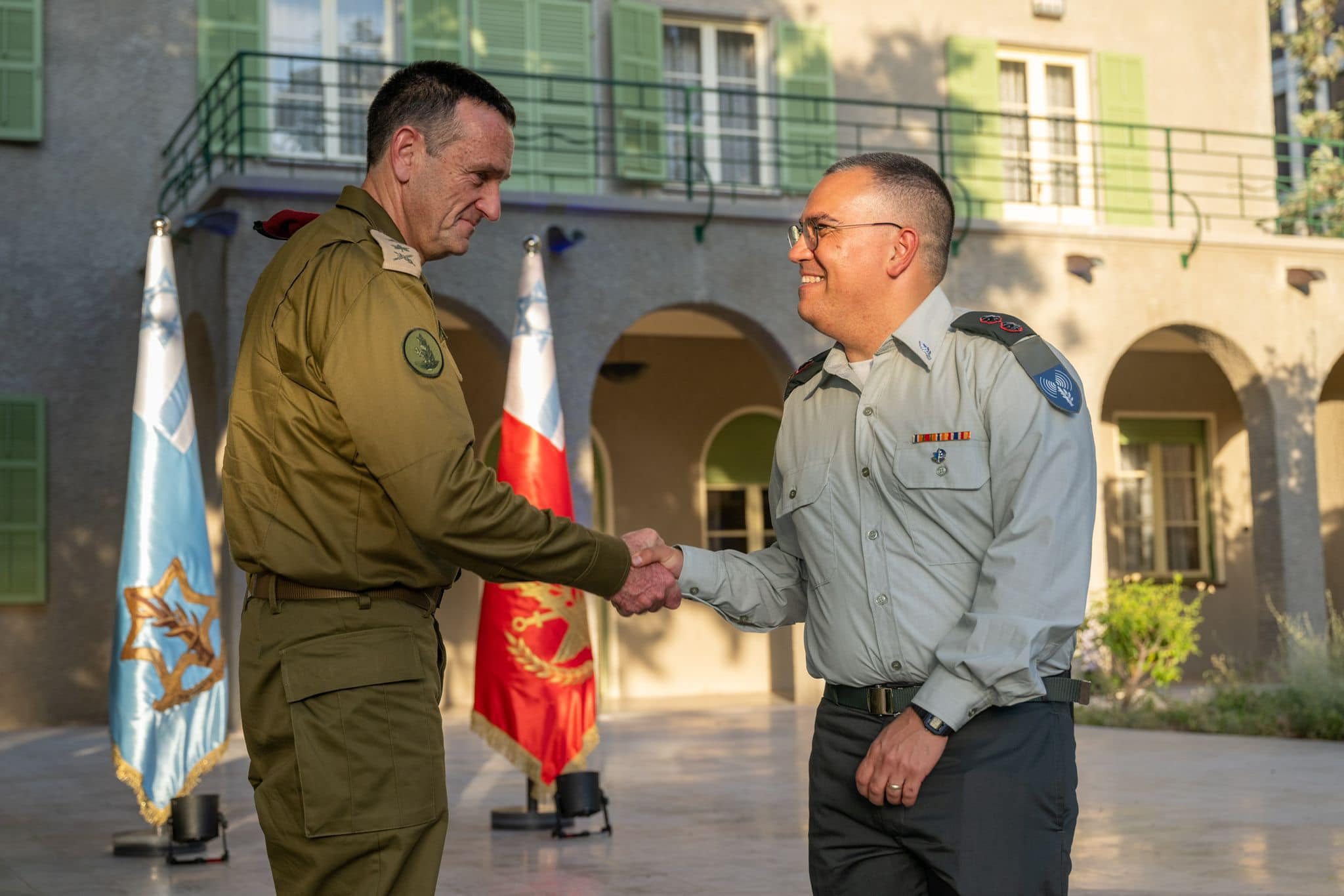
Chief of Staff Major General Herzi Halevi confers the rank of colonel to Avihai Adrai, July 2, 2024.

Throughout the Israel–Hamas war and Israel–Hezbollah conflict, Adraee's name has been frequently mentioned, from official statements to televised remarks that attract large audiences across the Middle East. He has issued warnings for residents in Gaza and Lebanon to evacuate specific areas ahead of impending Israeli air strikes. However, according to Amnesty International, these evacuation warnings have been described as "misleading," with civilians not being given adequate time to escape to safety.

In November 2025, it was reported that he would retire from the IDF after serving 20 years in its Spokesperson's Unit. On 15 February 2026, Adraee's role was officially handed over to Ella Waweya during a ceremony in Tel Aviv.

== Public image and regional influence ==
Over the years, through his military digital public diplomacy, Adraee has attracted a massive following in the Arab world. He has become a household name and a figure of both criticism and humor in the Middle East. He is particularly known for his strong social media presence on platforms like TikTok and X. As of December 2023, he had more than 554,000 followers on X, a slightly larger following on TikTok, and 2.5 million followers on Facebook. Adraee has been described as "Israel's face and voice to the Arabic-speaking world". He has developed a controversial reputation in recent years for quoting the hadith and Quran on social media, which many perceive as an attempt to provoke Muslims. He is recognized as "Sheikh Adraee" among Palestinians. Adraee also delivers sharp criticisms aimed at prominent figures such as former Hezbollah leader Hassan Nasrallah and former Hamas leader Yahya Sinwar, frequently utilizing videos and occasionally cartoons. While the Israeli military asserts that his intent is to engage with the Arabic-speaking community in a positive manner, he often serves as the first official Israeli voice that Arabic speakers encounter on social media during attempts to justify actions in Gaza and elsewhere, which many view as atrocities. Regional newspapers have raised alarms about his aims to "influence Arab consciences" while acknowledging Israel's evolving "more professional and sophisticated" propaganda tactics. Israeli media celebrate Adraee for his role in "building bridges between Israel and its neighbors."

Former Lebanese Prime Minister Saad Hariri faced criticism in January 2012 after he replied with a simple "hello" to a tweet from Adraee. Hariri later asserted that he was unaware of Adraee's identity and indicated that he would not have responded had he known, stating "Israel is our enemy." In 2013, Adraee encountered significant criticism from Egyptian social media users after sharing photographs from a visit to Egypt taken 13 years prior, during which he expressed fond memories of his trip, provoking backlash over perceptions of his presence as a "Zionist". In 2021, he told the Israeli online media outlet Mako, "I speak Arabic all day long, and I dream in Arabic from time to time."

== Personal life ==
Adraee lives in Rehovot.

On 15 January 2024, Adraee was reportedly the primary target of a car-ramming attack in Ra’anana, carried out by Palestinian militants motivated by his prominent role as the Israeli military's Arabic spokesman. This information was revealed in a police report a month later, indicating that the attackers had been planning the assault for months, with one of them having previously spotted Adraee, resulting in one fatality and multiple injuries during their violent spree.
