= Fatima Hassouna =

Palestinian photojournalist (1999–2025)

- فاطمة حسّونة
- Born: 1999; Gaza City, Gaza Strip, Palestine
- Died: 16 April 2025 (aged 25–26); Tuffah, Gaza City, Gaza Strip, Palestine
- Cause of death: Israeli airstrike
- Other name: Fatma Hassona
- Occupations: Photojournalist; artist
- Years active: 2023–2025
- Known for: Documenting the impact of the Gaza war; Cannes-selected documentary subject

Fatima Hassouna (/həˈsuːnə/ hə-SOO-nə; Arabic: فاطمة حسّونة; 1999 – 16 April 2025), sometimes spelled Fatma Hassona, was a Palestinian photojournalist whose work documented civilian life during the Gaza war. She gained international recognition for her visceral documentation of war impacts and became the subject of the documentary film Put Your Soul on Your Hand and Walk, selected for the ACID film programme shown in parallel with the 2025 Cannes Film Festival. She was killed alongside six family members in an Israeli airstrike on their Gaza City home on 16 April 2025.

== Biography ==
Hassouna was born in Gaza City in 1999 and graduated with a multimedia degree from the University College of Applied Sciences in Gaza. She began documenting life in Gaza after the October 7 attacks.

As one of the few local journalists able to document the war after Israel banned foreign reporters from Gaza, Hassouna chronicled forced civilian evacuations under Israeli military orders; destruction of infrastructure from airstrikes; civilian casualties and funeral rituals; and moments of resilience, including children playing in ruins. On 15 April 2025, she posted her final Instagram story, showing a Gaza sunset with the caption: "It's the first sunset in a long time". Put Your Soul on Your Hand and Walk (2025) features video conversations between Hassouna and the film's director, Sepideh Farsi. The film was selected for Cannes' ACID parallel section, an independent film programme shown during the official Cannes Film Festival. In their final exchange, Hassouna told Farsi: "I'll come to Cannes, but I have to return to Gaza. I don't want to leave".

== Death ==
Hassouna and six of her relatives, including her pregnant sister, were killed when an Israeli missile struck their family home in Gaza City's Tuffah neighborhood on 16 April 2025. The attack occurred one day after her documentary's selection for Cannes was announced. She had previously written on social media: "If I die, I want a loud death". Hassouna was one of at least 175 journalists killed in Gaza, Lebanon and Israel by April 2025 according to press freedom groups.

An investigation by UK research group Forensic Architecture concluded that Hassouna's death was the result of a targeted attack; the missiles dropped by the Israeli military had "specifically targeted the Hassona family's apartment on Floor 2" of the five-floor building. The Israel Defense Forces stated they targeted "a Hamas member involved in attacks against Israeli soldiers", claiming use of precision weapons. Sepideh Farsi rejected this justification, stating: "I know the whole family. It's nonsense".

== Legacy ==
In April 2025, a few days after Fatima Hassouna was killed, literary magazine ArabLit published Batool Abu Akleen's translation of Fatima Hassouna's collection of poems A Resonant Death. Palestinian photojournalist Samar Abu Elouf told Die Zeit that Fatima Hassouna was an example of a photographer who had been deliberately targeted by Israel.

== See also ==
- Israeli war crimes in the Gaza war
- Killing of journalists in the Gaza war
- List of journalists killed in the Gaza war
