= Put Your Soul on Your Hand and Walk =

2025 documentary film directed by Sepideh Farsi

- International release poster
- Arabic: ضع روحك على يدك وامشِ
- Directed by: Sepideh Farsi
- Produced by: Javad Djavahery; Sepideh Farsi
- Starring: Sepideh Farsi; Fatima Hassouna
- Cinematography: Sepideh Farsi
- Edited by: Sepideh Farsi; Farahnaz Sharifi
- Music by: Cinna Peyghamy
- Production companies: Rêves d'Eau Productions; 24images Production
- Distributed by: New Story (France)
- Release dates: 15 May 2025 (Cannes); 24 September 2025 (France)
- Running time: 113 minutes
- Countries: France; Palestine; Iran
- Languages: English; Arabic
- Box office: $110,353

Put Your Soul on Your Hand and Walk (Arabic: ضع روحك على يدك وامشِ) is a 2025 documentary film directed by Sepideh Farsi, depicting life in Gaza during the ongoing Israeli military campaign, captured through Farsi's video calls with Palestinian photojournalist Fatima Hassouna.

A co-production between France, Palestine and Iran, the documentary premiered at the ACID parallel section of the 2025 Cannes Film Festival on 15 May. It was theatrically released in France on 24 September by New Story.

Hassouna was killed in an Israeli airstrike alongside nine members of her family on 16 April 2025, the day after the film was selected for the ACID section. The festival released an official statement expressing condolences and criticizing the ongoing violence in Gaza.

== Synopsis ==
During early 2024, Sepideh Farsi, an Iranian filmmaker living in exile in Paris, travels to Cairo hoping to cross the Egyptian-Palestinian border and document the ongoing war in Gaza, but is prevented to enter in Rafah due to the Blockade of the Gaza Strip imposed by Israel.

Farsi, instead, documents the war through video calls interviews with photojournalist Fatima Hassouna, who lives alongside her family in a small apartment in the devastated Northern Gaza. Describing the harsh living conditions imposed to the Gaza population and the civilians casualties, including the killing of her own relatives, Hassouna is constantly interrupted by poor internet connection. The video calls are intertwined with Hassouna's photojournalism work, which was mainly focused in the children's suffering, and news reports providing context of the international response to the ongoing genocide.

As the war intensifies in late 2024, Hassouna continues to documents successive aerial bombings and military activity near her home in Gaza City, which resulted in the death of friends and her displacement to a shelter nearby.

On 15 April 2025, Farsi share the news of the film's selection to the 2025 Cannes Film Festival and Hassouna express her desire to attend its world premiere. Farsi ends the call requesting Hassouna's passport. On the following morning, 16 April 2025, Hassouna and nine relatives were killed in their sleep by an Israeli airstrike on their home.

By May 2025, OHCHR had confirmed the killing of 211 journalists in Gaza since 7 October, including 28 women.

== Production ==
The film was produced by Javad Djavahery of Rêves d'Eau Productions and co-produced by Annie Ohayon Dekel of 24images Production.

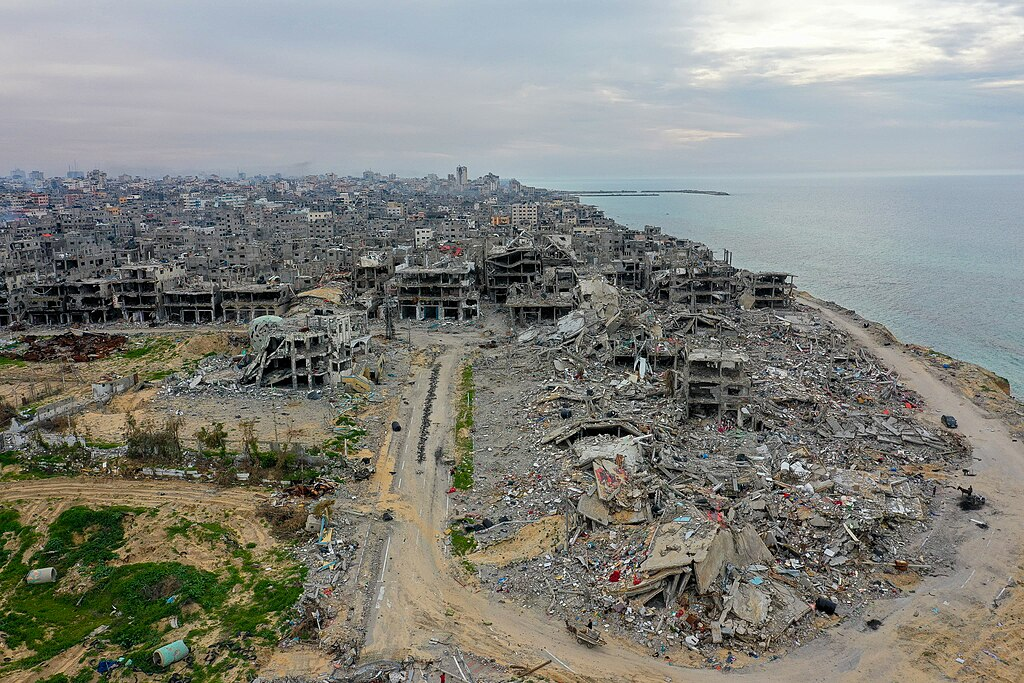
Gaza destruction in 2024, during the filming of the documentary

Unable to enter Gaza, the producers turned to Fatima Hassouna, a young photographer in the north of the territory, to document life under Israeli siege. In April 2024, director Sepideh Farsi had traveled to Cairo, where she filmed Palestinian refugees in the Egyptian capital. In Cairo, a man who had just left Gaza told her about Fatima Hassouna, a "young, brilliant and talented photographer". Farsi contacted Hassouna and after just two conversations with her, the idea arose to make a film from her point of view, about her life and that of the people trapped in the regularly bombarded coastal strip. The film is based on this almost year-long video exchange between the two women.

The original title of the film comes from a description by Fatima, revealed in one of her video conversations with Sepideh, about the ever-present danger of observing that every second she went out in the Gaza streets, "you put your soul on your hands and walk."

== Release ==
The film was selected to be screened in the ACID section at the 78th Cannes Film Festival, where it premiered on 15 May 2025. It released in French theaters on 24 September 2025, distributed by New Story.

The film had its UK premiere at the Edinburgh International Film Festival on 19 August 2025, and was theatrically released in the UK on 22 August 2025 by Dogwoof. Kino Lorber gave the film a limited theatrical release in the United States beginning at IFC Center in New York City on 5 November 2025.

== Reception ==
An open letter published in the run-up to the Cannes opening ceremony, condemning Hassouna's killing and denouncing the industry's "passivity" and "silence" regarding the events in Gaza, was signed by more than 350 actors, directors and producers – among them Richard Gere, Susan Sarandon, Joaquin Phoenix, Guillermo del Toro, Guy Pearce, Ralph Fiennes, David Cronenberg, Viggo Mortensen and Javier Bardem. Juliette Binoche, the jury president of the film festival, honoured Hassouna at the opening of the festival with the words: "She should have been here among us this evening [...] Art remains. It is a powerful testimony of our lives and dreams; and we, the audience, embrace it."

Jordan Mintzer's review in The Hollywood Reporter called the film "intimate portrait of a gifted young woman living through hell ... Put Your Soul on Your Hand and Walk is ultimately less a documentary exposé than a piece of raw unfiltered evidence, bearing witness to a tragedy that continues to unfold as this review is being written. The film, and Hassona's eye-opening photographs, will one day be added to the historical record detailing what happened in Gaza – which, in a broader sense, is also about what has happened to our civilization."

Allan Hunter of Screen International commented, "There is no hint of self-pity in Hassona's words as she describes the death of a friend or an aunt whose head is found in a different street to her body. She constantly thinks of others, helping to distribute any available aid to hungry children. Her cheerful optimism in the face of terrible conditions is inspirational. [...] Hassona's optimism even endures in their last call of April 15th, 2025 as she receives the news that their film has been accepted for Cannes. Hassona and members of her family were killed the following day. Farsi's film now stands as a powerful memorial to someone who was both ordinary and extraordinary."

France 24 reported that few films had attracted more attention at the 2025 Cannes Film Festival than the premiere of Put Your Soul On Your Hand and Walk, which "drew tears and a lengthy standing at an emotional premiere".

=== Accolades ===
Award / Film Festival	Date of ceremony	Category	Recipient(s)	Result	Ref.
Cannes Film Festival	24 May 2025	L'Œil d'or	Sepideh Farsi	Nominated	
Chicago International Film Festival	24 October 2025	Gold Hugo for Best Documentary	Put Your Soul on Your Hand and Walk	Won	
Asia Pacific Screen Awards	27 November 2025	Best Documentary Film	Sepideh Farsi and Javad Djavahery	Won	
Gotham Independent Film Awards	1 December 2025	Best Documentary Feature	Sepideh Farsi and Javad Djavahery	Nominated	
Cinema Eye Honors	8 January 2026	Outstanding Non-Fiction Feature	Sepideh Farsi, Javad Djavahery, Fatma Hassona, Cinna Peyghamy, and Pierre Carrasco	Nominated	
Cinema Eye Honors	8 January 2026	The Unforgettables	Fatma Hassouna	Won	
Lumière Awards	18 January 2026	Best Documentary	Put Your Soul on Your Hand and Walk	Won	
