= Committee to Protect Journalists =

American nonprofit organization

- Abbreviation: CPJ
- Formation: 1981; 45 years ago
- Type: 501(c)(3) nonprofit organization
- Tax ID no.: 13-3081500
- Purpose: Press freedom, journalist human rights and safety of journalists
- Headquarters: New York City, New York
- Location: US
- Coordinates: 40.74769°N 73.99327°W
- Region served: International
- President: Jodie Ginsberg (2022–present); Joel Simon (2006-2021); Ann Cooper (1998-2006)
- Affiliations: International Freedom of Expression Exchange
- Website: cpj.org

The Committee to Protect Journalists (CPJ) is an American 501(c)(3) nonprofit organization based in New York City, with correspondents around the world. CPJ promotes press freedom and defends the rights of journalists. The American Journalism Review has called the organization "Journalism's Red Cross." Since the late 1980s, CPJ has published an annual census of journalists killed or imprisoned in relation to their work.

== History and programs ==
The Committee to Protect Journalists was founded in 1981 in response to the harassment of Paraguayan journalist Alcibiades González Delvalle. Its founding honorary chairman was Walter Cronkite. Since 1991, it has held the annual CPJ International Press Freedom Awards Dinner, during which awards are given to journalists and press freedom advocates who have faced beatings, threats, intimidation, and imprisonment for reporting the news.

Since 1992, the organization has compiled an annual list of all journalists killed in the line of duty around the world. For 2017, it reported that 46 journalists had been killed in connection with their work, compared to 48 in 2016 and 72 in 2015; of those journalists killed, 18 had been murdered. In 2024, CPJ reported that 124 journalists were killed, surpassing the previous high of 113 in 2007. Of those 124, 103 were killed in the line of duty, and 85 of them were killed by Israel, all but three of whom were Palestinian journalists.

CPJ has also compiled a database that tracks journalists who have been killed, imprisoned, or are missing from 1992 to the present. In 2024, it reported that China and Israel had the most journalists in jail, with 50 and 43 respectively.

In 2008, the organization launched an annual "Impunity Index" of countries in which journalists are murdered and the killers are not prosecuted.

The organization is a founding member of the International Freedom of Expression Exchange (IFEX), a global network of more than seventy non-governmental organizations that monitors free-expression violations around the world and defends journalists, writers, and others persecuted for exercising their freedom of expression. In May 2016, a United Nations committee voted to deny consultative status to CPJ, primarily led by countries with poor press freedom like China, Sudan, and Russia. The ban was overturned, and CPJ was granted consultative status in July 2016.

In October 2016, the committee broke with its tradition of staying out of politics and warned about the danger it perceived Donald Trump posed to press freedom in the United States and around the world.

In June 2017, U.S. Representative Greg Gianforte was convicted of criminal assault in state court stemming from his assault of The Guardian political reporter Ben Jacobs the previous month. As a stipulation of his settlement with Jacobs, Gianforte donated $50,000 to the Committee to Protect Journalists, which said it would use the funds to support the new U.S. Press Freedom Tracker.

In July 2025, the committee urged international action to protect Al Jazeera correspondent Anas Al-Sharif and other journalists in Gaza, highlighting the deliberate risk faced by local reporters as the "last eyes and ears of the outside world" in Gaza.

In September 2025, the CPJ, along with IFEX and other press freedom organizations, called on EU member states for a partial or full suspension of the EU-Israel Association Agreement in order to protect journalists in Gaza.

On 12 May 2026, the CPJ was added to the Russian government's list of "undesirable organizations".

On June 25, 2026, the CPJ announced a full review of its database of journalists killed during the Gaza War and removed eight names after Hamas and Palestinian Islamic Jihad published obituaries identifying those individuals as combatants. Commenting on the database adjustments, CEO Jodie Ginsberg stated that "CPJ condemns in no uncertain terms the misrepresentation of combatants as journalists or media workers — or the misuse of 'Press' insignia. Such actions endanger every single individual journalist legitimately trying to report." After the review was announced, CPJ board member Nika Soon-Shiong, published a letter to the board raising concerns about the scope and purpose of the review. She was then removed from the board. Soon-Shiong said that "a handful of board members" were attempting to redefine the term "journalist" to exclude Palestinian and Lebanese journalists who worked for state-backed outlets. Palestinian journalist Mohammed El-Kurd raised a similar allegation, resulting in a social media back-lash against the CPJ. In response, the CPJ organised an emergency meeting and voted to leave the definition of journalist unchanged.

=== Global Impunity Index ===
In 2008, the CPJ launched an annual Global Impunity Index of countries in which journalists are murdered and the killers are not prosecuted. The index is a ranking of the rate of the failure of countries to prosecute killers of journalists.

The index has become associated with CPJ's reporting banner Getting Away with Murder, and has been used by news organizations, press-freedom groups, and international organizations as a reference point in debates about accountability for violence against journalists.

Early editions used a multi-year lookback and applied an inclusion threshold (countries generally had to reach a minimum number of unsolved cases to appear), which meant the index was not a complete list of every country with an unsolved journalist murder. In later years, the CPJ presented the index as a Global Impunity Index and published it as part of annual reporting packages on unresolved journalist killings. Publication was also timed to broader international advocacy moments, including the UN's International Day to End Impunity for Crimes against Journalists.

In October 2025, the CPJ stated that it would pause publication of its Global Impunity Index while it reviews the tool and reorients its work on impunity toward other mechanisms, such as developing targeted sanctions against perpetrators of crimes against journalists. Current and former CPJ staff said the CPJ had scrapped the index because Israel was going to top the rankings. The CPJ denied that pressure from donors and board members played a role in the decision.

Year	Top 3 countries
2025	Paused.
2024	Haiti, Israel, Somalia
2023	Syria, Somalia, Haiti
2022	Somalia, Syria, South Sudan
2021	Somalia, Syria, Iraq
2020	Somalia, Syria, Iraq
2019	Somalia, Syria, Iraq
2018	Somalia, Syria, Iraq
2017	Somalia, Syria, Iraq
2016	Somalia, Iraq, Syria
2015	Somalia, Iraq, Syria
2014	Iraq, Somalia, Philippines
2013	Iraq, Somalia, Philippines
2012	Iraq, Somalia, Philippines
2011	Iraq, Somalia, Philippines
2010	Iraq, Somalia, Philippines
2009	Iraq, Sierra Leone, Somalia
2008	Iraq, Sierra Leone, Somalia

== Publications ==
Years published	Name of report	Coverage
1982-1992	CPJ Update (43 issues)	Initial print publication, launched the same year as CPJ's founding.
1987-2023	Attacks on Press	Annual book: a worldwide survey of press freedom violations worldwide. 1987-1990: Short survey 1991: Expanded to a narrative format with details about each case. 2024: Discontinued print edition; replaced by online reports specifically for 1) imprisoned journalists, 2) killed journalists, 3) journalists murdered with impunity.
1988-1991	Backgrounder	Source
1992-present	Annual list of killed journalists worldwide	Annual list of journalists killed in the line of duty globally.
1992-2002	Dangerous Assignments (58 issues)	Print newsletter turned online magazine (in 1998) focusing on press freedom news.
1996-2001	Enemies of the Press	Top worst offenders of press freedom globally.
2008-2025	Impunity Index	Countries where journalists are murdered with impunity.
2012-2014	Risk List	Top countries where press freedom is in decline.
2015-2019	10 Most Censored Countries	Top countries with the most direct and indirect government censorship of the press.
2019-present	Online, interactive database	An expansion of the imprisoned and killed datasets, with a page for each journalist imprisoned, killed, or missing.
2024-present	In Focus reports	In-depth feature reporting about specific events and trends in press freedom worldwide.

Additionally, CPJ publishes safety and legal guides for journalists, giving them practical advice and resources for dangerous assignments, as well as regular feature reports and letters.

== See also ==
- Citizen Lab
- Democratic backsliding
- Freedom of the Press Foundation
- Reporters Committee for Freedom of the Press
- Reporters Without Borders
- Safety of journalists
