= Jodie Ginsberg =

British journalist and executive

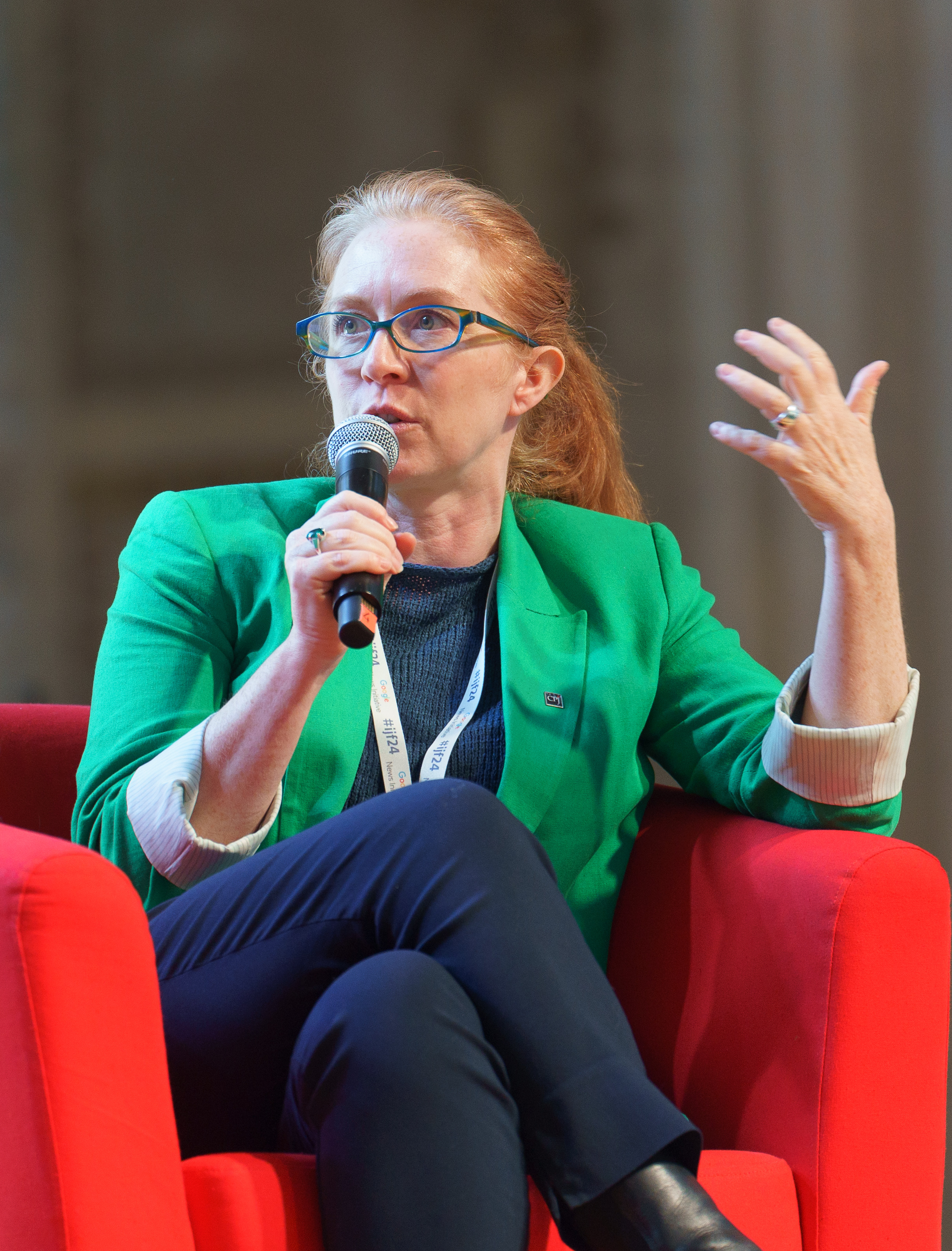
- Ginsberg in 2024
- Occupations: Journalist; chief executive of the Committee to Protect Journalists
- Known for: Head of Committee to Protect Journalists

Jodie Ginsberg is a British journalist and the chief executive of the Committee to Protect Journalists, a position she has held since 2022. Previously she worked at Reuters and Internews.

Among the issues she has worked on is raising awareness of the threats and risks experienced by Palestinian journalists in the Gaza Strip.

== Education ==
Ginsberg received a B.A. in English literature from Pembroke College, Cambridge and a postgraduate diploma in newspaper journalism from City, University of London.

== Career ==
Ginsberg began her career in 2000 as a graduate trainee at Thomson Reuters, where she began as a commodities reporter. She later worked as a foreign correspondent in Johannesburg, South Africa, focusing on the financial sector. She also worked in Dublin as Chief Correspondent, Ireland and as Bureau Chief of UK and Ireland, when she oversaw a staff of 40 reporters and news staff, and managed coverage of the 2008 financial crisis, 2010 general election, the royal wedding of Prince William and Kate Middleton, and the merger of the Thomson and Reuters U.K. newsrooms.

In 2014, Ginsberg was appointed CEO of Index on Censorship, a London-based freedom of expression group, which she led until 2020. Ginsberg is a regular speaker on journalist safety and access to information. Ginsberg succeeded Daniel Bruce and served as CEO for Internews Europe, a part of the Internews alliance. At Internews, Ginsberg oversaw delivery of programming, partnerships, fundraising, advocacy and outreach during a time of rapid organizational growth. Ginsberg formed new partnerships as media organizations adjusted to the effects of the COVID-19 pandemic. Ginsberg grew the public and funding profile of Internews and oversaw advocacy projects and research on media freedom and legal threats. From April 2022 onward, Ginsberg has served as the CEO of the committee to Protect Journalists.

== Views ==
In 2015, Jodie Ginsberg condemned the Charlie Hebdo shooting, and said people had the right to make speech that others find offensive.

In February 2025, she criticised US President Donald Trump for saying that the press is "the enemy of the people". In October she wrote about the threat to how the "public’s right to know" was real in the United States.
