= +972 Magazine =

Israel-based digital magazine covering the Israeli–Palestinian conflict

- Editor-in-chief: Ghousoon Bisharat
- Format: Web-based
- Founded: 2010
- Country: Israel
- Language: English
- Website: www.972mag.com

+972 Magazine is an Israeli left-wing news and opinion online magazine, established in August 2010 by a collective of a group of writers in Tel Aviv. Noam Sheizaf, a co-founder and the +972 chief executive officer, said they wanted to express a new and "mostly young voice which would take part in the international debate regarding Israel and Palestine". They named the website in reference to the 972 international dialing code, which is shared by Israel and some of the population in Palestine. The articles are written by a collection of bloggers primarily in English to reach an international audience.

== History, goals, management structure ==
+972 was founded in August 2010 by Dahlia Scheindlin, Lisa Goldman, Ami Kaufman, Dimi Reider, and Noam Sheizaf, journalists working in Tel Aviv who met and decided to create a shared internet platform; they already each had blogs and shared progressive views, including opposition to the Israeli occupation of Palestinian territories. Sarah Wildman, writing in The Nation, described +972 as:

Born in the summer of 2010 as an umbrella outfit for a group of (mostly) pre‑existing blogs. ... The site is now an online home for more than a dozen writers, a mix of Israelis, binational American- and Canadian-Israelis, and two Palestinians, all of whom occupy, if you'll forgive the term, space on the spectrum of the left.

By January 2012, about 15 journalists were affiliated with +972, and most wrote in English for a largely American audience.

+972 has a horizontal, collaborative organizational structure. Proposed new members are "voted on by the group and can be rejected". The collaborative hires and fires the editor, who does not have authority to hire or fire members.

The website has an "unorthodox journalistic ethos: All the website's bloggers have complete freedom to write whenever and whatever they want". According to The Nation, editors do not make assignments:

There is no hierarchy. Two rotating editors [recently changed to one editor] copy-edit and do a light legal sweep on each story. ... If they see something that needs to be changed for legal reasons, they'll notify the writer before making the change.

According to Liel Leibovitz, "the magazine's reported pieces ... adhere to sound journalistic practices of news gathering and unbiased reporting." Its commentary and essays, like its members, are dedicated "to promoting a progressive worldview of Israeli politics, advocating an end to the Israeli occupation of the West Bank, and protecting human and civil rights in Israel and Palestine"; they "support specific causes and are aimed at social and political change". Sarah Wildman, writing in The Nation in early 2012, says the magazine is "purposefully, uniformly progressive".

According to Leibovitz, +972 reporters are well-positioned to report from the West Bank. Several members of the cooperative are "frequent participants in joint Israeli–Palestinian demonstrations behind the Green Line", and work closely with "the activists who coordinate such protests".

In 2016, +972 was sued by Sawsan Khalife, its former chief executive officer, alleging that her dismissal was racially motivated. In its statement of defense, +972 denied the allegation, claiming Khalife was dismissed due to ever increasing dissatisfaction in her professional conduct. The parties settled their dispute in Tel Aviv Regional Labour Court, agreeing that the Court will award Khalife between 2.5 and 7 salaries worth of compensation as well as other benefits, while also agreeing that each side will withdraw its claims. The Court awarded Khalife 39,000 New Israeli Shekels.

== Impact ==
In a joint investigation by +972 Magazine and the Hebrew-language outlet Local Call, it was revealed that Microsoft's Azure cloud platform was being used by Unit 8200, Israel's elite spy agency. The report disclosed a secret project to transfer large volumes of sensitive intelligence into Azure, which began after a 2021 meeting between Microsoft's CEO Satya Nadella and the unit's commander.

The investigation found that the collaboration enabled Unit 8200 to build a system that collected, played back, and analyzed the content of millions of cellular calls from the entire population of Gaza and the West Bank. This surveillance data, which amounted to as much as 8,000 terabytes, was held in a Microsoft data center located in the Netherlands. The report also highlighted that this cloud-based platform was utilized in the Gaza offensive to prepare for airstrikes.

Following the publication of the joint investigation, Microsoft launched an external inquiry. This inquiry resulted in the tech giant terminating Unit 8200's access to some of its cloud storage and AI services.

== Funding ==
The magazine is largely financed by reader contributions. In addition, the Heinrich Böll Foundation, a German think-tank affiliated with the German Green Party, provided 6,000 euros in first-year funding in 2010. It continues to provide some funds. According to The Nation, the Social Justice Fund at the New Israel Fund granted +972 $10,000 in the first year, and made a one-year grant of $60,000 in early 2012.

Between 2018 and 2021, +972 and its partner, Local Call, received $450,000 from the Open Society Foundations.

=== Readers ===
The website's staff state that the vast majority of +972's readers live outside Israel, with about 40% in the United States and 20% in the Palestinian territories. According to CEO Noam Sheizaf, about 20% of its readership are Israeli. Israeli journalists Akiva Eldar and Merav Michaeli told The Nation that Israelis were mostly unaware of the existence of +972, with Michaeli describing it as simply "not relevant" to Israeli politics.

== Reception ==
In 2012, according to The Nation, writers for the left-wing newspaper Haaretz and left-wing Israeli intellectuals believed that the new web magazine fills an important gap in Israeli media reporting, primarily focusing on settlements and human rights abuses against Palestinians.

The same year, the Israeli right-wing NGO Monitor accused +972 of being antisemitic due to its reporting on Israeli apartheid.

In response, Sheizaf said: "The attack on +972 is being carried out in the standard way NGO Monitor, Im Tirzu and similar organizations work these days: Not by debating the content of our reports and commentary pieces, but by trying to delegitimize and silence us." In February 2012, Sheizaf said "Jewish American liberals are not on our side. [Most Americans] will only support my liberalism to a certain degree. When I fight for the right of an Arab woman to become a doctor, you will stand by and donate to the New Israel Fund. But if I say 'Jerusalem is an apartheid city,' which it is—Jerusalem is the worst place in the world in terms of citizenship laws—American liberals get goosebumps."

In 2025, the Nieman Foundation for Journalism awarded +972 the Louis M. Lyons Award for Conscience and Integrity in Journalism, celebrating the magazine's integrity to facts despite danger and adversity.

== Local Call ==
Local Call (Hebrew: שִׂיחָה מְקוֹמִית, romanized: Sikha Mekomit) is a Hebrew-language news site co-founded and co-published by Just Vision and 972 Advancement of Citizen Journalism (which also publishes +972 Magazine). It states that it is committed to democracy, peace, equality, social justice, transparency, freedom of information and resisting the Israeli occupation. Several Local Call and +972 Magazine writers publish on both platforms.

In 2016, Local Call ran an exclusive on a Jerusalem cinema complex that refused to work with cab drivers of Palestinian ethnicity, a story picked up by leading newscaster Channel 2. The site also published the "License to Kill" series, which examined cases in which IDF soldiers shot and killed Palestinians without a clear provocation, and with no consequences for the soldiers, a type of incident that usually goes unreported in Hebrew-language mainstream media.
