= Media coverage of the Gaza war =

The Gaza war has been extensively covered by media outlets around the world. This coverage ranges from traditional news outlets to social media platforms, and covers a wide variety of perspectives and narratives.

During the conflict, Israel imposed strict controls on international journalists, requiring military escorts and pre-broadcast reviews of their footage. In January 2024, the Supreme Court of Israel upheld these requirements on security grounds. Prominent U.S. media organizations like NBC and CNN confirmed that Israel had the authority to approve content from Gaza, with journalists embedded with the Israeli military required to submit materials for review.

Social media has played a significant role in sharing information, with platforms like TikTok seeing billions of views on related content. Research from October 2023 found that pro-Palestinian posts vastly outnumbered pro-Israeli ones on TikTok and Instagram. The conflict has led to the spread of misleading information and propaganda. Hamas has been banned from most social media platforms, although content from the group still circulates on sites like Telegram. In Gaza, local content creators documented their experiences, gaining significant followings.

In Israel, social media has been used to garner support for military actions, with the government running ads portraying Hamas negatively. Some Israeli influencers and content creators have mocked and dehumanized Palestinians, leading to widespread criticism. Videos posted by Israeli soldiers showing abuse and destruction in Gaza have gone viral, prompting international condemnation and internal investigations by the Israel Defence Forces.

The war has had a severe impact on Gaza's infrastructure and economy, with extensive damage to homes, hospitals, schools, and essential services. The conflict has caused significant job losses and economic decline in both the Gaza Strip and the West Bank. International scrutiny and media coverage have highlighted the human toll and the challenges faced by journalists operating in the region.

== Coverage by type ==
=== Social media ===
Social media has played a major part in sharing information about the conflict, especially platforms like TikTok where war-related videos have garnered billions of views. As of 10 October 2023, the hashtag #Palestine has some 27.8 billion views, and the hashtag #Israel has 23 billion on TikTok. Similar statistics were seen in later analysis with research done by the company Humanz, a tech company founded by former IDF intelligence officers. Humanz showed that during October 2023 there were 7.39 billion posts with pro-Israeli tags posted to Instagram and TikTok, while there were 109.61 billion posts with pro-Palestinian tags published on the sites in the same time. The documentation and spreading of information of the conflict is not a new phenomenon with multiple clips showing the continued conflict going viral since the app was first public. However, this has also resulted in the dissemination of misleading information and propaganda.

In mid-October, the Communications and digital minister Fahmi Fadzil confirmed that the Malaysian Communications and Multimedia Commission (MCMC) would meet with TikTok's parent company ByteDance following complaints from Malaysian TikTok users that content containing words like Hamas were removed by the social media company.

==== 'Esther Project' Israeli influencer network ====
News outlets reported that Israel is paying US influencers to improve its public image on Instagram, TikTok, and other social media platforms by paying them to post content. Records filed with the US Department of Justice, as required by the Foreign Agents Registration Act, show that the Israeli government is funding a clandestine political messaging campaign in the US, including influencer campaigning and more traditional big-budget political campaigning, to "assist with promoting cultural interchange between the United States and Israel." The campaign includes up to US$900,000 in payments and comes amid Israel's contract with AI-driven political campaign firm Clock Tower X and Brad Parscale, former campaign manager of Donald Trump, worth US$1.5 million per month.

According to the DOJ filings, the firm responsible for Israel's influencer network, Bridges Partner, was established in June 2025 Delaware by Israeli consultants Uri Steinberg and Yair Levi. The firm then received about $200,000 to recruit social media influencers based in the US. The arrangement went through the German division of the global public relations firm Havas.

In a meeting with influencers in New York, Netanyahu said, "We have to fight with the weapons that apply to the battlefields in which we engage, and the most important ones are on social media."

==== Hamas and in Palestine ====
In the hours after the attack, Hamas "employed a broad, sophisticated media strategy" using bot accounts to spread graphic, emotionally charged and false propaganda that was picked up and repeated by official accounts and foreign governments. Cyabra, an Israeli social media intelligence company found that on the day after the attack, one in four posts about the conflict on Facebook, Instagram, TikTok and X were from fake accounts. The New York Times described the start of the Gaza war as releasing a "deluge of online propaganda and disinformation" that was "larger than anything seen before". It described the conflict as "fast becoming a world war online" and stated that Russia, China, Iran and its proxies had used state media and covert influence campaigns on social media networks to support Hamas, undermine Israel, criticize the United States and cause unrest. James Rubin of the U.S. State Department's Global Engagement Center called coverage of the conflict as being swept up in "an undeclared information war with authoritarian countries".

Hamas has been barred from most social media sites and are unable to post on Facebook, Instagram and TikTok; however, some content from the group has been posted on other sites such as Telegram, where an account reportedly aligned to Hamas would post photos and videos in support of Hamas or documenting their actions, per the Atlantic Council. Following the attack, Hamas used bot accounts originating in countries such as Pakistan to sidestep bans on Facebook and X.

In Gaza, young content creators, such as Hind Khoudary, Plestia Alaqad, Motaz Azaiza, and Bisan Owda, documented their lives through the war, gaining significant followings on social media. A food blogger, Hamada Shaqoura, went viral on social media with videos of himself cooking meals out of canned humanitarian aid and distributing them to displaced children. In Yemen, teenage influencer Rashid, nicknamed "Timhouthi Chalamet", went viral on TikTok and X after posting a video of himself touring the captured ship Galaxy Leader and was later interviewed by streamer Hasan Piker. An image of a teenage boy holding onto his deceased mother in Gaza went viral on social media in February 2024. In June 2024, a former Meta employee sued the company for wrongful termination, stating it was suppressing Palestinian content. In July 2024, a Meta spokesperson stated an interview with Jeremy Scahill on Democracy Now! had been erroneously removed and was restored.

In March 2025, Israel raised claims that Gaza based blogger Saleh al-Jafarawi, who reportedly is known as "Hamas' social media star' raised funds for Hamas, and the rebuilding of Nasser Hospital in Khan Younis before pocketing the donations totaling about $4 million. The Palestinian Health Ministry issued a statement that denied any involvement with the fundraising via social media, and the ministry and Palestinian activist Mustafa Asfour condemned the actions.

==== In Israel ====
In January 2024 The Intercept reported that Israel tech volunteers in the group Iron Truth used their personal connections with those in Big Tech, including Facebook, Instagram, TikTok and X, to censor information from social media they deemed to be harmful to Israeli interests. The project was launched after October 7 by Dani Kaganovitch, a Tel Aviv-based software engineer at Google. A bot on Telegram was created to forward all flagged content to "sympathetic insiders" at Big Tech companies who would then act to remove it. The Intercept reported that "So far, nearly 2,000 participants have flagged a wide variety of posts for removal, from content that’s clearly racist or false to posts that are merely critical of Israel or sympathetic to Palestinians, according to chat logs reviewed by The Intercept." Emerson Brooking, a fellow with the Atlantic Council's Digital Forensic Research Lab, told The Intercept: "They’re not trying to ensure an open, secure, accessible online space for all, free from disinformation. They’re trying to target and remove information and disinformation that they see as harmful or dangerous to Israelis.” Kaganovitch said the project also has allies outside Israel's Silicon Valley. The group's organizers met with the director of a controversial Israeli government cyber unit, and its core team of more than 50 volunteers and 10 programmers includes a former member of the Israeli Parliament.

Videos of the attacks against Israel and its citizens were reportedly spread through paid partnership with the Israeli Foreign Affairs Ministry, and is a part of the Israeli governments sweeping social media campaign to build support for its military actions. Reportedly in the week following the October attacks by Hamas, Israel's Foreign Affairs Ministry had run about 30 ads that were seen over 4 million times on X, which portrayed Hamas as a "vicious terrorist group" similar to ISIS. Israeli travel blogger and social influencer Ella Kenan pivoted her content shortly after the 7 October attacks and began to push the hashtag 'HamasIsISIS' through her 200,000 followers. She also created a poster stating 'Greta Thunberg Supports ISIS' after Thunberg posted a picture of herself and friends at a rally for Gaza. The poster spread across multiple different social networks.

In early November 2023, a satirical video created by Israeli actress Noa Tishby was criticized for being Islamophobic and queerphobic after it went viral. The video was captioned as showing "...pro-Hamas college students on their journey to normalizing a massacre", adding that "a huge part of our Jewish culture is using humor to deal with trauma". In the video the actors stated that "everyone is welcome, LGBTQH..." with the H to stand for Hamas and held a fake interview with a freedom fighter in Gaza, while wearing outfits that were "oppression chic".

In December 2023 it was reported that a Telegram channel with at the time about 10,500 members was created and run by the IDF's Influencing Department. The channel was originally titled "The Avengers" but was soon changed to Azazel, to sound closer to the Hebrew pronunciation for Gaza and another word for hell and had posted over 700 photos and videos. Many of the videos showed the destruction of Gaza and mocking it or degrading Palestinians such as images where two Palestinian men were dressed as pigs and captioned claiming they were roaches and products of incest.

===== Trends =====
Social media platforms saw trends spreading misinformation and mocking the conflict and dehumanising Palestinians. An Israeli special effects and makeup artist drew ire and contempt from other users after posting a video of her pretending to be a Palestinian mother pleading for help before calling cut. Another part of the video shows her applying bruises with makeup with many calling out the insensitivity it showed. Other videos reportedly created and posted by Israeli citizens showed them mocking different aspects of the suffering of those in Palestine, with some wearing traditional dress and using makeup and talcum powder to appear to be suffering from the bombs, while others flaunt water and electricity while Palestinians have been cut off from those services.

Shortly after the September 2024 electronic device attacks in Lebanon, which caused the death of Hezbollah members, civilians and children, many Israeli and pro-Israel content creators began a trend mocking the explosions. Many, such as Israeli internet personality Noya Cohen, dressed in Muslin head scarf's and keffiyehs and picked up phones which then mock explode in their hands. Others such as pro-Israeli commentators like Michael Rapaport made comments and laughed at the explosion and resulting casualties.

===== IDF =====
The official IDF channel for informing international media is the International Media Branch of the IDF Spokesperson's Unit, which also runs social media accounts. Lt. Col. Richard Hecht became head of the IMB in 2019, but his predecessor Peter Lerner, who had retired from the IDF, came out of retirement to join the unit again after the Hamas attack. Jonathan Conricus also held interviews with foreign media. The IDF has a profile on TikTok, which had 1.7 million followers in 2021. Since the outbreak of the war, some IDF soldiers have independently gone viral and amassed large followings on social media. While some were viral videos, others created channels to document the daily life of soldiers during the war.

Videos posted by Israeli soldiers mocking, denigrating, and abusing Palestinians went viral, some of the most violent were used by South Africa at its ICJ case. In a video posted by in Gaza in late-January 2024, an Israeli soldier posed smiling as an entire neighborhood was blown up by the IDF. In another, an Israeli soldiers coerced blindfolded Palestinian detainees to pledge themselves as slaves. Widely circulated video and images at around 7 December 2023, showed dozens of Palestinian men in Northern Gaza blindfolded, stripped partially naked, and kneeling on the ground, guarded by Israeli soldiers. Other videos have shown IDF troops since the start of the conflict, purposefully destroying businesses while laughing, setting goods on fire while still in a vehicle, and going through private Gazan citizens' belongings. These videos and actions were condemned by IDF officials after being questioned on the members actions.

In February 2024, an image went viral showing an IDF soldier standing over an injured Palestinian man stripped naked and strapped to a chair. The U.S. Department of State responded to the viral photo stating it was "deeply troubled". The image was included in a BBC News Verify investigation along with several hundred other videos posted by IDF soldiers who had made no effort to conceal their identities. IDF officials initially stated that they had terminated the service of one soldier engaging in a potential breach of international law and identified by the BBC. However, they have now included the agreement that it will continue to act to identify unusual cases that potentially show misconduct. Other videos in the review include hundreds of detainees, with most stripped to their underwear, blindfolded and kneeling in front of the Israeli flag, while watched by IDF members, and interspersed with soldiers posing with guns.

Some of the videos posted appear to show IDF members pushing for the Israeli resettlement of Gaza, after illegal Israeli settlements had been evacuated in 2005. An IDF Rabbi Capt. Avihai Friedman was recorded telling a group of IDF soldiers that "It’s our country, all of it — Gaza too.....The whole promised land", while other soldiers expressed their support. In October 2024, an investigation into the social media posts of soldiers in Israel's 749 Combat Engineering Battalion found that their mission was "nothing less than a systematic, concerted, and deliberate effort" to erase the future of Palestinian people in the Gaza Strip, according to independent outlet Drop Site News.

Videos and pictures of Israeli soldiers going through Palestinian women's underwear in Gaza went viral, leading MIFTAH, a Palestinian women's advocacy organization, to state they showed "depravity".

In May 2024, BBC News reported on a small review of about 45 photos and videos posted by IDF troops from military actions into the occupied West Bank, which showed multiple instances of soldier misconduct. Actions documented and posted included entering homes at night and detaining Palestinians by blindfolding, binding them, at times removing women's headscarves or forcing them to say "Am Yisrael Chai" (The people of Israel live). In an October 2024 documentary, Al Jazeera published footage from IDF troops accounts of their actions in Gaza, with Palestinian novelist Susan Abulhawa being quoted as saying "We live in an era of technology, and this has been described as the first live-streamed genocide in history." Some of the war crime claims raised in the documentary with the corresponding footage from social media accounts are that the IDF systematically target civilians, journalists, and others, ransacking homes, gleefully celebrating explosions, and going through women's underwear drawers.

In November 2024, IDF soldiers expressed surprise at efforts to identify them through their online activity, and worried about potential repercussions.

==== Activism ====
Activists used social media, such as X and TikTok, to share information about the war. Pro-Palestinian activists adopted the watermelon emoji as a symbol to represent solidarity with the people of Gaza. TikTok was a source of ire for some, with people such as former US president Barack Obama criticizing "TikTok activism" for obscuring context. Celebrities, including Sacha Baron Cohen and Amy Schumer, held a private meeting with TikTok executives accusing them of spreading antisemitism. TikTok stated it was not biased, but that young people were organically more supportive of Palestine. On 18 November, Elon Musk announced any user who used the phrases "decolonization" or "from the river to the sea" would be suspended from X. (Note: The announcement came after Disney, Apple, Paramount and Lionsgate pulled advertisements from X following Musk's endorsement of an antisemitic conspiracy theory, which US president Joe Biden called "abhorrent".) Pro-Palestinian content creators in the U.S. reported widespread shadowbanning. Critics of Israel also alleged they were censored or shadowbanned on the comment sections of Finnish national media outlets in November.

Anonymous Sudan, a hacker group, launched a DDoS attack on ChatGPT after Tal Broda – a member of OpenAI's leadership – made social media posts which expressed support for Israel and called for more intense bombing in Gaza.

In January 2024, the Israeli government reportedly purchased a technological system for conducting large-scale influence campaigns online. In February 2024, Israeli supporters adopted AI tools to report pro-Palestinian content en masse for supposedly violating site guidelines.

Misinformation in the Gaza war is generated by machine learning models were used by activists to solicit support, as well as to create the artificial impression of broader support. AI-generated images and deepfakes went viral online, though they were simultaneously fact-checked. Technology companies were accused of profiting from AI-generated images related to the war, as well as for building models that generated content reflecting anti-Palestinian biases.

The Israeli prosecutor's office sent over 8,000 removal requests to Meta and TikTok for content related to the war, resulting in 94% of the requests being removed. The Intercept reported Meta had allowed Hebrew and Arabic-language ads, generated by digital rights advocates to test the limits of Facebook's machine-learning moderation, calling for a "holocaust for the Palestinians". In December 2023, Meta's independent oversight board released a report stating Facebook overly censored conflict-related posts, with civil rights organizations stating Meta had suppressed Palestinian content.

Influence operations linked to Iran have been identified by Microsoft and OpenAI, "intended to undermine support for Israel and trust in U.S. democracy more broadly", using artificial intelligence tools. Analyst John Hultquist of Google's Mandiant Intelligence noted the creativity of Iran-based influence networks, referring to accounts on X pretending to be left-leaning Americans supporting the Palestinian cause which were found in 2022. During the Gaza war, Iran's strategy has included providing financial assistance, and posing as students, to stoke student-organized protests.

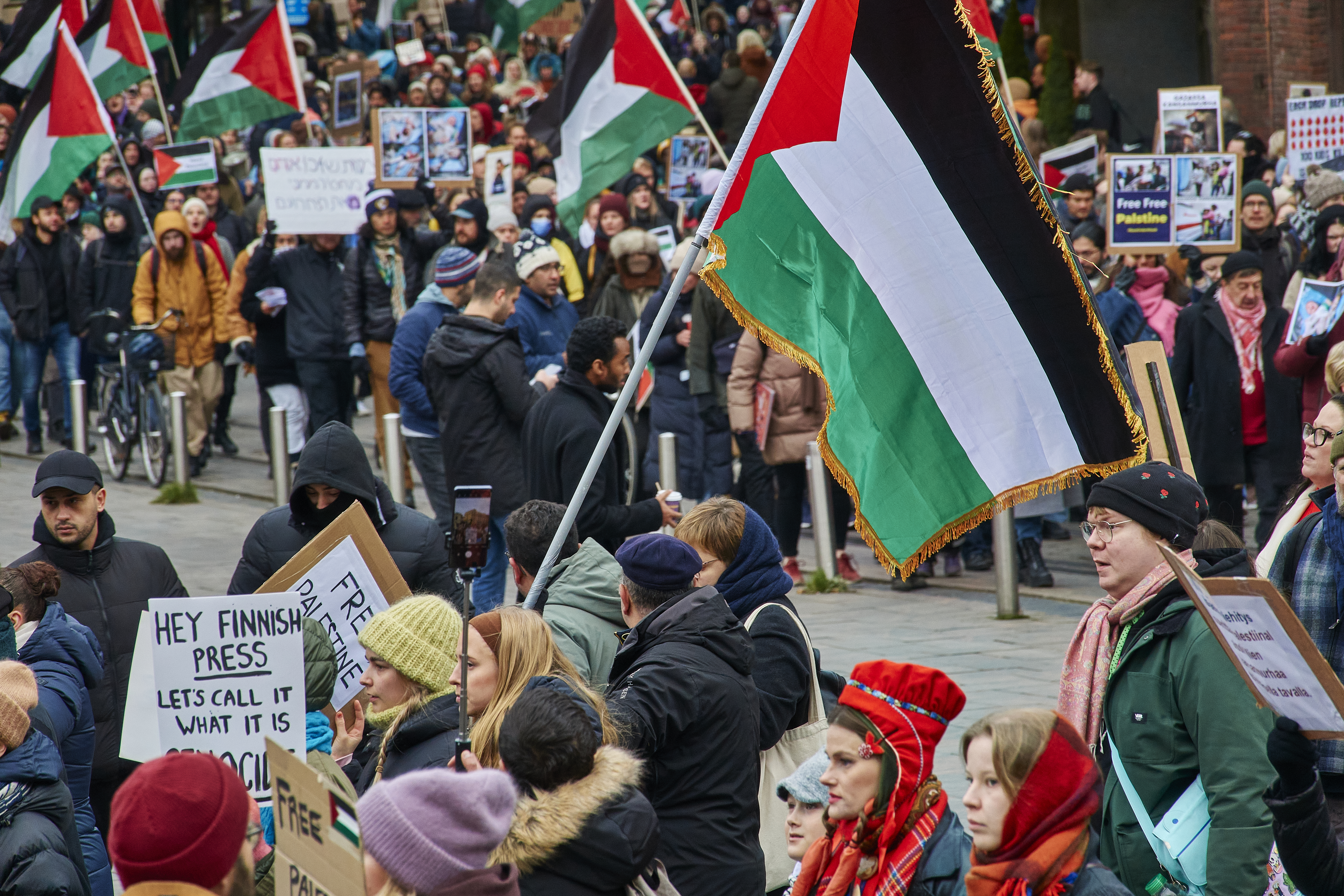
Pro-Palestinian protest in Helsinki, Finland, 28 October 2023

=== Messaging platforms ===
Messaging apps such as Telegram have been utilized to share information regarding the conflict. Nonetheless, these platforms have been criticized for inadequate content moderation, enabling the dissemination of violent videos and false information. X (formerly Twitter) was criticized by the European Union for not taking action against fake news spreaders in the website.

=== Wikipedia ===
In October 2023, Slate reporter Stephen Harrison praised the English Wikipedia for its coverage of the war, noting that it "retains the seemingly traditional policy of requiring that most its information derive from reliable secondary sources such as newspapers, not primary sources like an individual's social media posts... this old-school rule—requiring vetting and publication from a traditional media outlet—seems to have shielded Wikipedia from some of the latest social media disinformation campaigns."

The Hebrew Wikipedia has experienced edit wars over content related to the war. The Arabic Wikipedia has expressed solidarity with Palestinians, and briefly shut down in December 2023 for a day "in support of the residents of the Gaza Strip and in protest of the continuing attacks, while calling for an end to the war and the spread of peace."

Dr. Shlomit Aharoni Lir stated in a March 2024 report that "The state of the articles dealing with the conflict is alarming in its lack of neutrality." The English Wikipedia categorized the Anti-Defamation League as an unreliable source on the conflict in June 2024, drawing condemnation from the organization.

=== Use of artificial intelligence ===
A video posted by Donald Trump to social media on 26 February 2025 to illustrate his vision of a "Trump Gaza", depicted as a resort with golden Trump statues and Elon Musk throwing money around

During the conflict, the Israeli government and Israeli cyber companies have deployed artificial intelligence (AI) tools and bot farms to spread disinformation and spread graphic, emotionally charged and false propaganda to dehumanize Palestinians, sow division among supporters of Palestine by targeting Black lawmakers, and exert pressure on politicians to support Israel's actions. The Intercept reported that: "At the center of Israel’s information warfare campaign is a tactical mission to dehumanize Palestinians and to flood the public discourse with a stream of false, unsubstantiated, and unverifiable allegations." One such covert campaign was commissioned by Israel's Ministry of Diaspora Affairs. The ministry allocated about $2 million to the operation, and used political marketing firm Stoic based in Tel Aviv to carry it out, according officials and documents reviewed by The New York Times. The campaign was started after the October 7 attack, and remained active on X at the time of The New York Times report in June 2024. At the peak of the campaign it used hundreds of fake accounts posing as Americans on X, Facebook and Instagram to post pro-Israel comments, focusing on U.S. lawmakers, particularly those who are Black and from the Democratic Party, including Hakeem Jeffries, the House minority leader from New York, and Raphael Warnock, Senator from Georgia. ChatGPT was deployed to generate many of the posts. The campaign also involved the creation of three fake English-language news sites featuring pro-Israel articles.

The use of AI to draw attention to both sides has been used throughout the war, with creators spreading the images which was seen by thousands of individuals. In March 2024, an AI-image that attempted to call attention to the ongoing war was shared from a pro-Palestinian account with the roofs of refugee tents spelling out "All Eyes on Rafah" after an Israeli airstrike reportedly started a massive fire in the Rafah refugee camp.

In February 2025 a pro-Israeli social media account posted a video promoting the idea of Trumps reimagined and taken over Gaza, which was later posted by Trump on his Truth Social and Instagram accounts. The video showed multiple images of a Gaza rebuilt to focus on Trump, including a golden statue of Trump and ended with a shot of Trump and Netanyahu sunbathing on a Gaza beach. The video was one of many photos and videos created by AI that were posted to pro-Israeli accounts, that championed the idea of Trump and Israel taking over Gaza.

== Information from Gaza ==
Israel requires all international journalists covering the war from Gaza to be accompanied by Israeli military escorts and to allow the military to review their footage before broadcast. As a condition for gaining entry into Gaza with Israeli protection, US media organizations CNN and NBC have consented to Israel's military overseeing and limiting the activities of their journalists in the region. This development follows a period of media blackout and the loss of 34 Palestinian journalists in Gaza. On 9 January, the Israeli Supreme Court ruled there was no requirement to loosen its requirements on journalists' entry, citing security grounds.

Direct attacks on telecommunications infrastructure by Israel, electricity blockades and fuel shortages have caused the near-total collapse of Gaza's largest cell network providers. Lack of internet access has obstructed people in Gaza including journalists from communicating with people outside Gaza. The Egyptian journalist and writer Mirna El Helbawi discovered that eSIMs (a programmable SIM card built into a smartphone) could be used by people in Gaza to connect to remote telecommunication networks whilst roaming (primarily Egyptian and Israeli networks). The first people she was able to connect by this method were Egyptian journalist Ahmed El-Madhoun and Palestinian journalist Hind Khoudary. By December 2023, 200,000 Gazans (approximately 10% of the population) had received internet access through an eSIM provided by Connecting Humanity.

In July 2024, the Foreign Press Association criticized Israel for imposing an "information blackout" on Gaza, stating, "It raises questions about what Israel doesn't want international journalists to see". The same month, more than 60 of the world's largest media organizations called on Israel to allow international media access into the Gaza Strip.

== Coverage by country ==
=== Israel ===
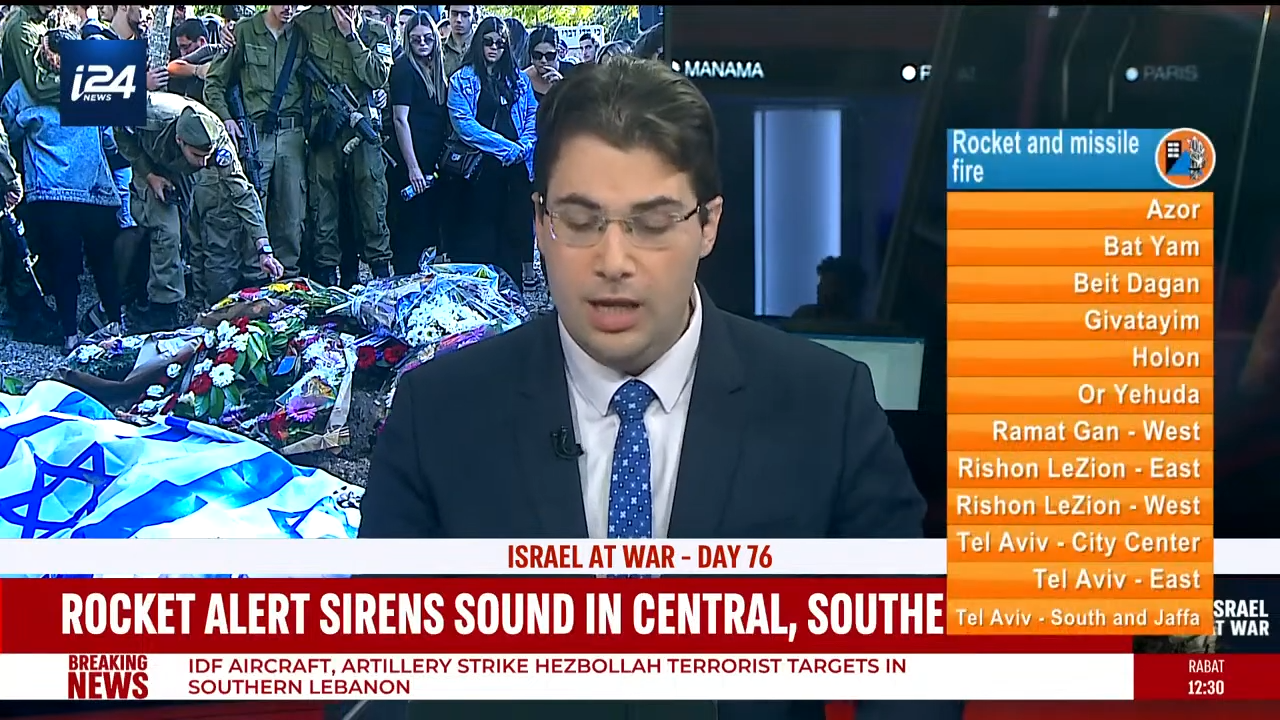
HFC alerts in English, at i24News

On 11 October 2023, the Israeli Public Broadcasting Corporation (KAN) started a channel that scrolls through the names of the people killed in the October 7 attack, much like the broadcasts on Israel's Memorial Day. On 22 October, home front alerts started showing in English on i24NEWS's English channel.

On 26 December 2023, an anti-tank missile from a Hezbollah unit hit next to Channel 13 News team while they were interviewing farmer at Dovev, for an article following a prior Hezbollah assault that killed an employee of the Israel Electric Corporation, and injured five workers who were repairing electric lines. On 6 January, while an Israeli journalist crew carried out an interview in the middle of a road in Tuffah, they were fired upon. Omri Assenheim, who conducted the interview, commented that "journalism must be done during the war as well, even if it's dangerous. I don't have a death wish."

On 13 February 2024, Israel's Second Authority for Television and Radio opened an inquiry into Channel 13 for a show panelist saying "Netanyahu Wants Hostages Dead". On February 20, A bill proposed by Zvika Fogel would grant the power to close local offices and restrict access to websites of international media outlets deemed "harmful to state security" to National Security Minister Itamar Ben-Gvir.

Between February and March 2024, mainstream Israeli television networks Channels 14 and 13 aired videos, reportedly described as "snuff films" which appear to show detained Palestinian prisoners being mistreated inside Israeli prisons. The videos are described as actual interrogation sessions of prisoners, who are shown bound and blindfolded, while being made to kneel on the floor. A warden is recorded stating "They have no mattresses ... They have nothing…we control them 100%—their food, their shackling, their sleep ... [we] show them we are the masters of the house". In August 2024, an IDF soldier who was accused of raping a Palestinian detainee at the Sde Teiman detention camp was interviewed on television.

Haaretz's Itay Rom has criticized the media for its alleged bias against Israel. He gave several examples of "flimsy reporting" from CNN, BBC and Sky News, of which he believes result from ingrained belief that Israel is the "villain" of the story, which allows any claim made against it—even ones that are proven false—to pass. He wrote that "while attitudes towards Israel's claims is somewhere along the spectrum between healthy journalistic skepticism and complete distrust, Hamas's claims about the numbers of killed civilians in the Strip are accepted as the word of God." He also has raised criticisms against Israeli media, much of which, he states, "ignores and erases the Gazan story".

Israeli comedy show Eretz Nehederet has aired several sketches in English since the beginning of the war, criticizing the BBC's alleged anti-Israel bias. One of the sketches shows the BBC taking Hamas's attribution at face value immediately, praising Hamas as “the most credible not-terrorist organization in the world” and ignoring a Hamas fighter that admits firing rocket at own hospital. Another sketch portrayed a sympathetic mock "interview" with Yahya Sinwar, stating "Hamas freedom fighters peacefully attacked Israel", and a mock BBC anchor saying "Hamas is left with no human shields at all! So unfair", later referring to Israeli kidnapped crying babies as "torturing him through sleep deprivation" and "occupying his house". The sketches went viral online.

The Israel Defense Forces (IDF) has a designated Spokesperson's Unit which is responsible for the IDF's information policy and deals with the media relations during peace and wartime. It serves as a liaison between the military and the domestic and foreign media markets as well as the general public and is a key player for the public diplomacy of Israel.

Anat Saragusti said that most mainstream Israeli media "completely ignored what's going on on the Palestinian side – the human casualties there, the numbers of children killed in this war. The Israeli audience simply did not see that at all." A report from Israeli think tank Molad found that only 3% of newscasts on Channel 12 mentioned the war's impact on Gazan civilians.

=== Czechia ===
Public media such as ČT24 or iRozhlas and mainstream channels such as Seznam.cz have a strong pro-Israel stance.

=== France ===
At the start of Ramadan, the French newspaper Libération ran a cartoon mocking the starvation of Palestinians in Gaza, showing a woman scolding a man chasing after rats and cockroaches because it was not yet time to break fast.

=== Qatar ===
On 25 October, Axios reported that US Secretary of State Antony Blinken had asked Qatari prime minister Sheikh Mohammed bin Abdulrahman bin Jassim Al Thani to moderate Al Jazeera's coverage of the war. It is believed that Blinken was referring to Al Jazeera's Arabic language channel and not its English channels.

=== Iran ===
==== Islamic Republic of Iran Broadcasting ====
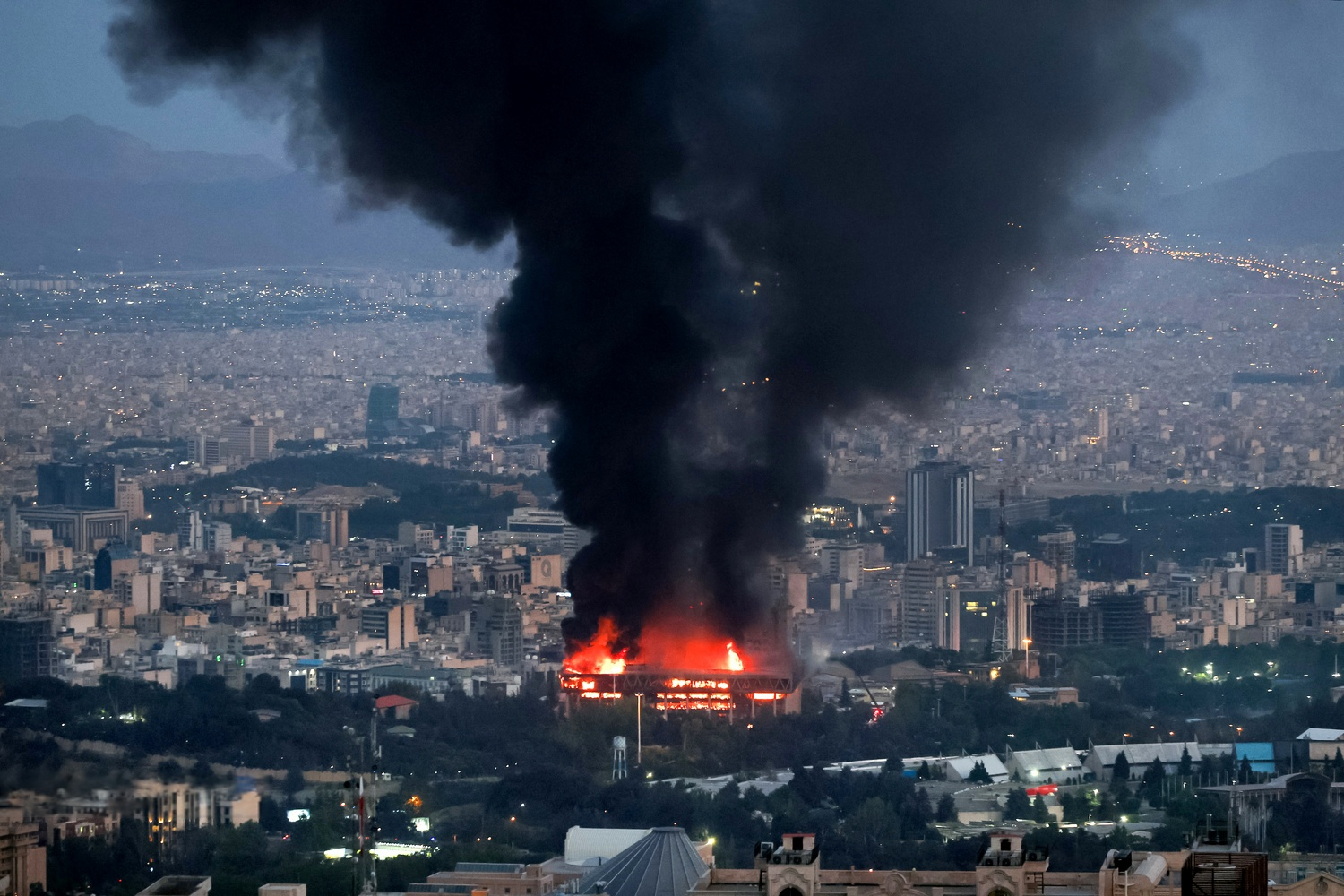
The headquarters of Islamic Republic of Iran Broadcasting in Tehran after an Israeli bombing during a live broadcast, 16 June 2025.

Islamic Republic of Iran Broadcasting published images of the capture of commanders of Nagorno-Karabakh by the Azerbaijani army in September 2023 as the capture of Israeli commanders by Hamas. Mohammadreza Bagheri, a presenter at channel 3 of Iran Broadcasting, said that the viewers should not worry about the dead or wounded Israelis, no matter if they are soldiers or civilians, because they are all occupiers who live in the lands and homes of Palestinians.

=== United Kingdom ===
In March 2024, analysis by the Muslim Council of Britain's Centre for Media Monitoring found that British media coverage had consistently been "favourable to an Israeli narrative which has constantly promoted the attacks on Gaza and in the West Bank as a war between light and darkness".

==== BBC ====
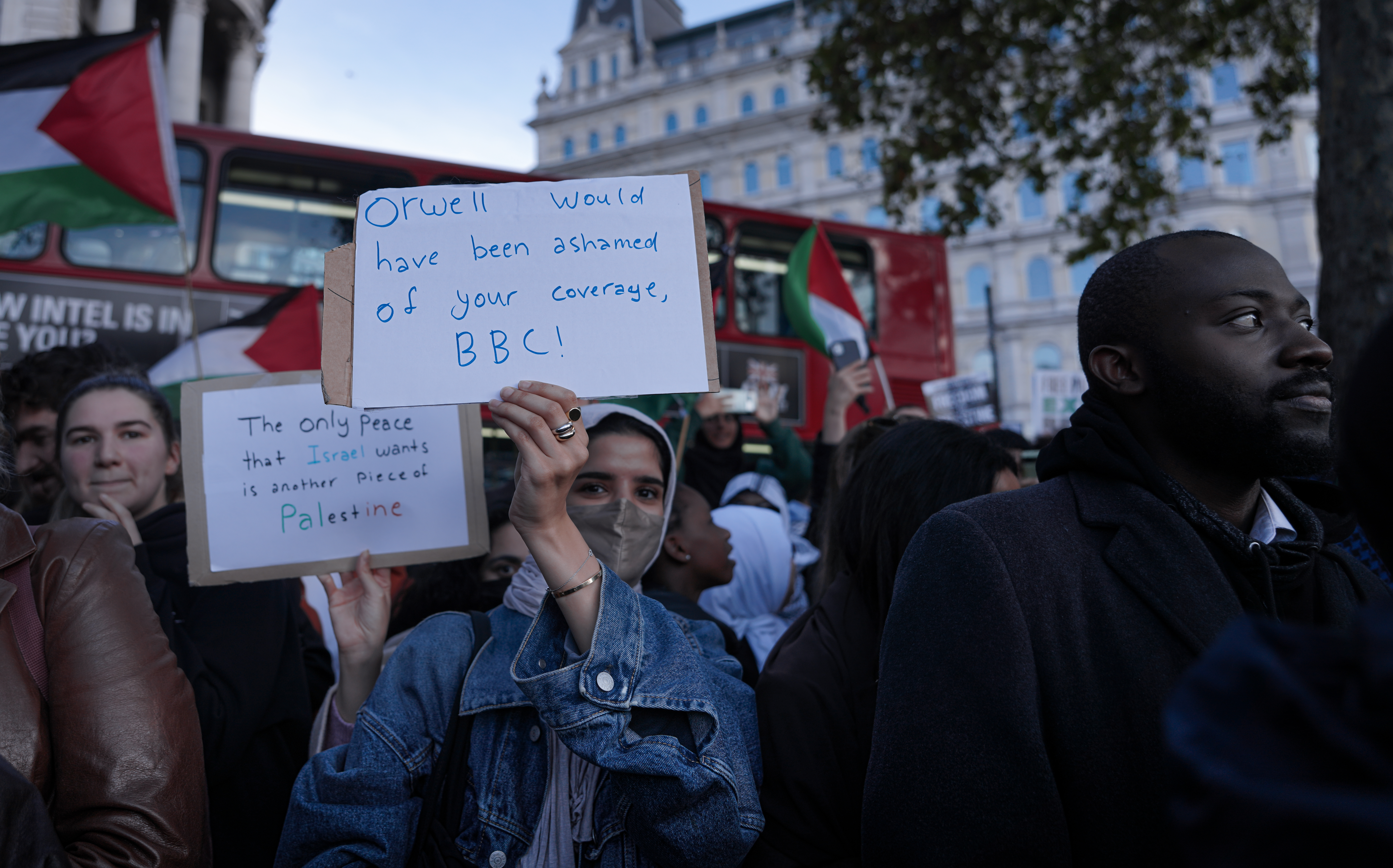
Pro-Palestinian protester accusing the BBC of pro-Israel bias, 4 November 2023

In October 2023, the BBC was criticized by journalists and the UK Secretary of State for Defence Grant Shapps, for using the term "militants" over "terrorists" to refer to members of Hamas, which the British government considers to be a terrorist organization. The BBC responded with a statement saying that to report objectively, they would not use the term "terrorist" without attribution, and that they had featured contributors who have described Hamas as terrorists.

In November 2023 BBC News Arabic launched Gaza Daily in response to the ongoing conflict and to provide any listeners in Gaza with the latest information and developments, along with safety advice and where to find humanitarian aid.

Analysis of BBC coverage by openDemocracy published at the start of 2024 found Palestinian perspectives were "totally absent" from the network's coverage, and that the BBC's coverage regularly described Israeli deaths with words like "murder", "massacre", "atrocity", and "slaughter" but not for Palestinian deaths.

==== Dismissal of Steve Bell ====
On 19 October, The Guardian announced the dismissal of editorial cartoonist Steve Bell, who had been contributing to the newspaper since 1983, after he made a caricature of Israeli Prime Minister Benjamin Netanyahu holding a scalpel and preparing to make a Gaza Strip-shaped incision in his abdomen. While Bell said it was inspired by a similar caricature of US President Lyndon Johnson during the Vietnam War, he said he was accused of antisemitism for allegedly evoking the "pound of flesh" demanded by the Jewish character Shylock in William Shakespeare's play The Merchant of Venice.

==== Piers Morgan Uncensored ====
Piers Morgan hosted numerous interviews regarding Gaza on his show Piers Morgan Uncensored. Morgan interviewed Egyptian comedian, television host and surgeon Bassem Youssef, who is best known for his political satire, on October 17 and November 1. Youssef pointed out the context of the Israel-Palestine conflict, the juxtaposition against the Ukrainian-Russia war and the ongoing Gaza war often in his satirical humor.

Morgan has been criticized for his frequent use of the question "Do you condemn Hamas?" at the beginning of interviews with pro-Palestinian guests, by Mehdi Hasan, Bassem Youssef, and others.

==== The Jewish Chronicle ====
Neve Gordon—in an examination of the appearances of the word 'antisemitism' before and after October 7, 2023, in The Jewish Chronicle, the oldest Jewish newspaper—argues that "the data reveals that TJC has been exaggerating and instrumentalising a Zionist notion of antisemitism to foment moral panic, mobilising the language of trauma and injury to continuously reassert a notion of Jewish victimhood" in support of a "justificatory framework that operates by claiming injury and then using the alleged injury to set in motion a series of oppressive actions against individuals, groups and institutions."

==== Other ====
In January 2024, a news report on Sky News received heavy criticism for describing a lethal Israeli shooting of a three-year-old toddler as the death of a "young lady" after "accidentally a stray bullet found its way into the van". Sky News apologized "unreservedly" to MK Danny Danon for the "complete inappropriateness " of a Sky correspondent asking Danon how his calls for the "relocation" for Gazans were different than "relocations" that occurred during World War II. In an open letter, Danon urged Sky to fire the woman who had asked him the question.

A January 2024 interview between Julia Hartley-Brewer and Mustafa Barghouti on TalkTV sparked more than 15,000 complaints to Ofcom after Hartley-Brewer repeatedly cut off and screamed at Barghouti.

During a public discussion titled "The Challenges and Dilemmas of Covering the Israeli-Palestinian Conflict," Janine Zacharia, a former Middle East correspondent and Stanford lecturer, provided valuable insights into how major news organizations approach reporting on the Gaza war. The event, hosted by Stanford's Department of Communication, was part of a series of educational initiatives organized by the university to enhance comprehension of the conflict's intricate history and complexities.

=== United States ===
==== General coverage ====
According to Journalist Rami George Khouri, there are three types of media in the United States: The mainstream media, which is steadily losing its advertising and audience, and which broadly reflects the views of the American and Israeli governments; Independent and progressive media that challenge mainstream views but struggle to survive financially; and the kaleidoscopic world of social media that dominates the young under-30 audience. People who get their news primarily from mainstream TV and cable channels "are more supportive of Israel's war effort, less likely to think Israel is committing war crimes", wrote Ryan Grim, a journalist at the progressive publication The Intercept. But Americans who rely on social media, podcasts and YouTube are generally on the side of the Palestinians.

Following the self-immolation of Aaron Bushnell, U.S. media sources were criticized for failing to mention Bushnell's reason for self-immolating — opposition to the Gaza genocide.

Axios reported tensions between White House press secretary Karine Jean-Pierre and National Security Council spokesman John Kirby. Y.L. Al-Sheikh, in an editorial in The Nation, wrote that if Biden was the public face of his administration's policies in Gaza, then Kirby, Jean-Pierre, and Matthew Miller were its "robotic enforcers."

According to an analysis, major US newspapers like The New York Times, The Washington Post and the Los Angeles Times have demonstrated a clear bias in their coverage of the Gaza conflict, favoring Israel. The Intercept, a US-based news outlet, reported on January 9 that these leading newspapers consistently portrayed Palestinians in a negative light during Israel's attacks on Gaza.

In late October 2023, the New York Times corrected its initial acceptance of Hamas's account of the Al-Ahli Baptist Hospital blast in Gaza City; other mainstream news outlets remained silent or corrected their reports without admitting fault. In 2024, failures to disclose a source's connection to Hamas were noted in the case of Hussein Owda, by three outlets (NYT, NBC News and Al Jazeera).

An analysis conducted by The Intercept revealed that The New York Times, The Washington Post and the Los Angeles Times exhibited a consistent bias against Palestinians in their coverage of Israel's war on Gaza. These prominent print media outlets hold significant sway in shaping American perspectives on the Israeli-Palestinian conflict. However, they largely overlooked the profound consequences of Israel's siege and bombing campaign on children and journalists residing in the Gaza Strip. Furthermore, these major U.S. newspapers placed disproportionate emphasis on Israeli casualties during the conflict and employed emotive language to depict the killings of Israelis, while neglecting to do the same for Palestinians.

==== CNN ====
A report by The Intercept detailed that CNN's coverage of the war undergoes review by the Israeli military's censor. (Note: Nearly every international journalist who entered Gaza during the war was only allowed to enter with an Israeli military escort and after military review of footage before publication.) The report indicated that terms such as "war crime" and "genocide" were not allowed to be used on-air. An additional report by The Intercept found major U.S. media outlets skewed their coverage in favor of Israelis, using the word "horrific" to describe Israeli suffering 36 times versus only 4 times for Palestinians. It also found the words "child" or "children" were rarely used when discussing Palestinian minors. CNN faced criticism for not airing South Africa's introductory remarks during the South Africa v. Israel case at the International Court of Justice.

CNN staff accused the network of being so biased in favor of Israel that it was committing "journalistic malpractice." In leaked audio from an internal meeting, host Christine Amanpour expressed "real distress" over CNN's editorial policies regarding the war. In an op-ed in Al Jazeera, American University of Beirut professor Rami George Khouri stated, "Mainstream media organisations in the West, from the New York Times and the Wall Street Journal to CNN and NBC, have long helped Israel spread its propaganda and achieve its political aims... For example, they usually refer to blatant acts of ethnic cleansing and forced displacement in Gaza as 'evacuations', and claim Israel is 'defending itself' against 'terror.'"

In September 2024, CNN journalists Dana Bash and Jake Tapper accused U.S. Representative Rashida Tlaib of antisemitism for supposedly questioning Michigan Attorney General Dana Nessel's ability to do her job due to her being Jewish, in response to Nessel's decision to prosecute pro-Palestinian campus protesters from the University of Michigan. Tlaib had not made such a comment about Nessel's ethnicity in an interview with the Detroit Metro Times, where she had talked about anti-Palestinian discrimination. The false claim was repeated by Jewish Insider and Anti-Defamation League CEO Jonathan Greenblatt. Tapper later claimed that he "misspoke", and Bash provided a "clarification" on her show.

==== The Wall Street Journal ====
A WSJ article in early February 2024 by Steven Stalinsky called Dearborn, Michigan, the United States' "jihad capital" and was condemned as racist. Police protection ramped up in Dearborn following Stalinsky's article, with U.S. President Joe Biden stating that Dearborn shouldn't be blamed for "the words of a small few." Dearborn mayor Abdullah Hammoud called Stalinsky's editorial "bigoted" and "Islamophobic." Congressmember Pramila Jayapal and Senator Gary Peters both condemned Stalinsky's article.

==== The New York Times ====
A New York Times article in early February 2024 by Thomas Friedman compared Middle Eastern countries to parasites and insects and was condemned as racist. The New York Times was accused of major discrepancies between its coverage of the allegation of sexual assault on 7 October and family testimony. One of the article's authors, Anat Schwartz, was found to have liked posts calling to "turn Gaza into a slaughterhouse." The Intercept stated that the New York Times had responded to pressures from CAMERA and "consistently delegitimized Palestinian deaths and cultivated 'a gross imbalance' in coverage to pro-Israeli sources and voices." Writing in LitHub, professor Steven Thrasher wrote that the coverage of the war by The New York Times was "assisting the military goals of American empire". In April 2024, The Intercept reported on a leaked internal memo from The New York Times, which told writers to avoid the terms "genocide," "ethnic cleansing," and "occupied territory" and not to use the term Palestine "except in very rare cases."

The Intercept reported that a 2024 quantitative analysis of more than 1000 articles from major newspapers including The New York Times showed a consistent bias against Palestinians. The analysis revealed a disproportionate focus on Israeli deaths, the use of emotive language when describing the killings of Israelis but not Palestinians, and an imbalanced portrayal of antisemitic incidents in the U.S., with minimal attention given to anti-Muslim racism following October 7. The findings include that the terms "Israeli" or "Israel" appear more frequently than "Palestinian" or related variations, despite Palestinian deaths significantly exceeding Israeli deaths. On average, Palestinians were mentioned once for every two Palestinian deaths, while Israelis were mentioned eight times for every Israeli death, a rate 16 times higher per death than that of Palestinians.

A 2024 Bar Ilan study of 1,398 NYT articles found that 647 articles (46%) expressed empathy only towards Palestinians, while 147 articles (10.5%) expressed empathy only towards Israelis. Of 276 Top News headlines in 7 months, 55% expressed empathy only toward Palestinians, and 5.8% expressed empathy towards Israelis; 130 of these headlines criticized Israel, while only 6 headlines criticized Hamas.

Yale professor Edieal Pinker examined 1,561 The New York Times articles published between October 7, 2023, and June 7, 2024, that included "Israel” and “Gaza”, finding that “Israel” was mentioned three times more frequently than “Hamas". By omitting mention of deaths of Hamas fighters, Pinker argued, the NYT led readers to believe Israel was simply bombing Gaza, "diminishing Hamas’s responsibility for their situation and the continuation of the war".

Israeli Prime Minister Benjamin Netanyahu threatened to sue The New York Times in August 2025 over an article about starvation in Gaza, but did not follow through.

== Double standards in media coverage ==
Accusations of double standards in media coverage of conflicts have emerged. Critics, including journalist Aaron Bastani, Irish MP Richard Boyd Barrett, and Amnesty International, have argued that Ukraine's right to self-defense is often commended by international leaders, yet the same support is not always extended to the Palestinian resistance to Israel's occupation in the West Bank and Gaza. Jordan's Foreign Minister, Ayman Safadi, has similarly accused the international community of applying "double standards" when it comes to Palestinians. Vidhya Krishnan opined that reporting pattern from past wars and crises by Western newsrooms is journalism of the victor in service of supremacist colonialism.

According to +972 Magazine, the "uneventful nature" of the structural violence Israel inflicts on Palestinians—the predominant form of violence in the Israeli–Palestinian conflict—makes it less suitable for media coverage in comparison with the "kinetic violence" of a rocket attack.

=== BBC coverage ===
On 23 November 2023, eight UK-based journalists employed by the BBC wrote to Al Jazeera to register their concern over the double standard of the BBC's coverage of the Gaza war, contrasting it with the "unflinching" reporting on Russian war crimes in Ukraine. The journalists accused the media corporation of omitting historical context and investing in humanizing Israeli victims while failing to humanize Palestinian victims, alleging that senior newsroom figures did not adequately hold Israeli officials accountable and actively interfered in reporting to minimize the coverage of Israeli atrocities against Palestinians. In an op-ed, Jeremy Corbyn criticized the BBC for not airing South Africa's court presentation during South Africa v. Israel yet showing Israel's defense the following day.

In November 2024, 230 media professionals, including over 100 BBC staff, signed a letter stating that the BBC's coverage of the war failed its own editorial standards in its pro-Israel biases. In December 2024, Owen Jones reported in an article for Drop Site News, citing 13 anonymous BBC staffers, that its Middle East editor Raffi Berg was acting to skew the BBC's coverage in favor of Israel. In November 2025, Berg sued Jones for libel, alleging Jones's article had damaged his reputation and resulted in "an onslaught of hatred, intimidation and threats". Jones said in response to the lawsuit, "I strongly disagree with Mr Berg's accusations, and I look forward to vigorously defending my reporting in court."

In July 2025, 111 anonymous BBC journalists, freelancers, and industry figures signed a letter expressing concern over what they described as censorship and a lack of transparency in the BBC's editorial decisions regarding its reporting on Israel and Palestine. The letter was issued shortly before Channel 4 aired Gaza: Doctors Under Attack, a documentary originally commissioned by the BBC but later shelved over concerns it might be perceived as lacking impartiality. The signatories criticised senior management for obstructing coverage without explanation and alleged that the BBC had failed to adequately report on topics such as UK arms sales to Israel. The letter called on the BBC to uphold its commitment to impartial journalism and to improve its coverage of the conflict.

The Centre for Media Monitoring (CFMM), an organisation that monitors media reports on Islam and Muslims, published a report in June 2025, analysing 3,873 articles and 32,092 broadcast segments from 7 October 2023 to 6 October 2024, found that the BBC used emotive terms four times as much for Israeli victims and applied "massacre" 18 times more to Israeli casualties than Palestinian casualties. The study also concluded that perspectives by Israelis were shared by the BBC 11 times more compared to Palestinians and gives Israeli deaths 33 times more coverage than Palestinians.

=== Australian media coverage ===
In an open letter to Australian media outlets, journalists criticized a double standard in trust given to the IDF, stating, "The Israeli government is also an actor in this conflict, with mounting evidence it is committing war crimes and a documented history of sharing misinformation. The Israeli government's version of events should never be reported verbatim without context or fact-checking."

The Media Watch of ABC News Australia on 19 February 2024 argued that The Australian and The Sydney Morning Herald were running more stories on the 7 October attack, humanising the Israeli victims between October 2023 and February 2024, while the Palestinian casualties during the conflict within the same timeframe received less news coverage despite the greater death toll and crises such as starvation. Documents released from ABC News in March 2024 showed staff concerns about persistent pro-Israel bias, including "accepting 'Israeli facts and figures with no ifs or buts' while questioning Palestinian viewpoints and avoiding the word 'Palestine' itself."

=== U.S. media coverage ===
In an investigation by The Guardian, it was reported that CNN staff had criticized their network's coverage of the war, accusing it of promoting Israeli propaganda and giving more attention to Israeli suffering and the Israeli narrative of the war. One staffer claimed that this bias was systematic and institutionalized, as many journalists' stories were forced to be cleared by channel's Jerusalem bureau before publication. Staffers claimed that statements by Hamas and the Palestinian Authority were rarely reported on, while Israeli statements were taken at face value. The staff blamed CNN's newly appointed CNN director Mark Thompson for the alleged biased reporting. A CNN spokesperson denied the charges of bias.

Writing in Time Magazine, writer Elena Dudum criticized the U.S. media's use of passive voice when discussing Palestinians in Gaza, writing, "The obfuscation of responsibility is facilitated by a structure often overlooked since grade school: grammar. At this moment, grammar has the indelible power to become a tool of the oppressor, with the passive voice the most relied-upon weapon of all." In the New York Review of Books, author Isabella Hammad criticized western media's focus on anti-war activists' language, rather than on the "gravity of Israel’s assault on Gaza".

In October 2024, a group of CNN and BBC journalists stated their organizations had "systematic double standards" in terms of their war coverage and frequently violated journalistic principles. A study by The Nation further found a "consistent double standard" in CNN and MSNBC coverage, portraying Palestinians less sympathetically than either Israelis or Ukrainians.

In May 2026, The Intercept published a media content analysis examining US news framing during the first year of the conflict, evaluating more than 12,000 print articles from major publications, including The New York Times, The Washington Post, CNN.com, Politico, Axios, USA Today, and The Associated Press, alongside approximately 5,000 television segments broadcast on CNN and MSNBC. The findings indicated systemic linguistic and thematic disparities that favored Israel, noting that its "right to defend itself" was invoked over 100 times more frequently in print media and 94 times more frequently on television networks than any equivalent right for Palestinians. An asymmetry was found in the editorial use of highly emotive terms like "massacre" and "slaughter"; when used in an outlet's own editorial voice over a 100-day tracking period, these words were applied exclusively to describe Israeli casualties. Language qualifiers and thematic prominence also shifted over the course of the war; while mainstream media outlets frequently invoked the term "human shields" regarding Palestinian fighters operating near civilian infrastructure, television news segments documented completely omitted instances of the Israeli military utilizing tactics that meet the legal definition of human shields. The use of the qualifiers "Hamas-run" or "Hamas-controlled" when citing casualty figures from the Gaza Health Ministry skyrocketed following the Al-Ahli Arab Hospital explosion on 17 October 2023, despite neither CNN nor MSNBC using these qualifiers prior to that date, and despite historical reliance on those figures by international bodies. Significant disparities were noted in domestic news coverage, with select mainstream homepages dedicating substantially more prominent, long-term coverage to the plagiarism and campus antisemitism controversies surrounding former Harvard University President Claudine Gay than to high-profile civilian casualties in Gaza, such as the killing of five-year-old Palestinian girl Hind Rajab by the IDF.

== Killings, arrests, threats, cyberattacks, and censorship ==
=== Killings of journalists by Israel ===
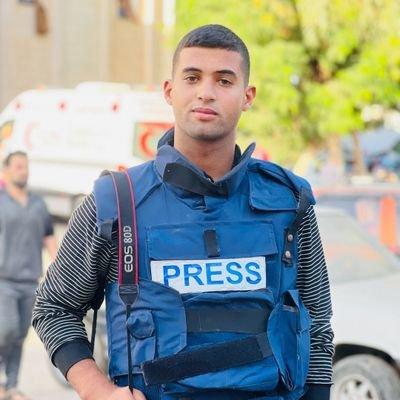
"Language makes genocide justifiable. A reason why we are still being bombed after 243 days is because of The New York Times and most Western media." – Hossam Shabat, a Palestinian journalist whom Israel accused without evidence of being a member of Hamas and killed in an airstrike 24 March 2025

Hundreds of journalists have been killed in the Gaza war and related military engagements. Nearly 75% of journalists killed worldwide in 2023 were Palestinian reporters who died in Israeli attacks in Gaza. In October 2025 the Committee to Project Journalists stated that the number of journalists and media workers killed by Israel in the war exceeds the total number killed worldwide between 2020 and 2022. CPJ Regional Director Sara Qudah added that "Since October 7, 2023, Palestinian journalists have been slaughtered with impunity, while the world watches. This is a direct, unprecedented assault on press freedom."

Israel has accused several Palestinian journalists—including Hossam Shabat, Samer Abu Daqqa, Hamza Al-Dahdouh, Ismail Al-Ghoul, Anas Al-Sharif, and others—of being members of Hamas or Palestinian Islamic Jihad and has killed them with targeted airstrikes. According to +972 Magazine, a special unit in the Israeli military called the "Legitimization Cell" works to identify journalists in Gaza that it can depict as undercover Hamas operatives to render them legitimate targets to kill, in an attempt to stifle media coverage of its activities in Gaza and quell international outrage over Israel's killing of journalists.

=== Arrest of journalists by Israel ===
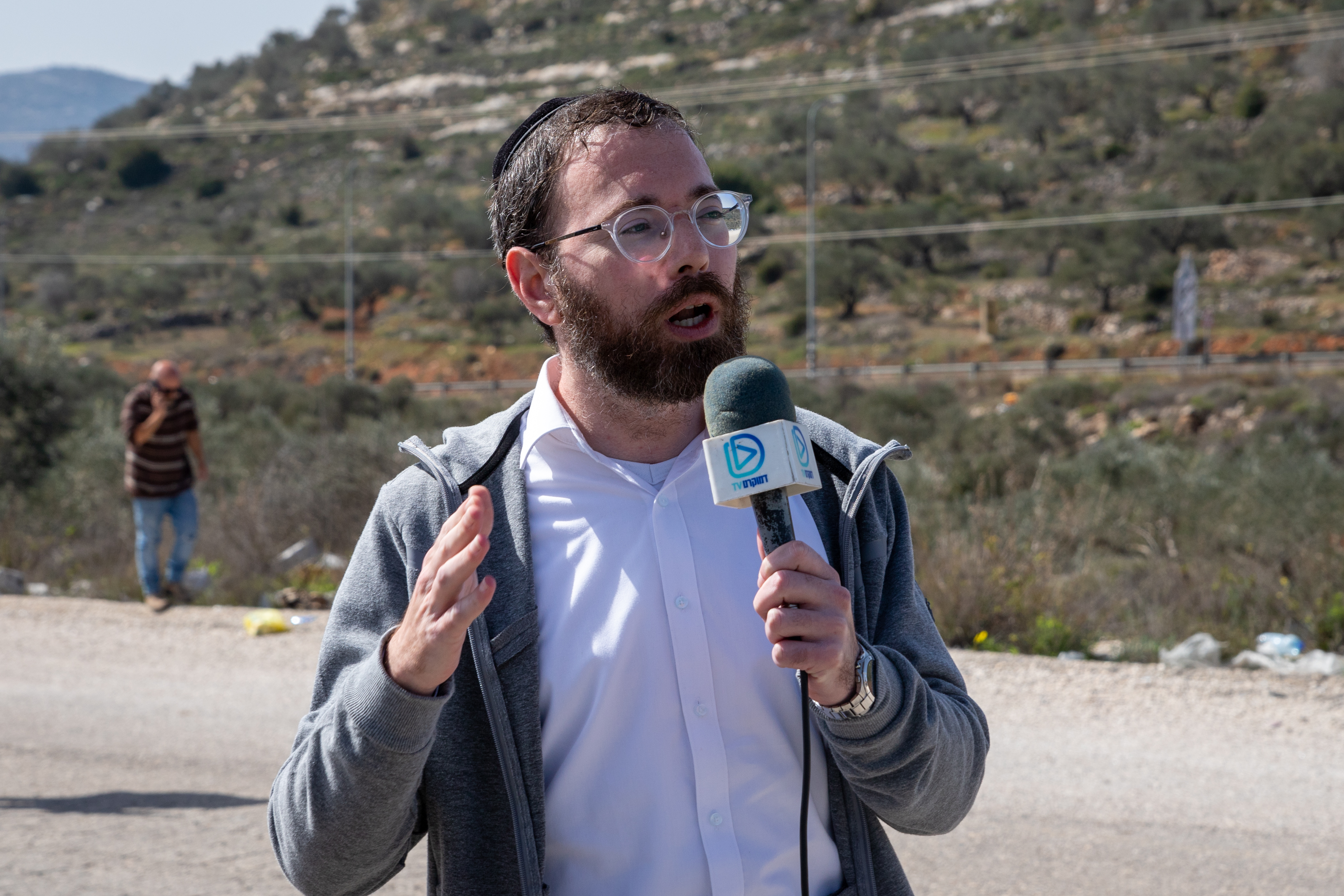
In addition to several Palestinian journalists, Israeli-Haredi journalist Israel Frey was arrested after the office of the State Attorney of Israel accused him of "inciting terrorism."

The committee to Protect Journalists has reported that, in addition to the growing number of journalists killed and injured in the war, journalists in Palestine and Israel have also been subject to 13 arrests, as well as "numerous assaults, threats, cyberattacks, and censorship".

In October 2023, 10 journalists were arrested by the IDF, including Lama Khater, a freelance writer for Middle East Monitor and the Palestinian news website Felesteen; Mohamed Bader of al-Hadath newspaper; and the 62-year-old journalist Nawaf Al-Amer of the Sanad news agency. In November, a further three journalists were arrested, including Ameer Abo Iram of the Ramallah-based news outlet Al-Ersal, Mohamad Al-Atrash, a host of Radio Alam, and Amer Abu Arafa, a freelance reporter for the Quds News Network and Shehab News Agency.

In October 2024, American journalist Jeremy Loffredo was arrested by the Israeli military for reporting on where Iranian missiles had landed in Israel and charged with "aiding the enemy".

Israeli police arrested and detained Israeli Haredi journalist Israel Frey July 2025 after the office of the State Attorney of Israel accused him of "inciting terrorism." The same month, Nasser Laham, Palestinian journalist and editor-in-chief of Ma'an News Agency, was also arrested on allegations of "assisting a terror organization through media".

==== Allegations of sexual violence against journalists in Israeli detention ====
The Committee to Protect Journalists found that, of 59 Palestinian journalists who had been released by Israeli authorities since the October 7 attacks, "three percent said they had been raped, and 29 percent said they had endured other forms of sexual violence."

In "The Silence That Meets the Rape of Palestinians" in The New York Times, Nicholas Kristof also shared the testimony of a Gaza journalist detained in 2024 who said he had been raped by a dog while blindfolded, handcuffed, and stripped naked.

=== Intimidation and violence by Hamas ===
Gazan journalists have reported facing intimidation, threats, and physical assaults by Hamas security forces when attempting to cover anti-Hamas protests and other sensitive topics during the Gaza war. According to the committee to Protect Journalists, violations of press freedom include phone threats, interrogations, beatings, arrests, and surveillance, with journalists being warned against covering demonstrations or accused of spying. The Palestinian Journalists' Syndicate confirmed these "major violations", and noted many incidents go unreported due to fear of retaliation as journalists practice self-censorship to continue working.

=== Threats, cyberattacks and censorship ===
Various threats have also been made towards journalists over the phone, or by Israeli soldiers and police at borders and checkpoints. In October, an RT Arabic crew was stopped by Israeli police and warned that they would risk arrest if they returned to the location. On 5 November, a team of journalists from the German broadcaster ARD, including Jan-Christoph Kitzler, were stopped by Israeli soldiers to the south of Hebron and threatened with weapons. They were also questioned about whether they were Jewish, according to the German news service Tagesschau and Haaretz, with one team member being called a traitor. Kitzler attributed the aggression to the reporting by the team on Israeli settler violence against Palestinians, writing on X that "it's noteworthy that many of the soldiers in that area are settlers themselves, creating an environment where journalists are generally unwelcome."

Media teams operation in the region have also been exposed to various kinds of cyberattack, with the Jerusalem Post website going down on 9 October, with Anonymous Sudan claiming responsibility. The Palestinian Authority news agency Wafa also experienced a cyberattack on 18 October, as did Al Jazeera English on 31 October and Al-Mamlaka TV on 3 November.

Since the conflict began, the Israeli authorities have also ordered the shutting down of several media outlet, including the West Bank-based J-Media agency and the Hebron-based Dream radio station. Israel has also propose emergency regulations to halt media broadcasts that harm "national morale", and threatened to close Al-Jazeera's local offices and block the outlet from freely reporting. On 30 October 30, Rolling Stone said its journalist Jesse Rosenfeld had been denied press credentials by the Israeli government after having covered the Benjamin Netanyahu's administration critically.

Allegations were raised in early November 2023 that the IDF had foiled a number of catfishing or honeypot scams on social media with the majority clustered on Instagram. Multiple accounts reportedly aligned with Iran had made contact with IDF troops and worked to gain the troops trust before asking for potentially sensitive information. The IDF did not comment on if the scams had produced any actionable intelligence for Hamas.

In September 2024, the National Writers Union released a report stating that they had documented 44 instances of retaliation against 100 journalists in North America and Europe who were perceived to be sympathetic toward Palestinians.

October 13, 2025, Gabriele Nunziati was fired from Agenzia Nova after addressing a question to Paula Pinho, chief spokesperson of the European Commission of the European Union:

You’ve been repeating several times that Russia should pay for the reconstruction of Ukraine. Do you believe that Israel should pay for the reconstruction of Gaza since they have destroyed almost all its civilian infrastructure?

=== Suspension of Muslim journalists by MSNBC ===
During the war, there was an incident involving the suspension of three Muslim journalists from MSNBC: Mehdi Hasan, Ayman Mohieddine, and Ali Velshi. The network's decision coincided with escalating tensions in the Gaza Strip. Hasan's show on Peacock, Mohieddine's scheduled appearances and Velshi's anchoring duties were all affected. Despite the changes, MSNBC maintained that these were coincidental and not indicative of any sidelining. The incident sparked a debate about potential religious bias, with critics suggesting that the anchors were targeted based on their faith.

=== Firing of Antoinette Lattouf by ABC ===
Antoinette Lattouf, an Australian journalist at the Australian Broadcasting Corporation was fired after posting a Human Rights Watch report on her social media account. The firing sparked a hearing by the Fair Work Commission. Staff at ABC threatened to go on strike in opposition to Lattouf's firing. Reporting by the Sydney Morning Herald showed a group of pro-Israeli lobbyists had actively campaigned for Lattouf's removal. On 20 February, ABC stated it had rejected a freedom of information request regarding complaints made by staff members. On 20 March, the Media, Entertainment and Arts Alliance called for the dismissal of ABC's Managing Director David Anderson for his role in firing Lattouf.

=== Los Angeles Times partial ban on Gaza reporting ===
In response to around 36 to 38 of its journalists signing the 9 November 2023 statement, "We condemn Israel's killing of journalists in Gaza and urge integrity in Western media coverage of Israel's atrocities against Palestinians", the Los Angeles Times banned them from reporting on the war in Gaza for three months. Suhauna Hussein, one of the journalists, stated, "Yes it's true we've been taken off cover[a]ge, which in effect removes a great many Muslim journalists and most [if] not all Palestinians at the LA Times from coverage". Altogether, over 600 journalists signed the statement. Los Angeles Times management announced the ban in mid-November, stating that the journalists' statement violated the newspaper's ethics policy. The ban affected an ongoing project at the newspaper, the "Gaza Voices Project", in which Palestinians wrote their own obituaries for use in case they were killed, in that several journalists with linguistic, cultural and contextual knowledge were blocked from contributing. One journalist described the ban as having a chilling effect.

=== Censorship of social media content ===
Major social media platforms such as Facebook, Instagram, YouTube, and TikTok have been accused of censoring or limiting the reach of pro-Palestine voices during Israel's war. Users have said they were subjected to practices such as shadowbanning, where content is hidden or its reach reduced when using certain keywords or hashtags like "FreePalestine" or "IStandWithPalestine". Instagram has also been accused of taking down posts mentioning Palestine, an issue that Meta has attributed to a bug. Instagram's "see translation" feature erroneously added the word "terrorist" to some Palestinian users' bios; the issue was later fixed and Meta issued an apology.

==== Meta ====
According to a December 2023 Human Rights Watch report, Meta has engaged in "systemic censorship of Palestine content on Instagram and Facebook." During the Gaza war, Jordana Cutler, formerly an advisor to Benjamin Netanyahu and senior Israeli government official, held the position of Director of Public Policy for Israel and the Jewish Diaspora at Meta. Such a role is unusual at Meta, and there is no counterpart representing Palestinian users. According to The Intercept, Cutler has in this position invoked Meta's 'Dangerous Organizations and Individuals' policy—which prevents Facebook and Instagram users from discussing any of thousands of undisclosed blacklisted entities—to flag posts and content contrary to Israeli foreign policy interests for removal. Among these were posts by Students for Justice in Palestine.

According to Drop Site News, Israel is "the biggest originator of takedown requests globally," and, since October 7, 2023, Meta has complied with 94% of the content takedown requests it has issued—which the news site says "can be called the largest mass censorship operation in modern history."

Some people who posted in support of Palestine or the civilians impacted by the bombing campaign in Gaza claimed that they were purposefully censored or their posts were restricted from being seen by a broader audience. Thousands of pro-Palestinian supporters claimed that Facebook and Instagram suppressed or removed posts that did not break the platforms' rules. One user on Instagram reported that her Instagram Stories posts about developments in Palestine received fewer views and did not appear on her friends' accounts, her user name became unsearchable and friends were unable to interact with her posts. The user's report was one of hundreds according to social media watchdog group 7amleh, the Arab Center for Social Media Advancement, who stated that social media websites shadow banned content related to the conflict. A similar trend was seen during May 2021 where there was a series of escalations in Palestine.

==== ByteDance ====
In mid-October 2023, the Communications and digital minister Fahmi Fadzil confirmed that the Malaysian Communications and Multimedia Commission (MCMC) would meet with TikTok's parent company ByteDance following complaints from Malaysian TikTok users that content containing words like Hamas were removed by the social media company.

Suspension of social media accounts

Meta, Facebook's parent company, suspended the Palestinian Quds News Network (QNN), the largest Palestinian news page on its platform. QNN, which had both Arabic and English news pages and 10 million followers, reported on the conflict between Israel and the Gaza Strip. The network criticized the suspension as a violation of freedom of opinion and expression and claimed it was in alignment with the Israeli government.

On 13 October, Meta restricted access to the Instagram account of photojournalist and influencer Motaz Azaiza after he shared footage of the aftermath of an Israeli bombardment that killed 15 of his family members. Access was restored on 14 October.

On 25 October 2023, Meta's Instagram suspended "eye.on.palestine" a pro-Palestinian Instagram account that was a key source of news on Gaza which documented daily Israeli abuses and violations in the occupied West Bank and the besieged Gaza Strip during the Israeli aggression. This led to huge anger and a backlash from activists and media personnel online. The page resumed activities on 27 October after the team discussed the issues with Meta.

=== Closure of Al Jazeera by Israel ===
On October 15, 2023, Israel's Communications minister Shlomo Karhi said he was seeking the closure of Al Jazeera's bureau in Israel, adding at the time that the proposal was being analysed by Israeli security officials and legal experts. The Committee to Protect Journalists (CPJ) condemned the proposed shutdown, saying, "plurality of media voices is essential in order to hold power to account, especially in times of war."

Israel's government, however, left Al Jazeera out of a decision about emergency media regulations set for the conflict that included the shutdown of Lebanese channel Al Mayadeen and the seizure of its equipment in November 2023. Then-Israeli Foreign minister Eli Cohen said he was still in favor of a crackdown against Al Jazeera.

On April 1, 2024, Israel's parliament passed a bill authorizing the Prime Minister of Israel to shut down foreign channels who were considered threats to national security, including Al Jazeera. White House spokesperson Karine Jean-Pierre said the bill was "concerning." Al Jazeera released a statement saying, "This latest measure comes as part of a series of systematic Israeli attacks to silence Al Jazeera". Reporters Without Borders stated, "Israel is using every possible method to try to silence Al Jazeera for its coverage of the reality of the fate of Palestinians". The chair of the Committee to Protect Journalists stated, "It’s another example of the tightening of the free press and the stranglehold the Israeli government would like to exercise. It’s an incredibly worrying move by the government." In a statement, PEN America said, "The Israeli government must reverse this decision immediately, stop using sweeping laws to clamp down on the media".

On May 5, 2024, Israel's Prime Minister cabinet voted unanimously to permanently shut Al Jazeera's office in the country and authorized the seizure of its equipment. On the same day, all Al Jazeera broadcasts (in English and in Arabic) went off air in Israel. In response to the news, the Foreign Press Association stated Israel had joined "a dubious club of authoritarian governments" by banning the network. The deputy general secretary of the International Federation of Journalists stated, "Closing down media, closing down television stations is a sort of thing that despots do". The UN Secretary-General spokesperson Stéphane Dujarric condemned the network's closure. On 23 May, Israeli forces opened fire at an Al Jazeera crew in Jenin. In July 2024, an Israeli court extended the Al Jazeera ban for another month.

In September 2024, the Israeli military raided Al Jazeera's office in the occupied West Bank, shutting it down. Journalists present during the raid stated the Israeli military destroyed their equipment and pointed weapons at them if they tried to move. The Foreign Press Association stated it was "deeply troubled" by the raid, saying, "Restricting foreign reporters and closing news channels signals a shift away from democratic values". The director of the International Federation of Journalists stated, "This is the worst possible behaviour from a country that claims to be a defender of free speech. It’s clear evidence of a determined policy to quell any kind of criticism." The committee to Protect Journalists stated, "Israel’s efforts to censor Al Jazeera severely undermine the public’s right to information on a war that has upended so many lives in the region".

=== Confiscation of equipment and removal of Associated Press content by Israel ===
In May 2024, Israeli authorities raided the office of American news agency Associated Press, and verbally ordered it to remove a live news video showing Gaza which the Associated Press refused to do.

Following such refusal, Israel conficasted a camera and a broadcasting equipment from Associated Press citing the agency allegedly violated the new foreign media law for selling images to Al Jazeera, who was already banned under said law.

U.S. officials reached out to Israeli counterparts on May 21 to express concern over the seizure, which was hours later reversed, with the equipment being returned to the Associated Press.

== Impact of misinformation ==
Misinformation and propaganda have presented a notable problem during the conflict. False information and deceptive content have circulated extensively, especially in countries such as Indonesia. This has raised worries about the possibility of misinformation escalating tensions and playing a role in fueling the conflict. Media reporters relied on OSINT information for their coverage of the war, contributing to the spread of misinformation.

Mainstream media extensively reported on the conflict, emphasizing the human toll and challenges faced by journalists and news platforms. However, distinguishing fact from fiction proved difficult due to the conflict's intricacies.

=== Reliability of military claims ===
During the Gaza war, Israel has released several pieces of incorrect or disputed information, leading to questions about its credibility. On claims linking Palestinian militants to sexual assaults on Oct 7, The Times has remarked that investigations have been hampered by "false and misleading information" spread by "senior [Israeli] political figures and government-linked civil activists". A UN report on these allegations has stated that Israeli authorities have been unable to produce the evidence politicians said existed.

Writing for openDemocracy, British academic Paul Rogers stated, "Israel must maintain the pretence of an orderly war with few civilians killed. Netanyahu's government is lying, but it would be naive to expect otherwise. Lying is what many powerful states routinely do, particularly in wartime." In The Intercept, investigative journalist Jeremy Scahill wrote, "At the center of Israel's information warfare campaign is a tactical mission to dehumanize Palestinians and to flood the public discourse with a stream of false, unsubstantiated, and unverifiable allegations."

Some organizations, including the Palestinian Journalists' Syndicate and staff at CNN, have criticized Western media outlets for repeating "Israeli military propaganda" without proper journalistic interrogation. In March 2024, journalist Mehdi Hasan announced he was starting a series debunking Israeli misinformation used during the war, stating, "Israeli officials have told so many lies since October 7 with so little pushback from the media that it’s hard to keep up."

=== Social media and misinformation ===
A group of experts and journalists said to Al Jazeera that the systemic "bias in favor of Israel" is "irreparably damaging" the credibility of news agencies considered "mainstream" in the eyes of Arabs and others.

Journalist Janine Zacharia stated in relation to the war that online social media encourage the spread of "hot takes" and make the rapid dissemination of false information easy. She argued in favour of mainstream media, stating that "legitimate credible fact-based news organization[s]" differ from fake news producers in that the "legitimate" media admit their errors. Zacharia said that longer articles about the war "must mention" the 2005 Israeli disengagement from Gaza, the 2006 Palestinian legislative election won by Hamas, and the 2006–2007 Fatah–Hamas conflict.

== Controversies ==
=== "Screams Without Words" ===
In February 2024, Anat Schwartz, one of the authors of a New York Times article about sexual violence on 7 October, was found to have liked incendiary posts on social media calling to turn Gaza into a "slaughterhouse". This came after heavy criticism about the quality of the article's reporting. The publication of the article was followed by internal worries about the strength of its reporting. As an Intercept report criticizing the article stated that these worries caused an episode of The Daily podcast about the report to be set aside, which the management treated as a newsroom leak, an internal investigation into the leak began, lasting multiple weeks. This caused tensions with the New York Times Guild (the paper's union, which is represented by NewsGuild-CWA) and dissention within the organization. The union alleged that the investigators have been especially interested in employees of Middle Eastern or North African ethnic origin—and that they have been poring over the membership and communications of an affinity group of these employees—characterizing this as "racially motivated" activity; NYT denied this. Summarizing the controversy, Al Jazeera stated that the claims in "Screams Without Words" "have since been revealed to be unsubstantiated, demonstrating the Times' pro-Israeli/anti-Palestinian bias and leaving the paper's newsroom riven by dissent."

=== The Wall Street Journal ===
On January 29, The Wall Street Journal reported the key claims that the dossier made. Palestinian-Canadian rights lawyer Diana Buttu opined that the "problem with these types of allegations is that they adopt the Israeli narrative without questioning or second-guessing it." Al Jazeera further characterized the article as a "journalistic failure", noting that the authors did not fact check Israeli claims that one in 10 of UNRWA's staff members had "links to (Hamas or other) militants" or even specify what "links" meant.

In commentary for The Intercept, Jeremy Scahill criticized the article as it:

- "read to him… like an Israeli government press release filled with unsubstantiated allegations" which was then "passed off as an article" in one of American's leading newspapers and given the paper's influence, circulated "like wildfire" and was used to pressure more governments to cut funding to UNRWA
- accused 10% of UNRWA staff of having "links" to terrorists, but did not "even" explain what is meant by "links"
- failed to mention that Hamas is Gaza's government, "not just the Qassam brigades", and that ties to Hamas are thus not the "smoking gun" that the Journal "portrayed them to be"

=== Honest Reporting ===
On 8 November, Honest Reporting, a pro-Israel media watchdog group, reported that several Gaza-based journalists, including those working with AP and Reuters, "appeared to have been embedded with Hamas" during the 2023 Hamas attack on Israel in violation of journalism ethics. Israeli government officials subsequently said that the journalists had prior knowledge of the attack. (Note: Israeli communications minister Shlomo Karhi alleged the journalists had advance knowledge of the attack, while Likud MK Danny Danon said they would be added to the "hit list". Prime Minister Benjamin Netanyahu's office wrote on X: "These journalists were accomplices in crimes against humanity; their actions were contrary to professional ethics.") CNN and AP ended their relationship with one of these photographers, Hassan Eslaiah. Within a week, Honest Reporting said that that Reuters, the Associated Press, CNN, and The New York Times had no prior knowledge of the attacks. Reuters noted that it was "deeply concerned about the irresponsibility of Honest Reporting in publishing such damaging accusations."

=== Ulf Kristersson ===
During a Q&A session on November 21, 2023, Swedish prime minister Ulf Kristersson said, in Swedish, "Israel has the right to folk" before interrupting himself and saying "to defense within the framework of folkrätten [international law]". Accusations that he had intended to use the word folkmord (genocide) circulated online. The incident was covered by outlets such as TRT World and RT DE. Palestinian news agency Wafa reported that Kristersson "says Israel has the right to commit genocide before correcting himself to say the right to self-defense", while other media such as Pakistani newspaper Dawn and Middle East Eye used more cautious language.

Mattias Heldner, head of the linguistics department at Stockholm University, pointed out that the sentence structure of Kristersson's speech led up to the words "to defense" rather than "genocide", noting that he had not said "to commit" prior to saying the disputed word.

=== Associated Press ===
In February 2024, survivors and victim relatives of the Nova music festival massacre filed a lawsuit in Florida against Associated Press, alleging four freelance photojournalists were embedded with militants who overran southern communities on October 7. The Associated Press was ordered by a judge to release redacted documents related to the case to the public. In December 2024, US District Judge K. Michael Moore dismissed the lawsuit. The court ruled that the plaintiffs' allegations were insufficient to establish that the Associated Press had a financial relationship with Hamas or possessed advance knowledge of the October 7 attacks. Judge Moore concluded that purchasing photographs from independent freelance creators constituted an arm's-length commercial transaction rather than material support or active participation in the event.

=== BBC bias ===
The BBC has been accused of bias due to describing militants as journalists in its coverage. The Telegraph reported that 53 individuals mentioned as journalists were involved in combat, some of them participating in the October 7 attacks. The BBC said in response that the list included journalists regardless of the political affiliation of the media outlet they worked for and that they were looking into the report in light of the new information that surfaced.

== See also ==
- History of Palestinian journalism
- How to Sell a Genocide
- International reactions to the Gaza war
- Israeli public diplomacy in the Gaza war
- Media coverage of the Israeli–Palestinian conflict
- Outline of the Gaza war
- Protest paradigm in media coverage of Gaza war protests
