= Transatel =

French telecom corporation

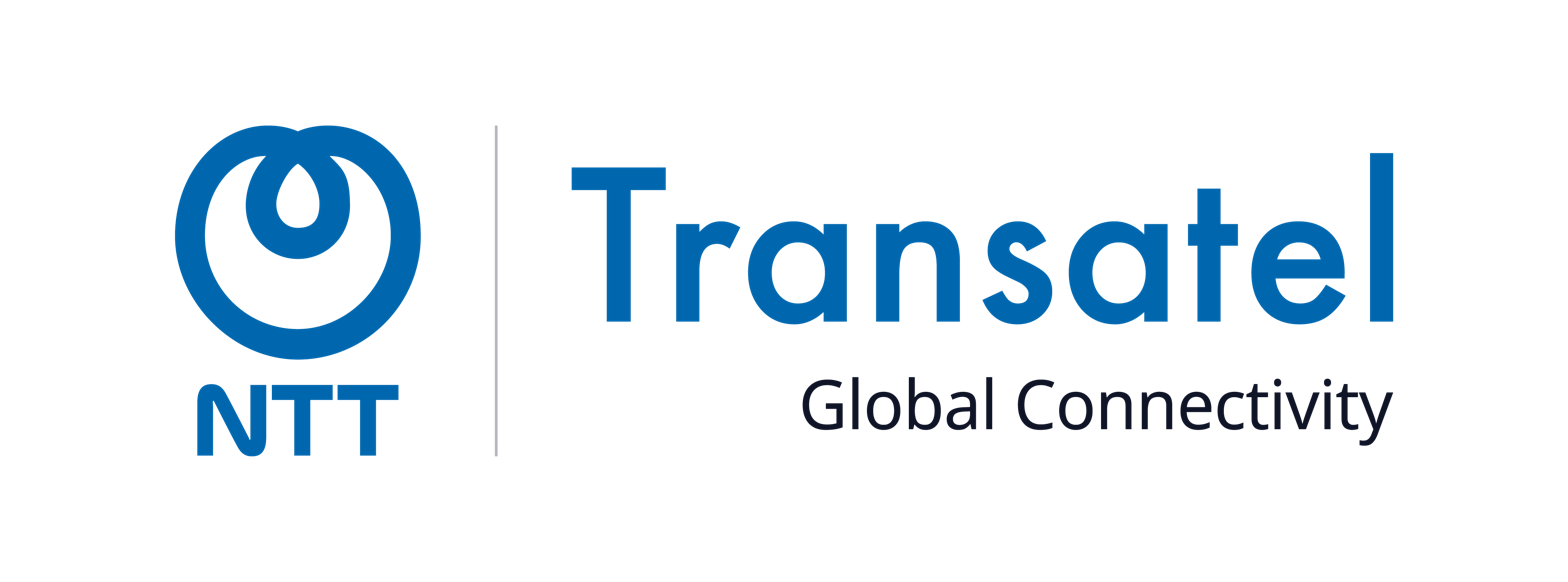
- Type: Public limited company (Société Anonyme)
- Industry: Telecommunications
- Founded: 2000
- Founders: Jacques Bonifay - CEO; Bertrand Salomon - Deputy CEO
- Headquarters: La Défense Cedex, France
- Key people: Jacques Bonifay - CEO; Bertrand Salomon - Deputy CEO
- Products: Cellular connectivity; Internet of Things (IoT); Branded mobile services; MVNO / MVNE / MVNA
- Number of employees: 350 (2025)
- Parent: NTT DATA
- Website: www.transatel.com

Transatel is a telecommunications company providing cellular connectivity solutions for both businesses and consumers.

Founded in 2000, the company is led by its co-founders Jacques Bonifay (CEO) and Bertrand Salomon (Deputy CEO). Since 2019, Transatel has been a subsidiary of the NTT Group.

Based in France, Transatel also has subsidiaries in the United Kingdom, Switzerland, Singapore, Argentina, Brazil, and the United States.

== Activities ==
=== Internet of Things ===
As a Mobile Virtual Network Operator (MVNO), Transatel provides global cellular connectivity services for M2M (machine-to-machine) and IoT (Internet of Things) applications across the automotive and connected industry sectors, including aviation, transportation, energy, agriculture, and healthcare. Its ITU-assigned network code 901-37, combined with roaming agreements with over 300 mobile and satellite operators, enables coverage in more than 200 countries and territories.

Transatel’s client portfolio includes BMW, Airbus, Worldline, Cisco, Stellantis (formerly FCA), and Toyota.

=== Expansion of Private Cellular Networks ===
In 2021, Transatel introduced a technology that allows SIM cards to connect to both private enterprise 4G and 5G networks and public mobile operator networks. This innovation won multiple awards, including the IoT Awards 2021 (Ambitious Project) and the IoT Breakthrough Awards 2021 (Public Safety Solution of the Year). The solution was deployed by Toulouse Metropole during the Rugby World Cup to ensure connectivity for emergency services.

=== Branded mobile services ===
As a MVNA / MVNE (Mobile Virtual Network Aggregator / Enabler), Transatel provides a platform that allows businesses and operators to resell mobile services under a white-label model. Since its establishment, Transatel has enabled more than 250 mobile virtual network operators (MVNOs) in France (on the Orange network), Switzerland, Belgium, and the United Kingdom (on the BT network), including Ecotalk, China Telecom, Mozillion, Mega, and many others.

In addition to wholesale activities, Transatel has operated several retail brands:

- Transatel Mobile (2001–2019)
- Euro Keitai (2005–2015)
- Le French Mobile (2010–2014)
- Transatel DataSIM (2015–2025)
- Bitebird with Air France–KLM (2016)
- Ubigi (2017)

Transatel is a founding member of MVNO Europe and of the Alternative Télécom association, where Jacques Bonifay serves as President and Vice-President, respectively.

=== Ubigi ===
In 2017, Transatel introduced Ubigi as a brand providing international eSIM mobile plans for smartphones, tablets, and laptops. The service has been made available through partnerships with Apple, Android, Microsoft, Fujitsu, Dell, Toshiba, Vaio, Asus, Acer, and Lenovo.

Ubigi has also been adopted by automotive manufacturers including Jaguar Land Rover, Fiat Chrysler Automobiles (Fiat, Maserati, Alfa Romeo, Jeep), BMW, and MINI to deliver in-car connectivity for their customers. In 2023, the service was extended to enterprises under the name Ubigi for Business.

Numerous competitors are active in this eSIM market, such as Airalo, Saily, Holafly, or the French company Kolet.

== Key Dates ==
- 2000 – Creation of the company
- 2001 – Launch of Transatel Mobile
- 2004 – Launch of MVNE activity in France and Belgium
- 2005 – Launch of Euro Keitai
- 2007 – Launch of MVNA activity in France (with Bouygues)
- 2008 – Launch of MVNE activity in the UK and Switzerland (with Orange)
- 2009 – Launch of MVNA activity in the United Kingdom (BT)
- 2010 – Launch of French Mobile
- 2011 – Launch of Machine-to-Machine (M2M) activity
- 2014 – Assignment of code 901 37 by the ITU
- 2014 – Launch of IoT activity
- 2015 – Launch of Transatel Data SIM
- 2016 – Launch of Bitebird (with Air France)
- 2017 – Launch of Ubigi
- 2019 – Acquisition by NTT Group
- 2023 – Launch of Ubigi for Business
- 2024 – Opening of Transatel Brazil subsidiary

== Key Clients ==
- Airbus
- BMW Group
- Toyota
- Stellantis
- Jaguar Land Rover
- Worldline
- Air France
- On-Off

== Key Partners ==
- BT
- Capestone
- Cisco
- Fortinet
- Giesecke+Devrient
- Microsoft
- NXP
- O2 Telefónica
- OQ Technology
- Orange
- Sateliot
- Skylo
- Steliau Technology
- Stellar
- TD-SYNNEX
- Thales
- UNSEENLABS and EUROCONSULT
- Valeo
- VMware

== Professional Associations ==
- GSMA
- ITU
- EENA
- MVNO Europe
- Alternative Télécom
- ECTA
- EUWENA

== Awards and recognition ==
- 2025 Finalist, Best Network for Business, Mobile News Awards
- 2024 Winner, Utmost connected SIM, IoT Global Awards
- 2023 Consumers’ Champion, MVNO of the Year Awards
- 2021 Public Safety Solution of the Year, IoT Breakthrough Awards
- 2021 Projet « Ambitieux », IoT Awards
- 2020 Grand Prize, BearingPoint IoT Business Hub
- 2020 Project « Compliant » with LEDGER, IoT Awards
- 2018 Best M2M/IoT MVNO Solution, MVNO World Congress
- 2017 Best M2M/IoT MVNO Solution, MVNO World Congress
- 2017 Best MVNO Provider, Mobile Industry Awards
- 2016 Best MVNA, MVNO World Congress
- 2015 Best MVNA, MVNO World Congress
- 2014 Best MVNA, MVNO World Congress
- 2013 Best MVNA, MVNO World Congress

== Management ==
=== Jacques Bonifay ===
Jacques Bonifay is President and Co-Founder of Transatel, established in 2000.

Since 2012, he has also served as President of MVNO Europe, an association bringing together leading European Mobile Virtual Network Operators. In this role, he oversees lobbying initiatives with the European Parliament, the Directorate-General for Competition (DG COMP), and the Directorate-General for Communications Networks, Content and Technology (DG Connect).

In 2009, Bonifay was elected President of Alternative Télécom (formerly Alternative Mobile). He currently serves as Vice-President responsible for the Mobile Division. In this capacity, he represents the interests of alternative operators before the French Government, Parliament, ARCEP, and the Competition Authority.

He holds an MBA from INSEAD and an engineering degree from ENSERG/INPG in Grenoble, France. He began his career at the Matra Group (now Airbus) as an engineer and later as Sales Manager for space equipment, before joining McKinsey & Company as a Senior Consultant. He subsequently led the Strategy & Business Development activities of the Professional & Consumer division at Alcatel.

In 2000, Bonifay co-founded Transatel with Bertrand Salomon. Between 2000 and 2007, they carried out several capital increases, as well as multiple share buyback operations between 2012 and 2016. In 2019, Bonifay and Salomon completed the sale of Transatel to the Japanese group NTT.
