= Nomad (eSIM) =

American telecommunications company

- Type: Private
- Industry: App, Telecommunications
- Founded: 2020; 6 years ago
- Founder: Sam Gadodia, Terry Guo, and Shao Xia
- Headquarters: United States of America
- Area served: Worldwide
- Products: Mobile Data Plans, eSIM
- Owner: LotusFlare
- Website: www.nomadesim.com

Nomad eSIM is a telecommunications service headquartered in Santa Clara, California. It was launched in 2020 as part of LotusFlare, Inc., a software company specializing in telecommunications infrastructure. Nomad provides embedded SIM (eSIM) data services for international travelers and enterprise clients, with coverage in over 200 destinations worldwide.

== History ==
Nomad was launched in 2020 and is a business line of LotusFlare, Inc., a telecommunications software development company founded by former Facebook and Microsoft engineers.

Nomad allows international travelers with eSIM-capable smartphones to buy data plans from local providers, reducing roaming costs. eSIMs can be purchased through the website or the smartphone app.

Plans include global eSIMs covering most countries and regional plans for specific areas such as Europe, Asia-Pacific, and Oceania. These plans cater to both short-term trips and extended stays.

It is a data-only service, meaning it does not support traditional cellular voice calls or SMS messaging, but the speeds are fast enough to handle voice and video chat via apps like FaceTime or WhatsApp.

In 2024, the company expanded into enterprise services with the launch of Nomad eSIM Enterprise, a platform enabling businesses to manage employee connectivity across regions. The enterprise offering was expanded in 2025 with the launch of API documentation which allows travel agencies, airlines and other companies to integrate Nomad's eSIM capabilities into their existing services.

== Technology ==
Services are distributed through the Nomad eSIM website and mobile applications, available for iOS and Android devices.

Activation is supported via QR code scanning with end-to-end encryption, or one-click in-app activation. Nomad allows eSIM data sharing across multiple devices such as smartphones, tablets and laptops, and the eSIM can be set to active automatically upon landing in a destination.

In its 2026 study of 50+ travel eSIM providers, the web testing company Ookla reported that Nomad ranked first for download speed (though Nomad itself acknowledged this was based on global median download speeds rather than guaranteed package speeds).

=== Conflict in Gaza ===
Nomad has been used to connect civilians during communication blackouts in the Gaza war zone through remote QR code activation.

== Reviews ==
A 2023 review of the Nomad app in The New York Times noted that the service at the time was mainly designed for technology-inclined users. In 2024, CNBC recognized Nomad as one of the top eSIMs for international travel based on its 24/7 customer support.

In 2026, PCMag named Nomad the best eSIM for short trips and TechRadar ranked it the sixth best eSIM for international travel, based on value for money and its beginner-friendly app.

Nomad currently holds a 4.3/5 review rating on eSIMShortlist, which cites it affordability and broad coverage but notes its short-term package durations. It received a 4.5/5 rating in TechRadar's 2026 review, which cited its affordability against domestic carriers' roaming charges but noted occasional speed issues.

== See also ==
- GigSky
- Airalo
- Holafly
- Yesim
