= Connecting Humanity =

Fundraising collective

- Formation: 2023; 3 years ago
- Founder: Mirna El Helbawi
- Purpose: Providing eSIM
- Location: Cairo, Egypt
- Region served: Gaza Strip
- Services: Connectivity
- Methods: eSIM
- Fields: Telecommunication
- Award: Electronic Frontier Foundation award for Championing Internet Access in Gaza
- Website: connecting-humanity.org

Connecting Humanity (also known as eSIMs for Gaza) is an activist collective which provides internet access to people in Gaza using donated eSIMs, allowing them to connect to networks outside of Gaza. It is run by Mirna El Helbawi, an Egyptian journalist, writer, and activist. Over 200,000 people in Gaza (around 10% of the population) have received internet access through an eSIM.

== Background ==
The Israeli Ministry of Communications has control over the cellular communications and technology Palestinians may build, which has been limited to 2G. Direct attacks on telecommunications infrastructure by Israel, electricity blockades and fuel shortages have caused the near-total collapse of Gaza's largest cell network providers.

Lack of internet access has obstructed Gazan citizens from communicating with loved ones, learning of IDF operations, and identifying both the areas most exposed to bombing and possible escape routes. The blackouts have also impeded emergency services, making it more difficult to locate and access the time-critical injured, and have impeded humanitarian aid agencies and journalists as well.

== First use of eSIMs ==
The Egyptian journalist, writer and activist Mirna El Helbawi discovered that eSIMs (a programmable SIM card built into a smartphone) could be used by people in Gaza to connect to remote telecommunication networks whilst roaming (primarily Egyptian and Israeli networks). The first people she was able to connect by this method were Egyptian journalist Ahmed El-Madhoun and Palestinian journalist Hind Khoudary. The collective currently uses eSIMs from the providers Airalo, Holafly, Nomad, and Simly which are activated by transmissible, one-time QR codes.

== Impact ==
By December 2023, 200,000 Gazans (approximately 10% of the population) had received internet access through an eSIM provided by Connecting Humanity. In 2024 they were recognised by the Electronics Frontier Foundation (EFF) awards for "Championing Internet Access in Gaza".

== See also ==
- Internet in the Palestinian territories
- Outline of the Gaza war
- Timeline of the Israeli–Palestinian conflict in 2023
