= Kolet (company) =

French telecommunications company

- Type: Simplified joint-stock company (SAS)
- Industry: Telecommunications, technology
- Founded: 26 October 2023; 3 years ago
- Founder: Anne-Carole Cöen, Eduardo Ronzano, Jérémy Gotteland and Mehdi Chraibi
- Headquarters: 6 rue d’Armaillé, 75017 Paris, France
- Key people: Chraibi Mohamed-Mehdi (Director and Chief Executive Officer); Ronzano Martinez-Asua Eduardo (President)
- Products: Travel eSIMs
- Number of employees: 30 (2026)
- Website: www.kolet.com

Kolet [kɔlɛt] is a French technology company specializing in global telecommunications.

It provides eSIM (virtual SIM card) solutions for international travelers, allowing them to access the internet without roaming charges from their home provider.

Kolet offers a single eSIM that remains valid indefinitely, rapid installation directly through its mobile application, automatic conversion of unused mobile data into credits, and the option to share a data plan with another person.

The name is pronounced “Ko-lette”, like the French given name Colette, a reference to the French Touch. The name also alludes to the company’s field of activity: it is presented as an exact anagram of “Telco” when the c is replaced with k (both are said to share the letters C, E, K, L, O and T), a common nickname in the telecommunications industry in French.

== History ==
According to Next Content, a research and events company specializing in online consumer behavior, emerging digital practices, and corporate digital strategies across various industries, in a study for the comparison website Liligo.com, 83% of travelers under the age of 40 use the internet while traveling, while 70% keep their phones in airplane mode because connectivity options are prohibitively expensive or because Wi-Fi is unavailable, even though 96% of smartphone owners take their devices on vacation.

Against this background, the startup Kolet was founded on October 26th 2023 by Anne-Carole Cöen, former marketing director of Swile; Eduardo Ronzano, co-founder of KelDoc; Jérémy Gotteland, co-founder of Cajoo, a quick commerce company acquired by Flink in 2022; and Mehdi Chraibi, co-founder of Spades, a restaurant payment service using QR codes. The company was established to address the connectivity challenges faced by travelers abroad.

The Kolet product launched in January 2024.

Kolet aims to compete with major companies in the eSIM sector, such as Saily, Airalo and Holafly.

As for Jérémy Gotteland, he has left the company as of 2025.

In January 2026, Kolet obtained global B Corp certification for its social and environmental commitments, with a score of 99.7 out of a possible 200 points, above the mandatory threshold of 80 points verified by an independent audit.

== Services ==
Kolet allows individual and business users to purchase and activate mobile data plans through an application or website, either before or during a trip.

The startup also offers 1 GB of data as a two-day freemium trial to attract new users.

Its infrastructure is based on eSIM technology, eliminating the need for a physical SIM card.

In 2025, Kolet launched a redesigned version of its mobile application, introducing an intuitive interface, data sharing, and credits for unused gigabytes (GB), with the aim of providing greater flexibility.

In 2026, the startup introduced international VoIP (Voice over Internet Protocol) calls at no additional cost to travelers, following a model similar to Skype.

== General profile of eSIM users ==
The use of mobile internet abroad addresses specific needs that vary by age group, although some common patterns emerge.

Younger generations, such as Generation Z (82% of whom are connected) and Millennials, also known as Generation Y (81%), primarily use mobile internet for entertainment and instant communication, favoring social media, messaging services such as WhatsApp, and streaming services.

By contrast, older generations, particularly Baby boomers (59%) and the Silent Generation (45%), primarily use mobile data for logistical and practical assistance, including GPS navigation applications (Google Maps, Apple Maps, Waze, etc.) and tourist information, such as travel guides and restaurant reviews on services including Google Reviews and Tripadvisor.

== Financial indicators and company growth ==
- Major funding rounds: In 2025, Kolet completed a $10 million Series A funding round (approximately €9 million), led by the investment funds Daphni and 9900 Capital (now BNVT Capital). This followed an initial €5 million seed funding round.
- Institutional support: The company received €1 million in non-dilutive financing from the French public investment bank Bpifrance.
- Notable investors: Prominent figures from the technology and travel industries have invested in Kolet, including Peter Kern (former CEO of Expedia Group) and Jon Gieselman (former vice president of marketing at Apple).

In 2025, Kolet reported that more than 300,000 travelers had used its application and enjoyed their experience and, by the end of 2026, to have surpassed one million travellers.

== Commercial position and partnerships ==
Kolet’s business model relies on a B2B2C distribution strategy. Its technical infrastructure is integrated directly into the booking processes of major travel companies, providing a regular flow of customers without relying solely on advertising expenditure. Its official partners include:

- Airlines: Air France, KLM, Air Caraïbes and French Bee, Transavia France, Philippine Airlines, Virgin Atlantic, Corendon Airlines, Vietnam Airlines and TAAG Angola Airlines.
- Travel agencies and comparison platforms: Kiwi.com, Exoticca, Wego, MakeMyTrip, Enuygun, Evaneos and Omio, Thomas Cook.
- Other passenger transport operators: FlixBus'.
- Travel passes: Turbopass.
- Travel loyalty programs: Club Avolta.
- Insurance: AXA.

For passengers of the Air France/KLM/Transavia group, members of its Flying Blue loyalty program receive exclusive benefits with Kolet, including promotional codes, the ability to earn Flying Blue Miles (loyalty points) when purchasing a Kolet data plan, and the option to pay with Miles.

Members of Etihad Airways’ Etihad Guest loyalty program can also pay for Kolet plans using their loyalty points (Miles) through Etihad GuestPay.

The Maharaja Club program of Air India and the Lotusmiles program of Vietnam Airlines allow members to earn loyalty points (Miles) when purchasing a Kolet data plan.

Kolet offers dedicated co-branded airline and Kolet websites, such as Air France × Kolet and Transavia × Kolet, that enable offers to be applied directly, including special discounts and miles earned on data plan purchases.

Kolet’s service now covers more than 190 countries with prepaid mobile data plans that do not require a long-term commitment, reflecting the global rollout of its solution.
