= Yesim =

Swiss-based provider of eSIM mobile data services

- Type: Private
- Industry: Telecommunications
- Founded: 2019
- Founders: Dmitri Verbovski, Max Pankratov
- Headquarters: Baar, Switzerland
- Area served: Worldwide
- Services: Prepaid eSIM mobile data plans, virtual phone numbers, VPN
- Parent: Genesis Group AG
- Website: yesim.app

Yesim is a Swiss-based provider of eSIM mobile data services for international travellers. Founded in 2019 by Dmitri Verbovski and Max Pankratov and operated by Genesis Group AG, the company provides local, regional and worldwide prepaid data plans through mobile apps for iOS and Android. Its service functions as a connectivity aggregator, provisioning eSIM profiles that attach to networks in multiple countries. The service includes automatic eSIM installation, an optional built-in VPN and virtual phone numbers, plus a B2B dashboard for organisations and travel managers to purchase plans, assign allowances and monitor usage.

== History ==
In early 2019, telecommunications entrepreneurs Dmitri Verbovski and Max Pankratov launched Yesim within Baar-based Genesis Group AG, a telecommunications infrastructure firm specializing in cloud-based IT services. The Yesim app debuted the same year on the Apple App Store and Google Play.

During 2020-2021 the service added multilingual support and expanded functions designed for use by travellers in its consumer app. It subsequently introduced an in-app VPN and optional virtual numbers as optional additional services for cross-border use.

In 2022, D. Verbovski was appointed chair of Genesis Group, while M. Pankratov joined the board of directors. Around this period, the company emphasised a multi-network aggregation model and presented its automatic network-selection logic ("SwitchLess") for roaming scenarios.

By 2024-2025, industry outlets such as Forbes and TechRadar listed Yesim among notable eSIM providers in buyer’s guides for international travel.

In 2025, trade coverage reported that Yesim surpassed one million users amid broader consolidation in the eSIM market and that the company expanded tooling for travel managers and business customers.

== Operations ==
The service aggregates access to multiple networks in each destination and manages connectivity based on signal conditions and availability through its SwitchLess connection logic. This approach is described by the company and industry press as cloud-based and designed for cross-border roaming without physical SIM swaps. In practice, the app provisions local or regional profiles that attach to compatible LTE/5G networks depending on the market.

Yesim provides prepaid eSIM data plans through its mobile app on iOS and Android and through its web interface. Plans range from small data bundles to unlimited packages. The service includes automatic eSIM installation, a built-in VPN, and optional virtual numbers. For B2B use, the company provides a centralised dashboard for organisations and travel managers to purchase plans, assign allowances and monitor usage across teams.

Yesim functions as a mobile connectivity aggregator, working with more than 800 carriers and roaming brokers. For example, users in the United States may be connected via Verizon, AT&T, and T-Mobile, and in Mexico via Telcel and Movistar networks.

== See also ==
- GigSky
- Airalo
- Holafly
