= How to Sell a Genocide =

2026 book by Adam H. Johnson

- Author: Adam H. Johnson
- Language: English
- Published: 2026 (Pluto Press)
- Pages: 256
- ISBN: 0-745-35165-4

How to Sell a Genocide: The Media's Complicity in the Destruction of Gaza is a 2026 book by American media analyst Adam H. Johnson. It examines the US media's coverage of the Gaza war and its role in enabling the Gaza genocide.

== Content ==
How to Sell a Genocide is based on Johnson's analysis of 12,000 articles and 5,000 clips from what he calls "center-left, liberal, legacy or even mainstream media", as well as anonymous interviews with journalists. He analyzed articles published by The New York Times, The Washington Post, USA Today, CNN, Politico, Axios and the Associated Press, and TV segments which aired on CNN and MSNBC. He states in the book's introduction that he did not analyze output from conservative media organizations such as Fox News, The Daily Wire, Sinclair News, or The Wall Street Journal, writing that they are "for the most part, openly genocidal against the Palestinians and make no pretense otherwise."

In the book, Johnson argues that the Gaza genocide was enabled by the establishment American media's coverage of the early months of the Gaza war, which he says "provid[ed] cover for months of a nihilistic campaign of starvation, bombing, arbitrary detention, shooting, and sexual violence." He argues that this coverage was part of a deliberate pattern due to media figures deciding that "defending the powerful and spinning a fictional narrative to soothe Western liberal audiences was more important than speaking plain truths, than defending a dispossessed people from a wholly asymmetric campaign carried out by Israel with the full backing of the US to destroy, in whole or in part, the Palestinians of Gaza."

Johnson said his analysis of mainstream media coverage showed a pattern of pro-Israel bias, including:

- Mentioning the right to self-defense almost exclusively for Israel
- Labeling Palestinian civilian casualties near militants as "human shields" while not mentioning the Israeli military's use of human shields
- Using emotive language such as "massacre", "barbaric", “savage", and "slaughter" significantly more for killings of Israeli civilians than for Palestinian civilians
- Using the "Hamas-run" qualifier for civilian casualty counts provided by the Gaza Health Ministry, despite these figures being used by the US State Department, the World Health Organization and others
- Significantly more coverage of antisemitism during the Gaza war compared to Islamophobia
- Significantly less coverage of the killing of Hind Rajab by IDF soldiers compared to the resignation of Claudine Gay

== Reception ==
Egyptian news website Ahram Online praised How to Sell a Genocide for its analysis of how the Gaza war was covered in American media, including the associated protests, accusations of antisemitism and other controversies. Ahram Online added, "The book is not without shortcomings. Johnson writes as an advocate as much as an analyst. His perspective is explicit, and his moral judgments are rarely concealed. Some readers will view this clarity as a strength. Others may question whether the book occasionally sacrifices nuance for the sake of argument. ... Yet, even readers who disagree with aspects of the book will find it difficult to dismiss its central questions." It concluded, "Whether one agrees with his conclusions or not, How to Sell a Genocide stands as one of the most significant contributions to the debate over media performance during the Gaza war and one of the most searching examinations of journalism's role in modern conflict."

Des Freedman, Professor of Media and Communications at Goldsmiths, University of London, said How to Sell a Genocide "sits alongside other impressive accounts of US media bias on Israel, such as Robin Andersen’s forthcoming Complicit Lens: US Media Coverage of Israel’s Genocide in Gaza, to provide an empirically rich critique of the full horror of the performance of American journalism on Gaza." Jeff Sparrow, a senior lecturer at the Centre for Advancing Journalism in the University of Melbourne, commented, "While no one has yet studied the liberal media in Australia with the rigour applied by Johnson in the US, the available evidence suggests it followed the patterns he describes." He added that double standards regarding media coverage of Israel "foster allegations of a media 'captured' by pro-Israel lobbyists, a claim that can degenerate into antisemitic conspiracism. Johnson's book rests on a much better analysis, one that centres US rather than Israeli power."

=== Removal from Waverley Library ===
In August 2026, How to Sell a Genocide was removed from shelves by the Waverley Library at Bondi Junction in Sydney, Australia. The removal happened after J-Wire reported that a survivor of the 2025 Bondi Beach shooting had complained about its inclusion on Facebook. Guardian Australia was unable to locate the Facebook post in question. The Independent and The Sydney Morning Herald reported the library council had received multiple complaints about the book.

The book's removal was criticized by Jewish Council of Australia executive member Bart Shteinman, and Australia Palestine Advocacy Network president Nasser Mashni. Johnson also criticized the decision, saying:

They seem to be objecting largely based on the title using the word 'genocide'. But 'genocide' is not my word, or my finding. The fact of genocide in Gaza is the overwhelming consensus of the human rights world, and it is a wholly mainstream opinion among those tasked with studying and determining such matters. That it makes some people upset is unfortunate, but reality is often upsetting. This particular reality is especially upsetting … to the parents of the over 20,000 children killed by Israel in Gaza since October 2023. Do Sydney officials plan on removing pro-Israel books from their libraries because it potentially upsets these community members?

The book was later restored to the library following a public campaign and an intervention by the State Library of New South Wales.
