= Apple SIM =

Proprietary subscriber identity module produced by Apple Inc

- Developer: Apple Inc.
- Type: Subscriber identity module
- Website: www.apple.com/ipad/apple-sim/

The Apple SIM is a proprietary subscriber identity module (SIM) produced by Apple Inc. It is included in GPS + Cellular versions of the iPad Air 2 and later, iPad mini 3 and later, and iPad Pro.

The Apple SIM supports wireless services across multiple supported carriers, which can be selected from a user interface within iOS and iPadOS, removing the need to install a SIM provided by the carrier itself. While Apple did not acknowledge the feature whilst presenting the iPad models that ship with Apple SIM, promotional materials on its website discuss the feature as being geared toward users of short-term mobile Internet contracts across multiple carriers.

Carriers supported by Apple SIM include AT&T, Verizon, T-Mobile US, EE, au, GigSky, Truphone, Three, and AlwaysOnline Wireless. Altogether these carriers provide coverage in 100+ countries. However, activating mobile services on AT&T will permanently lock the Apple SIM to AT&T, requiring the purchase of a new Apple SIM in order to use a different carrier.

The Apple SIM is known as a Removable SIM with Remote Provisioning – it is a special SIM card that may be configured with different operator profiles. This is in contrast to an embedded SIM, which is not removable and may also be remotely provisioned. It appears that Apple has begun to include both types of SIM in their newer devices.

As of October 1, 2022, Apple SIM technology is no longer available for activating new cellular data plans on iPad.

== Supported devices ==
=== Embedded Apple SIM ===
The following devices have embedded Apple SIM (except China).

- iPad Pro 12.9-inch (2nd generation) (WiFi + Cellular)
- iPad Pro 10.5-inch (WiFi + Cellular)
- iPad Pro 9.7-inch (WiFi + Cellular)

=== Apple SIM support ===
The following devices support physical Apple SIM cards.

- iPad Pro 11-inch (3rd generation) (WiFi + Cellular)
- iPad Pro 11-inch (2nd-generation) (WiFi + Cellular)
- iPad Pro 11-inch (1st generation) (WiFi + Cellular)
- iPad Pro 12.9-inch (5th generation) (WiFi + Cellular)
- iPad Pro 12.9-inch (4th generation) (WiFi + Cellular)
- iPad Pro 12.9-inch (3rd generation) (WiFi + Cellular)
- iPad Pro 12.9-inch (2nd generation) (WiFi + Cellular)
- iPad Pro 12.9-inch (1st generation) (WiFi + Cellular)
- iPad Pro 10.5-inch (WiFi + Cellular)
- iPad Pro 9.7-inch (WiFi + Cellular)
- iPad (9th generation) (WiFi + Cellular)
- iPad (8th generation) (WiFi + Cellular)
- iPad (7th generation) (WiFi + Cellular)
- iPad (6th generation) (WiFi + Cellular)
- iPad (5th generation) (WiFi + Cellular)
- iPad Air 13-inch (5th generation) (WiFi + Cellular)
- iPad Air 11-inch (5th generation) (WiFi + Cellular)
- iPad Air (5th generation) (WiFi + Cellular)
- iPad Air (4th generation) (WiFi + Cellular)
- iPad Air (3rd generation) (WiFi + Cellular)
- iPad Air 2 (WiFi + Cellular)
- iPad mini (6th generation) (WiFi + Cellular)
- iPad mini (5th generation) (WiFi + Cellular)
- iPad mini 4 (WiFi + Cellular)
- iPad mini 3 (WiFi + Cellular)
