= Antler (venture capital firm) =

Singapore-based venture capital firm

Antler Innovation Pte Ltd
- Company type: Private
- Industry: Venture Capital
- Founded: 2017; 9 years ago
- Founder: Magnus Grimeland; Fridtjof Berge
- Headquarters: Singapore
- Products: Business incubator Startup accelerator
- AUM: US$1 billion (2024)
- Website: www.antler.co

Antler is an early-stage venture capital firm founded in 2017, headquartered in Singapore. The firm is present in over 30 cities and has made over 1,500 investments in early-stage companies.

In 2024, it topped the "Most Active Venture Capital Globally" category in PitchBook's Annual Global League Table, with 443 deals.

== Background ==
In 2017, Magnus Grimeland and Fridtjof Berge founded Antler in Singapore. Grimeland, a graduate of Harvard College previously worked at McKinsey & Company and then worked with Rocket Internet to co-found Zalora Group. Later on, Zalora Group became part of Global Fashion Group where Grimeland became its COO. During his time there, he noticed how technology workers were in jobs that weren't fully using their talents and left them to start their own businesses. Grimeland founded Antler to help such workers.

== Operations and investment approach ==
Antler runs a combined incubator and accelerator program that lasts for several months and has two phases. The Antler "Residency" helps entrepreneurs find co-founders and teams to help develop their business idea, and invests in the startups that are thereby generated. The first program was launched in Singapore in 2018 where 1,400 people applied, 62 were accepted and at the end, 13 companies were selected. Antler has been described as a firm famous for convincing founders to quit their day jobs and enroll in an intensive residency program.

In 2019, Antler launched in Australia with a first Australian funded invested in over 100 early-stage companies. In October 2024, a second fund was launched raising more money than initially targeted despite a challenging environment for fundraising.

While Antler is focused on investing in companies during their early stage phase, in 2021, it stated that it was considering extending to later stages, funding companies up to Series C, and in 2023, Antler raised a $285m fund to invest in later stages.

As of May 2022, Antler has invested in over 1,500 startup companies. One in eight of Antler's investments have failed. Antler has invested in two Unicorns, Airalo and Lovable, and has made several notable exits, with some portfolio companies generating substantial returns.

At the start of 2024, Antler stated it would be increasing investments in more evolved companies.

Investors of Antler include individuals such as Eduardo Saverin and Christen Sveaas as well as institutions such as Canica, Credit Saison, International Finance Corporation, Schroders, Vækstfonden and Phoenix Group.

Antler has offices in Asia-Pacific, Europe and North America. Offices were opened in Nairobi, Kenya and in São Paulo, Brazil in 2019 and 2022 respectively, with recent office openings in 2025 including San Francisco and Lagos.
