= Mirna El Helbawi =

Egyptian journalist and activist (born 1992)

- ميرنا الهلباوي
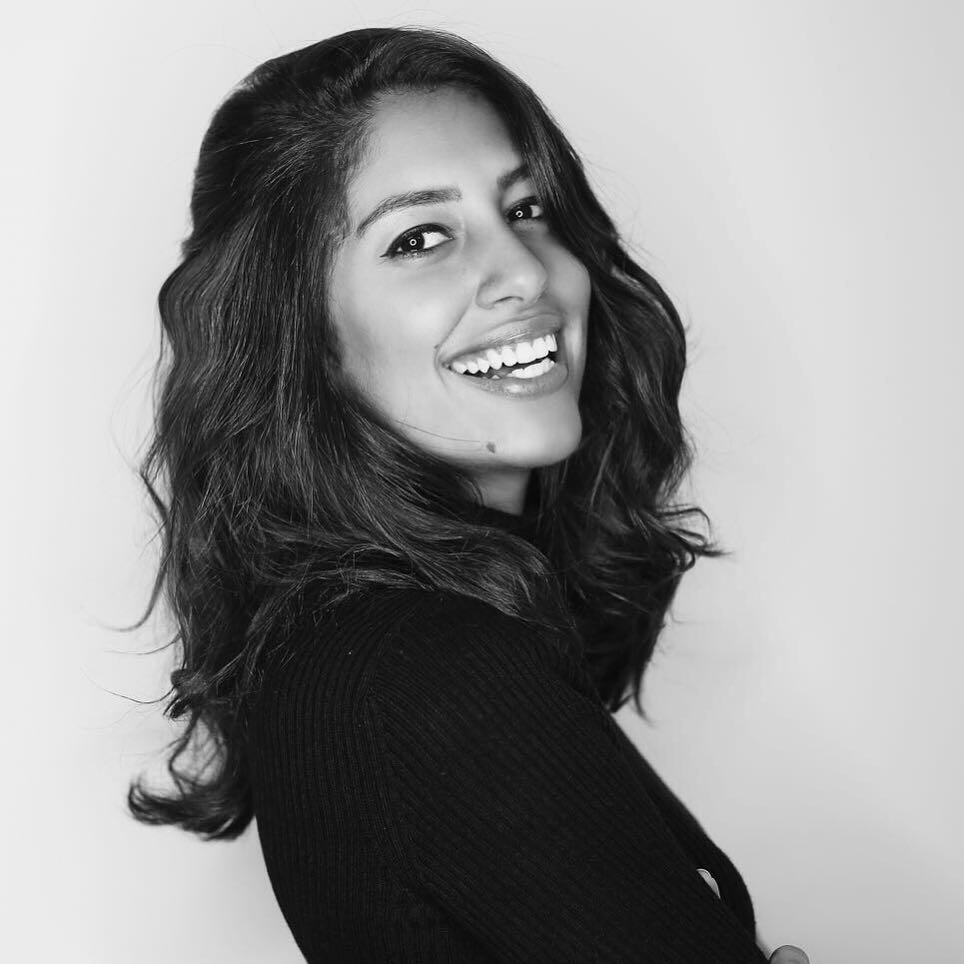
- Born: 1991 or 1992 (age 33–34)
- Occupations: Journalist, writer, podcaster, and activist
- Known for: Connecting Humanity
- Awards: Electronic Frontier Foundation award for 'Championing Internet Access in Gaza'

Mirna El Helbawi (Arabic: ميرنا الهلباوي) is an Egyptian journalist, writer, podcaster and activist. She is the founder of Connecting Humanity, a non-profit organisation that helps people in Gaza to regain access to the internet, using donated eSIMs. She was nominated for the Arab Journalism Award in 2016 and won the Electronic Frontier Foundation award for 'Championing internet access in Gaza' in 2024.

== Connecting Humanity ==
Israeli bombardment, electricity blockades and fuel shortages have caused the near-total collapse of Gaza's largest cell network providers. El Helbawi discovered that eSIMs could be used to reconnect people in Gaza by allowing them to connect to remote cell phone networks in Israel and Egypt. The first two people that she helped get back online through eSIMs were Egyptian journalist Ahmed El-Madhoun and Palestinian journalist Hind Khoudary.

Connecting Humanity claim that, by December 2023, 200,000 people living in Gaza (around 10% of the population) had received internet access through an eSIM. News of the initiative spread quickly through social media, and by December $1.3 million worth of eSIMs were donated to Connecting Humanity. The project is an international effort, with people in countries such as the United States, Switzerland, and Pakistan donating eSIMs. Donors most commonly used Airalo and Simply to generate eSIMs that could then be distributed in Palestine. In 2024 Connecting Humanity was recognised by the Electronics Frontier Foundation awards for 'Championing Internet Access in Gaza'.

== Writing ==
El Helbawi was shortlisted for the Arab Journalism Award in 2016. Her debut novel, Mor Methl Al Qahwa, Helw Methl Al Chocola (Bitter Like Coffee, Sweet Like Chocolate) was published in 2018 followed by her sophomore novel, Kundalini, in 2024. The book is being adapted to the big screen starring Menna Shalaby and Dhafer L'Abidine and directed by Mohamed Salama. She also hosts the podcast Helbing.
