= Nasser Laham =

Palestinian journalist

- Born: 20 July 1966 (age 60); Deheishe refugee camp, Bethlehem, West Bank
- Education: Bethlehem University
- Occupations: Journalist, Director
- Years active: 3 decades
- Awards: Arab Culture Award (2010), Media Journalists for Al-Quds Award, 2020 Personality of the Year Award from Al Sanabel Center

Nasser Laham (born 20 April 1966) is a Palestinian journalist and director, He has had a career spanning over three decades, during which he worked in various mediums, including written, audio, and visual journalism. Laham was previously a communist and an activist during the first Intifada. He endured a six-year imprisonment term in an Israeli jail.

== Early life and education ==
Laham was born on 20 April 1966 in the Deheishe refugee camp located in Bethlehem. Al-Laham's early career in journalism started as the editor-in-chief of Bethlehem TV and Al-Mahd TV while he was studying biology at Bethlehem University. However, he was arrested at an early age, which prompted him to change his major to English literature. Later, he moved to the Faculty of Sociology, from where he graduated. He later earned a doctorate in psychology, which focused on body language.

== Career ==
Al-Laham has worked as an independent journalist and author throughout his career. He has published several books in Arabic and produced several films. He is currently the editor-in-chief of Ma’a News Agency channel, the director of the Lebanese Fields Channel office in Palestine, and a member of the Palestinian National Council.

== Awards ==
Al-Laham has received several accolades, including the Arab Culture Award presented by the Arab League in Qatar in 2010, the Media Journalists for Al-Quds Award, and the 2020 Personality of the Year Award from Al Sanabel Center in Jordan.
