= LotusFlare =

Software development company

- Industry: Telecommunications
- Founded: June 2014; 12 years ago
- Founder: Sam Gadodia; Terry Guo; Shao Xia
- Headquarters: U.S.
- Website: www.lotusflare.com

LotusFlare is a software development company focused on creating products for the telecommunications industry and providing SaaS products to enterprises.

== Background ==
LotusFlare was founded in June 2014 by former Facebook engineers Sam Gadodia, Terry Guo, and Shao Xia.

The company raised a $4 million seed investment from Social Capital, Google Ventures, and Metamorphic Ventures. In September 2015, the company raised a $6 million Series A investment led by Chamath Palihapitiya's firm Social Capital. He is the chairman of the board.

In December 2025, Ericsson acquired a minority stake in the company to integrate LotusFlare's cloud-native DNO Cloud platform into its network application programming interface (API) exposure architecture.

== Products ==
=== Nomad ===
Nomad is a mobile app and website that allows users to purchase eSIM products.

=== Digital Network Operator Cloud (DNO Cloud) ===
DNO Cloud is a cloud-based business support system that is designed to serve telecommunications and media service providers. DNO is based on TM Forum standards, and is Platinum-level certified for a number of its APIs.

==== Users ====
Some notable users of DNO Cloud include:

- Deutsche Telekom
- Globe Telecom
- A1 Telekom Austria Group
- MTN Group
