= Israel Frey =

Israeli left-wing journalist

- ישראל פריי
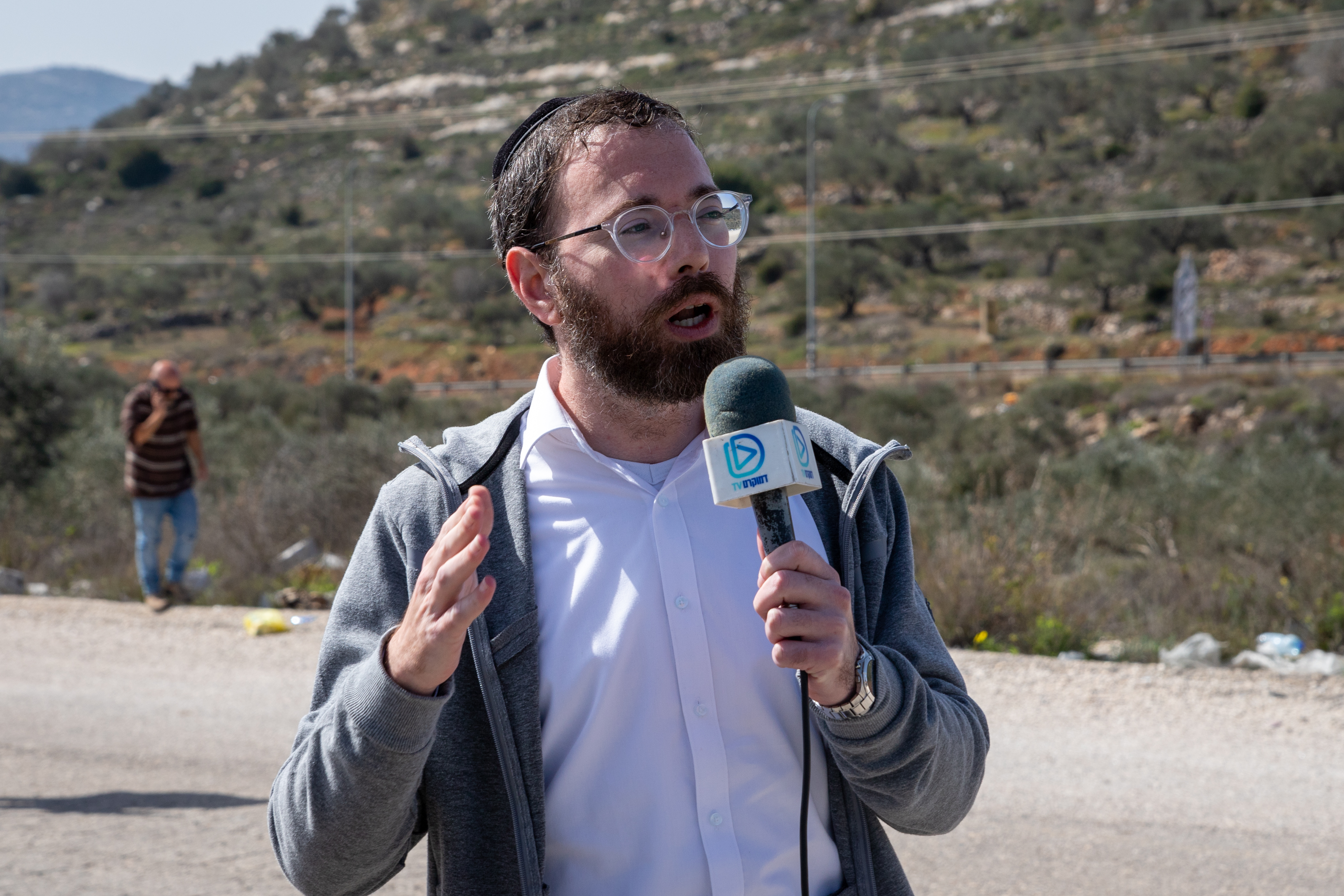
- Born: 1987 (age 38–39)
- Citizenship: Israeli
- Occupation: Journalist
- Relatives: Yehuda Meir Abramowicz (grandfather)
- Website: x.com/freyisrael1

Israel Frey (Hebrew: ישראל פריי) is an Israeli-Haredi journalist. Frey has been critical of the government of Israel and the actions of the Israel Defense Forces (IDF) and has been arrested several times for his tweets. In the beginning of the Gaza war, Frey posted a video of himself praying for Israelis killed in the October 7 attacks and Palestinian civilians killed by the IDF; as a result, his home was attacked by a group of right-wing protesters, and he went into hiding with his wife and children. His political views have been described as left-wing. He has worked for outlets including DemocraTV and Middle East Eye.

== Early life and family ==
Born in 1987, Frey grew up in Tel Aviv, Israel, in the Ger Hasidic community, an ultra-orthodox sect of Judaism. He has two siblings. His grandfather, Yehuda Meir Abramowicz, was a rabbi and a member of the Knesset (MK) for the Agudat Yisrael party. He refused to enlist in the Israel Defense Forces (IDF) as a conscientious objector. He has two children.

== Career ==
Frey began his journalism career working for Haredi outlets, including Radio Kol Chai and Kav Itonut Datit newspapers. One of his tweets sparked controversy when he referred to rabbis as "scum" for supporting Israeli settlers. He was fired under pressure from right-wing activists like Itamar Ben-Gvir. Frey began working at DemocraTV in 2021, an independent station which frequently criticizes Benjamin Netanyahu. During the COVID-19 pandemic, he reported on the lack of observance of COVID prevention rules in the Haredi community. He attributed this nonobservance to the importance of communal events in Haredi traditions and rituals. His work has also appeared in Middle East Eye and Haaretz.

=== Arrest in 2022 ===
Frey tweeted in support of a Palestinian man who had been detained on suspicion of planning an attack in Jaffa in September 2022, praising the man for targeting soldiers instead of attacking civilians. The tweet sparked a backlash, and he was fired by DemocraTV a few months later. According to Frey, DemocraTV demanded that he delete the tweet. DemocraTV leadership countered that Frey was let go because of misconduct, not due to his tweets. In an October 2022 tweet about the killing of an Israeli soldier in East Jerusalem, Frey wrote that attacking Israeli soldiers is not terrorism. Frey was arrested on suspicion of inciting terrorism due to complaints about these two tweets and was released after questioning. His attorney, Gaby Lasky, stated that it was a political arrest meant to scare the Israeli government's critics. Frey said he would not let the Israeli government intimidate him and accused it of fascism. His arrest was criticized by the Union of Journalists in Israel as an attack on the freedom of the press.

=== Attack on his home ===
In the beginning of the Gaza war, Frey posted a video of himself praying the Kaddish for both the Israelis killed in the October 7 attacks and the Palestinian civilians killed by the IDF. He received threatening messages as a result and he was doxxed with his home address shared online. A crowd of right-wing protesters attacked his home in Bnei Brak on the evening of October 14, 2023 with flares and fireworks and attempted to break in. A neighbor convinced the crowd to allow Frey's wife and two children to leave. Frey was evacuated a few hours later with the assistance of the police who, according to him, spit on him and accused him of supporting Hamas. The police escorted him to his car, and he drove away. Upon realizing that he was being followed by some of the protesters, he drove to Ichilov Hospital. He was eventually able to escape with the help of a friend and hospital security and went into hiding.

The police briefly detained one protester outside his home for refusing to leave. They later made a statement denying Frey's claims of misconduct. Israeli MK Ofer Cassif accused the police of delaying their response to the incident because they did not want to protect a leftist journalist. The incident has been cited as an example of backlash against support for peace and Palestinian rights, journalism, and free speech in Israel during the Gaza war.

=== Arrests during the Gaza war ===
In March 2025 Frey tweeted that a Palestinian who attacks Israeli soldiers or settlers should not be considered a terrorist but a hero fighting their oppressor. He was subsequently detained and interrogated on suspicion of inciting terrorism. Upon his release, he condemned the arrest as a "witch hunt" and stated that he "distinguishes between condemnable harm to innocents and resistance to security forces."

Five IDF soldiers, mostly from the Netzah Yehuda Battalion, were killed by IEDs in Beit Hanoun in July 2025. In response, Frey tweeted: "The world is a better place this morning, without five young men who partook in one of the most brutal crimes against humanity. Unfortunately, for the boy in Gaza now being operated on without anesthesia, the girl starving to death and the family huddling in a tent under bombardment — this is not enough." The tweet was criticized by many Israelis, including some peace activists. He was arrested the following day and charged with incitement to terrorism. While in prison, Frey was classified as a security prisoner, a designation typically given to Palestinian prisoners. After his conditional release to house arrest, he pledged to continue criticizing the Gaza war.

Frey regularly attended the Israeli hostage deal protests in Tel Aviv and posted footage of Israeli police detaining protesters.

=== Book ===
In 2026, Frey published Enemy of the People, a memoir. He described the book as "the story of a person who refused to obey social orders, who lost almost everything to maintain the freedom to be himself, and who continues to believe that this land can be made a more just and egalitarian place for all its inhabitants, not just the Jewish ones." A release event was scheduled to be held in a cultural center run by the city of Tel Aviv. In response, Culture Minister Miki Zohar halted government funding for literary events, saying that he would not allow: "An event that echoes support for terror and harm to Israel Defense Forces soldiers".

== Views ==
Frey advocates for equality for everyone who lives in Israel and Palestine. He has been critical of the Israeli government and has advocated for Israelis to refuse to serve in the IDF. Frey asserts that Palestinian attacks on Israeli soldiers are not terrorism, stating that "it’s legitimate for oppressed people to strike at their oppressors". Frey has stated that the Gaza war was caused by Israel's "comprehensive plan to crush" Palestinians and that he supports Palestinian rights because he believes that all humans are equal. He has stated that the full political spectrum of Israeli society, from right to left, is "mobilized" to view Palestinians as ISIS, Nazis, and sub-human. Frey's views are described as left wing by Haaretz, The Jerusalem Post, and The New Yorker.
