= Holafly =

International eSIM provider

- Type: Private company
- Industry: Telecommunications
- Founded: 2017
- Founders: Pedro Máiquez; Yingyan (Lidia) Hu
- Headquarters: Dublin, Madrid
- Area served: Global
- Products: eSIM
- Website: esim.holafly.com

Holafly is a company that provides mobile internet connectivity services to tourists and international travelers. Its main product is the international eSIM. The company was founded by Pedro Máiquez and Yingyan (Lidia) Hu in Spain in 2017.

== History ==
Holafly was founded in Spain, in 2017 by Pedro Máiquez and Yingyan Hu. In its early years, the company sold physical SIM cards for travellers before later shifting towards eSIM-based services.

In 2019, Holafly joined Lanzadera, an accelerator program for entrepreneurial projects. With the help of this program, Holafly expanded its products to include eSIM services in countries such as Germany and France.

In 2022, Holafly launched its eSIM product, which enabled the company to expand internationally.

In 2024, the company launched 'Holafly for Business', a division aimed at selling centralized eSIM management solutions to companies whose employees travel or work internationally.

A company press release, from September 2025, indicated that the company had sold more than 15 million of its eSIMs worldwide.

== eSIM ==
Holafly was an early adopter of eSIM technology and provides unlimited prepaid data and roaming plans to international travelers in more than 200 countries.

The Holafly app, which is available on iOS and Android, helps monitor a user's data usage.

Ritoban Mukherjee, writing in a review for TechRadar, described Holafly's onboarding process as "user-friendly" and its support as "excellent".

In August 2025, Holafly was one of several travel eSIM providers included in an academic study on roaming architectures presented at the USENIX Security Symposium. The study observed that data traffic from some of the eSIMs tested, including Holafly's, could be routed through partner networks in different countries, including China. The report from the study discussed the regulatory implications of this practice in light of Chinese data legislation, such as the 2017 National Intelligence Law and the 2016 Cybersecurity Law.

== See also ==
- GigSky
- Airalo
- Nomad (eSIM)
- Yesim
