= Airalo =

American telecommunications company

AirGSM Pte. Ltd.
- Trade name: Airalo eSIM
- Type: Private
- Industry: Telecommunications, Travel
- Founded: 2019; 7 years ago
- Founders: Ahmet Bahadir Ozdemir; Abraham Burak; Duran Akcaylier
- Headquarters: US
- Area served: Worldwide
- Key people: Ahmet Bahadir Ozdemir (CEO); Abraham Burak(COO)
- Services: eSIM
- Members: Over 20 million
- Number of employees: 200-500 (2025)
- Divisions: partners.airalo.com
- Website: www.airalo.com

Airalo is a telecommunications company founded in 2019 by Ahmet Bahadir Özdemir and Abraham Burak, and sells eSIMs (digital SIM cards). It is headquartered in Delaware, with its operational base in Singapore. As of July 2025, the company reported over 20 million users. Airalo provides eSIM services compatible with mobile networks in most countries, and users can choose between eSIMs for a specific destination, for a region, and at a global level, with various data packages available, including unlimited data eSIMs.

== History ==
Airalo was founded in 2019 by Ahmet Bahadir Ozdemir, a serial entrepreneur, Abraham Burak, a Canadian businessman, and Duran Akcaylier, a web application designer and developer. Duran Akcaylier left the company in 2020.

In July 2025, the company reached 20 million users.

=== Financing ===
In 2019, Airalo secured $1.9 million in seed funding from Antler and Sequoia Capital.

In October 2021, it secured $5 million in Series A financing.

In July 2023, it received $60 million in a Series B financing round led by e& Capital, the venture arm of e&, with participation from Antler Elevate, Liberty Global, Rakuten Capital, Singtel Innov8, Surge, Orange, T Capital (the venture arm of Deutsche Telekom), KPN Ventures, Telefónica Ventures, and I2BF Global Ventures. At that time, it had 5.1 million customers.

In July 2025, it received $220 million in Series C financing round led by CVC (through its CVC Asia Fund VI), with participation from existing investors Peak XV and Antler Elevate, who were also Airalo's first investor through the Antler residency program in 2019.

== Airalo Partners ==
Airalo Partners is the business-to-business (B2B) and business-to-business-to-consumer (B2B2C) extension of Airalo. It offers partnership solutions that enable companies to provide travel connectivity services to their customers and manage connectivity for their employees. As of August 2025, it had over 5,000 partners.

== See also ==
- GigSky
- Holafly
- Nomad (eSIM)
- Yesim
