= GigSky =

Mobile technology company

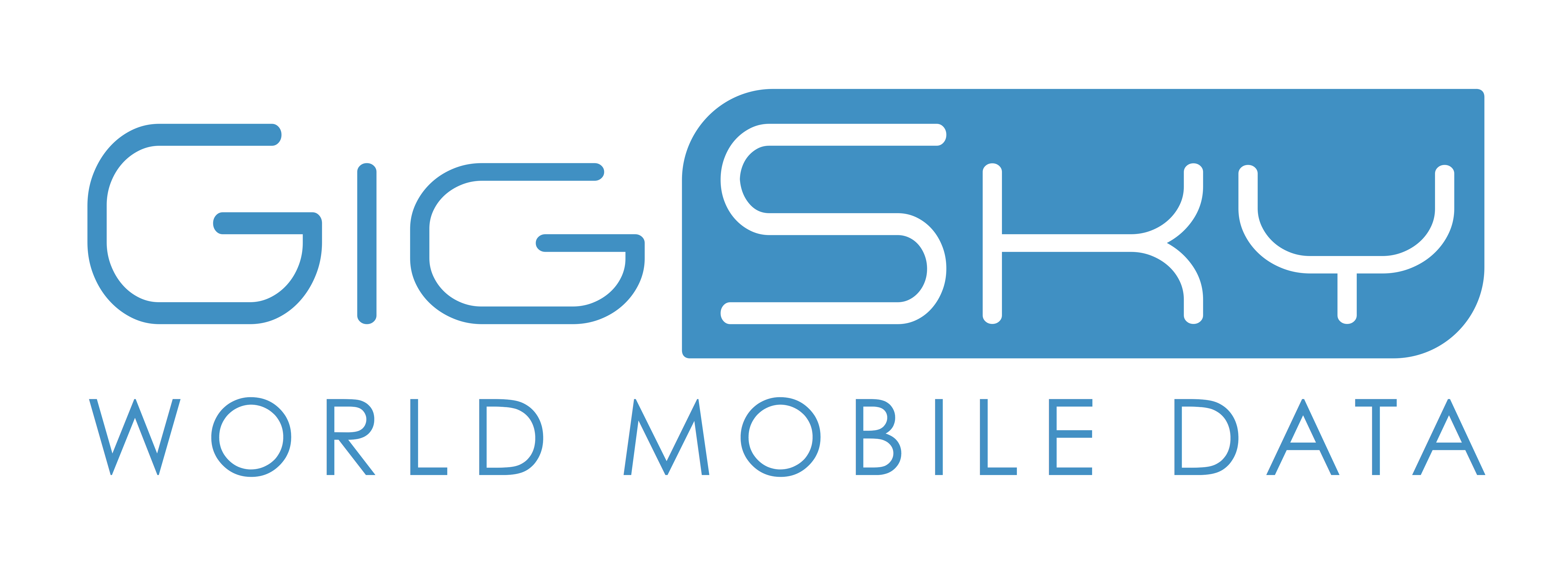
- Industry: Mobile broadband
- Founded: 2010
- Founder: Ravi Rishy-Maharaj
- Headquarters: 935 Commercial Street, Palo Alto, California, United States
- Area served: Global
- Website: www.gigsky.com

GigSky is a Palo Alto, California-based mobile technology company that provides e-SIM and SIM card-based data services to international travelers.

== Service ==
GigSky allows users to connect to public data networks using a mobile app and a GigSky e-SIM or Apple SIM card. GigSky also offers services for enterprise customers, and provides mobile data for airline electronic flight bag (EFB) solutions.

GigSky expanded its cruise ship coverage in October 2025.

== History ==
GigSky was founded in 2010 by Ravi Rishy-Maharaj. In June 2015, Apple began offering access to the GigSky service on cellular iPads with Apple SIM.

Norwegian Air Lines started using GigSky’s service in late 2013 to support its EFB product.

In August 2016, Avionica, an avionics technology company, partnered with GigSky to offer a global flight data transmission service for airlines.

In November 2018, GigSky began offering international data eSIMs on iPhone XS, XS Max, and XR phones.
