= List of Lebanese Australians =

This is a list of Lebanese Australians including both original immigrants who obtained Australian citizenship and their Australian-born descendants who are notable, have made significant contributions to the Australian or international culture or society politically, artistically or scientifically, or have prominently appeared in the news.

== Politics and public service ==
=== Federal politics ===
Name	Party	Chamber	Constituency	Term start	Term end	Notes
Frank Gaha	Labor	House	Denison	1943	1949	
Bob Katter Sr.	National	House	Kennedy	1966	1990	Government minister (1972)
Daryl Melham	Labor	House	Banks	1990	2013	
Bob Katter	National	House	Kennedy	1993	2001	
Bob Katter	Independent	House	Kennedy	2001	2011	
Bob Katter	Katter's Australian	House	Kennedy	2011	present	
Michael Sukkar	Liberal	House	Deakin	2013	2025	Government minister (2019–2022)

=== State and local politics ===
- John Ajaka, former president of the New South Wales Legislative Council
- Alexander Alam, member of the New South Wales Legislative Council
- Marie Bashir, Governor of New South Wales
- Karl Bitar, former national secretary of the Australian Labor Party and former general secretary of NSW Labor
- Steve Bracks, former premier of Victoria
- Samier Dandan, president of Lebanese Muslim Association
- Jihad Dib, New South Wales Minister for Customer Service and Digital Government
- Khalil Eideh, CEO of Bluestar Logistics and member of the Victorian Legislative Council
- Nazih Elasmar, member of the Victorian Legislative Council
- George Joseph, former lord mayor of Adelaide
- Marlene Kairouz, former mayor of Darebin and member of the Victorian Legislative Assembly for the electoral district of Kororoit
- Robbie Katter, member of the Queensland Legislative Assembly
- Salim Mehajer, former Auburn deputy mayor and convicted criminal
- Cesar Melhem, Victorian state secretary of Australian Workers' Union
- Eddie Obeid, corrupt former member of the NSW Legislative Council, former minister for fisheries and mineral resources
- Barbara Perry, NSW parliamentarian
- Jim Saleam, leader of the Australia First Party
- Sir Nicholas Shehadie, Lord Mayor of Sydney (1973–1975) and member of Australian Rugby Union Hall of Fame
- Michael Sutherland, member of the Western Australian Legislative Assembly
- Jackie Trad, former deputy premier of Queensland
- Salim Wardeh, former minister of culture in Lebanon

== Law and judiciary ==
- Sam Doumany, former attorney-general and minister for justice in Queensland

== Business ==
- Stefan Ackerie, hairstyling entrepreneur
- Joseph Assaf, multicultural businessman
- Ahmed Fahour, banker, former CEO of Citibank and NAB's operations, and current CEO of Australia Post
- Jacques Nasser, former CEO of Ford Motors
- Joseph Saba, fashion designer
- John Symond, founder and managing director of Aussie Group

== Sport ==
=== Australian rules football ===
- Max Basheer – former administrator with the South Australian National Football League
- Saad El-Hawli – Essendon AFL player
- Joel Freijah – Western Bulldogs AFL player
- Milham "Mil" Hanna – Carlton AFL player
- Bachar Houli – Richmond AFL player
- Robin Nahas – Richmond AFL player
- Adam Saad – Carlton AFL player
- Vivien Saad – GWS AFLW player
- Christian Salem – Melbourne AFL player
- Emelia Yassir – Richmond AFLW player
- Haneen Zreika – GWS AFLW player

=== Rugby league ===
- Paul Akkary, former professional rugby league footballer for the Newtown Jets
- David Bayssari, former Balmain Tigers NRL player & Lebanon Rugby League head coach
- Hazem El Masri, Canterbury Bulldogs Rugby league player
- Benny Elias, former National Rugby League player
- Robbie Farah, South Sydney Rabbitohs Rugby league player
- Tim Mannah, Parramatta Eels Rugby league player
- Josh Mansour, Penrith Panthers Rugby league player
- Mitchell Moses, professional rugby league player for the Parramatta Eels
- Joe Reaiche, former National Rugby League Sydney Roosters player
- Travis Robinson, international rugby league footballer
- Reece Robinson, international rugby league footballer
- Alex Twal, Wests Tigers player

=== Rugby union ===
- George Ayoub, test match rugby referee, member of the Super Rugby panel for Television Match Officials
- Michael Cheika, head coach of the Wallabies and the New South Wales Waratahs
- Bruce Malouf, former Australian, NSW and Randwick rugby player
- Brendan Nasser, test match rugby player, member of the winning Australian squad at the 1991 Rugby World Cup
- Nicholas Shehadie, former Captain of the Wallabies Australian Rugby Union

=== Soccer ===
- Alex Chidiac, professional women's soccer player for Melbourne City and the Matilda's
- Yahya El Hindi, professional football (soccer) player
- Nathan Elasi, professional football (soccer) player
- Ahmad Elrich, international soccer player
- Tarek Elrich, Newcastle United Jets soccer player
- Buddy Farah, FIFA agent – ex soccer player
- Andrew Nabbout, soccer player for Melbourne City
- Michael Reda, international soccer player
- Robert Younis, professional football (soccer) player

=== Other ===
- Matthew Abood, freestyle swimmer
- Sheik Ali, heavyweight champion wrestler
- Billy Dib, boxer
- Bianca Elmir, female boxing champion
- Safwan Khalil, Olympic champion in taekwando
- Julian Khazzouh, professional basketball player
- Roger Rasheed, international tennis coach and former player
- Eddie Scarf, first Australian to win an Olympic medal in wrestling

== Entertainment and media ==
- David Basheer, sports presenter and commentator
- Tyler De Nawi, actor
- Firass Dirani, actor
- Etcetera Etcetera, drag queen
- Faydee, Pop / R&B singer, songwriter
- Claudia Doumit, actress
- Chillinit, rapper
- Kris Fade, radio presenter, host, and musician
- Jan Fran, journalist, news and current affairs commentator, TV personality
- Daizy Gedeon, award-winning journalist and filmmaker
- Joe Hasham, actor
- Tamara Jaber, singer
- Paul Khoury, TV personality and voice talent
- Paul Nakad, actor and hip hop artist
- Daniella Rahme, TV host, actress and model
- Lincoln Younes, actor, model and voice over artist.
- Mariam Saab, television presenter and journalist
- Daniel Sahyounie, comedian, part of YouTube comedy group The Janoskians
- Natalie Saleeba, television actress
- Rob Shehadie, actor and comedian, co-creator of Here Come the Habibs
- Dean Vegas, singer and Elvis tribute artist
- James Yammouni, comedian, part of YouTube comedy group The Janoskians
- Petra Yared, Australian television actor
- Doris Younane, actress
- Susie Youssef, comedian, writer, actor
- Dan Ilic, comedian, writer, actor and producer

=== Beauty pageant contestants ===
- Sabrina Houssami, 2006 Australian representative at Miss World
- Jessica Kahawaty, beauty pageant contestant who came third in Miss World 2012 when representing Australia

== Fashion designers ==
- Steven Khalil, international designer
- Joseph Saba

== Arts and literature ==
- Mireille Astore, artist and writer
- David Malouf, writer
- Sara Mansour, poet and co-founder of the Bankstown Poetry Slam

== Poets and writers ==
- Michael Mohammed Ahmad – writer
- Mireille Astore – artist and writer
- Saleem Haddad – writer
- Ghassan Hage – academic writer
- Nada Awar Jarrar – author
- David Malouf – poet and author
- Wadih Sa'adeh – poet
- Omar Sakr – poet and author

== Other ==
- Joe Hachem, 2005 World Series of Poker champion
- Mick Hawi, outlaw biker and gangster
- Fehmi Naji, Grand Mufti of Australia
- Keysar Trad, Muslim community spokesman
- Tarek Zahed, outlaw biker and alleged gangster

== See also ==
- Lebanese Australians
- List of Lebanese people
- Lists of Lebanese diaspora
- Syrian Australians
- Palestinian Australians
- Jordanian Australians
