= Belal Jadallah =

Palestinian journalist (1978–2023)

- بلال جادالله
- Born: 1 May 1978; Gaza City
- Died: 19 November 2023 (aged 45); Zeitoun, Gaza City
- Other names: Belal Jadallah Salem; Bilal Jadallah
- Occupation: Journalist

Belal Jadallah Hasan Salem (Arabic: بلال جادالله حسن سالم; 1 May 1978 – 19 November 2023) was a Palestinian journalist and the director of the Press House - Palestine, a press freedom non-governmental organization. He was killed by Israeli shelling during the Gaza war.

== Life and education ==
Jadallah was born on 1 May 1978 in Gaza. He earned a bachelor's degree in English literature. Four of Jadallah's relatives work for Reuters. His youngest brother Ali Jadallah is a photojournalist.

== Career ==
Jadallah worked as the director of media and international relations at Palestinian National Authority until 2006. He was the Head of the Palestinian Independent Center for Media Services until 2013.

In 2014, Jadallah founded Press House-Palestine, a Gazan non-profit organization focused on freedom of the press and journalism education. Jadallah and his organization were influential to many Gazan journalists, and Jadallah was described as the "godfather of Palestinian journalists". For decades, he had trained journalists and taught safety courses.

Jadallah had also contributed to work by the Committee to Protect Journalists, including by locating family members of journalists killed by the Israeli military in Gaza and acquiring photos for a May 2023 report.

Belal reported on the Gaza war from Gaza. Jadallah and Press House also worked to provide safety and technical equipment and office space to journalists covering the conflict. According to his brother, photojournalist Ali Jadallah, he had been "very determined to stay in Gaza City for over a month and strongly believed it was his moral duty to tell the world what he witnesses in the besieged small city, assisting the needy people around him amid this humanitarian catastrophe".

== Death ==
According to members of his family, Jadallah had told them he was planning to travel south from Gaza City on 19 November when he was killed in his car by an Israeli strike in the neighborhood of Zeitoun. His family also said that Jadallah's brother-in-law, Abdulkareem Abed, was seriously injured in the strike. He was 45.

== See also ==
- Plestia Alaqad
- Wael Al-Dahdouh
- Motaz Azaiza
- List of journalists killed in the Gaza war
- Bisan Owda
- Killing of journalists in the Gaza war
