= Ahmed Shihab-Eldin =

American-Kuwaiti journalist (born 1984)

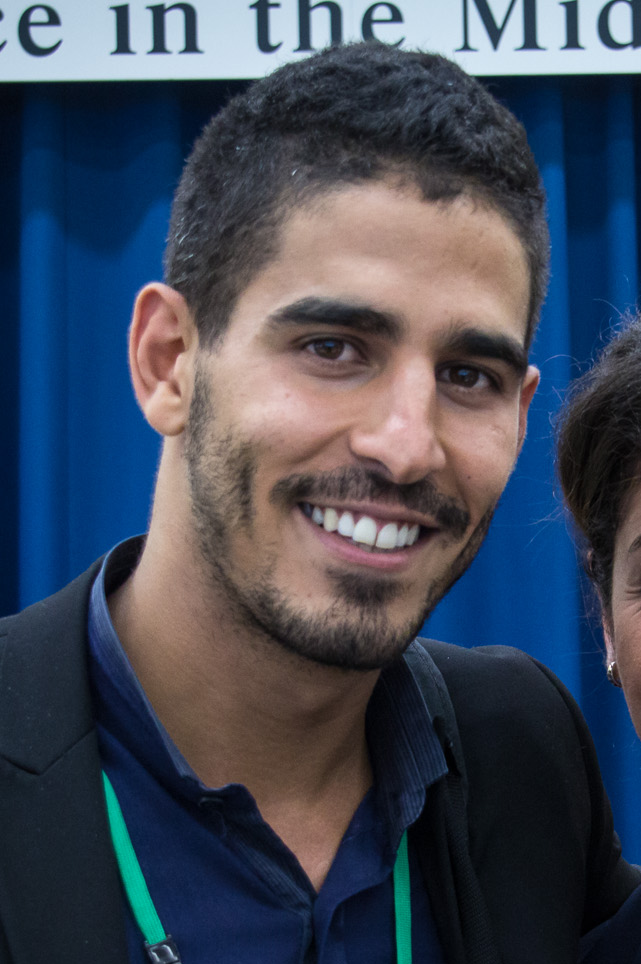
- Shihab-Eldin in 2014
- Born: September 16, 1984 (age 42); Berkeley, California, United States
- Other name: Ahmed Eldin
- Citizenship: United States; Kuwait (until 2026)
- Education: American International School Vienna; Cairo American College; Columbia University Graduate School of Journalism
- Occupations: Journalist; actor; producer
- Employers: PBS; Vice; Al Jazeera English; AJ+; Huffington Post; The New York Times
- Criminal charges: False reporting; harm to the national security of Kuwait; mobile phone misuse
- Criminal status: Released, not fully acquitted
- Awards: Webby Award (2008); Amnesty International UK Media Award in Digital Creativity (2023); Amnesty International Australia Human Rights Defender Award (2024); Democracy for the Arab World Now "Jamal Khashoggi" Defender of Justice Award (2026)
- Website: ahmedshihabeldin.com

Ahmed Shihab-Eldin (Arabic: أحمد شهاب الدين; born September 16, 1984), often simply Ahmed Eldin, is an American-born Kuwaiti journalist, actor and media personality of Palestinian descent.

== Early life and education ==
Born in Berkeley, California, into a Kuwaiti family of Palestinian descent, Shihab-Eldin was raised between Kuwait, Egypt, the U.S. and Austria, having studied at the American International School of Vienna and the Cairo American College. In 2007, he graduated with honors from the Columbia University Graduate School of Journalism.

== Career ==
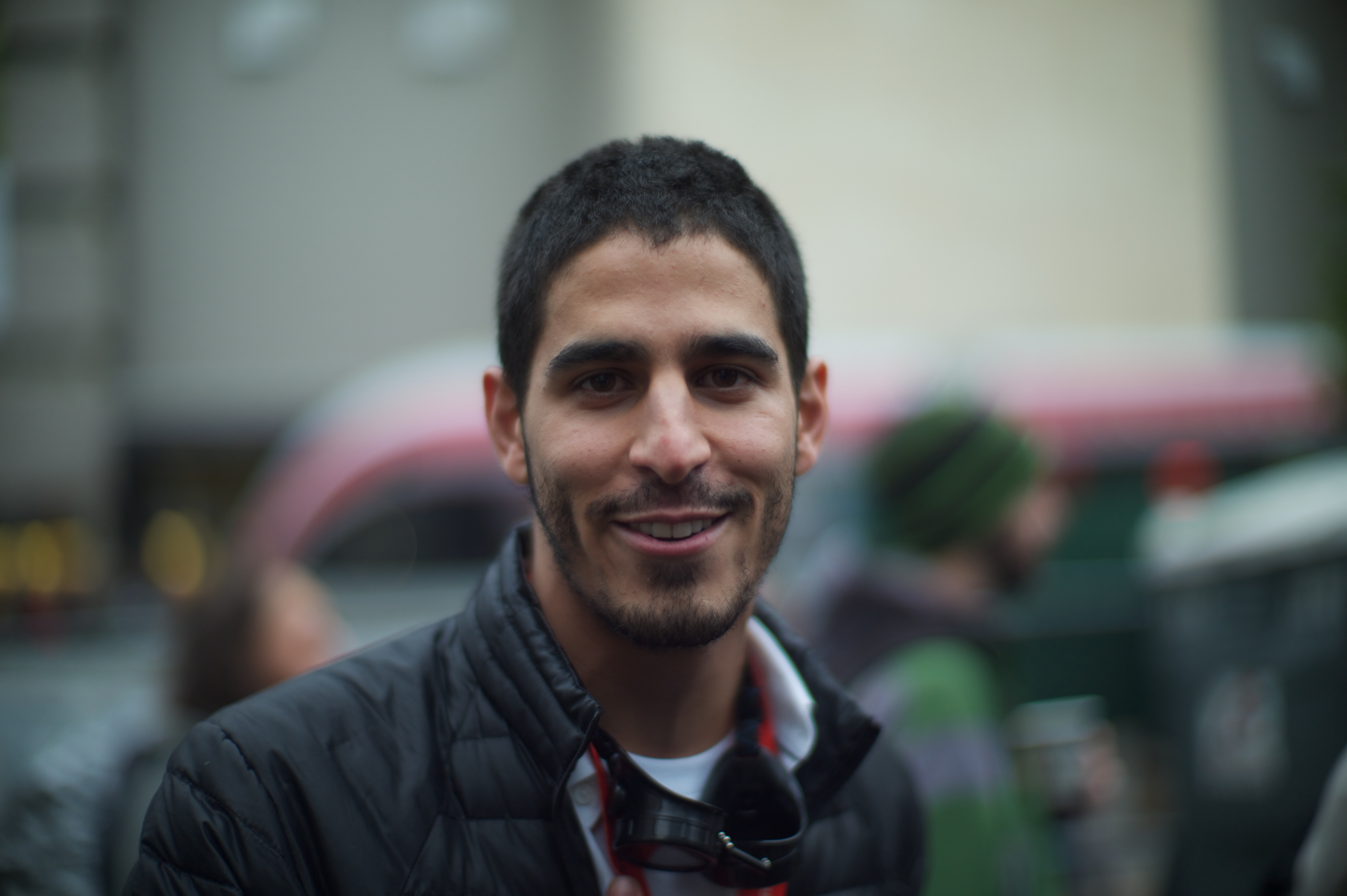
Shihab-Eldin at South by Southwest 2012

Shihab-Eldin started his career at PBS and as a news producer with The New York Times in 2008. During a brief experience at the Doha Film Institute, he contributed to the launch of the Doha Tribeca Film Festival. After joining Al Jazeera English in 2009, he was a senior reporter for Al Jazeera Plus from 2017 through 2020. By then, he had also worked at Huffington Post and Vice. He produced several documentaries for Wide Angle on PBS and others for Vice on HBO.

In 2020, during the COVID-19 pandemic, Shihab-Eldin began moving towards other creative pursuits, creating a parody account on the short video platform TikTok and suggesting that he might begin podcasting. He replied, in character, to a video by the Instagram and YouTube star Faiza Rammuny and it went viral, launching this leg of his career. He published his first book, Demanding Dignity, in 2021.

In 2023, he produced and presented an investigative documentary Queer Egypt Under Attack for BBC News focussing on the treatment of LGBT people in Egypt. The same year, he was featured in the Jordanian film The Red Sea Makes Me Wanna Cry, which premiered at the Cannes Film Festival and was awarded in the short film category at the El Gouna Film Festival. He then acted in the 2024 queer short film All the Men I Met but Never Dated, and in the 2025 film Palestine 36, in the role of Maher.

Having previously been an adjunct professor in Digital Media at his alma mater, the Columbia University's Graduate School of Journalism, since December 2025 Shihab-Eldin has been teaching Storytelling and Communication at the University of Bari, Italy.

Since September 2025, first on Substack and later on his personal website, Shihab-Eldin has published the newsletter Out Loud.

== Awards and recognition ==
In 2008, Shihab-Eldin won a Webby Award for master's digital media project, "Defining Middle Ground: The Next Generation of Muslim New Yorkers."

In 2012, he was nominated for an Emmy Award for Most Innovative Program in 2012, for creating and co-hosting the Al Jazeera interactive talk show The Stream.

In 2023, Shihab-Eldin won an Amnesty International UK Media Award in Digital Creativity for his BBC documentary Queer Egypt Under Attack, which also earned him a British Journalism Award for Social Affairs, Diversity & Inclusion.

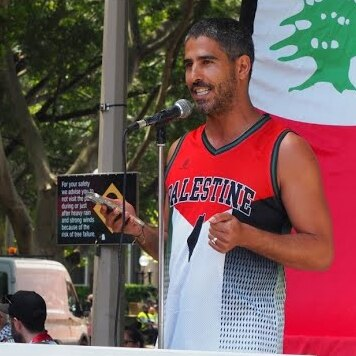
Shihad-Eldin speaking at a protest against the Gaza genocide in Hyde Park, Sydney in December 2024.

In December 2024, he shared Amnesty International Australia's inaugural Human Rights Defender Award with Palestinian journalists Bisan Owda, Plestia Alaqad, and Anas Al-Sharif for "the significant impact of their fearless reporting on the alleged genocide in Gaza, their innovative use of social media and citizen journalism to challenge traditional narratives and their ability to inspire action for justice."

On October 5, 2026, non-profit organization Democracy for the Arab World Now (DAWN) awarded Shihab-Eldin – alongside Tanya Haj-Hassan – the "Jamal Khashoggi" Defender of Justice Award, for his activity as a reporter leading him to be arrested and stripped of his Kuwaiti citizenship.

== Imprisonment ==
On March 3, 2026, Shihab-Eldin was detained by Kuwaiti authorities for resharing news articles about the Iran war; the previous day, he had posted images of a U.S. fighter jet crashing over the country. The Committee to Protect Journalists (CPJ) reported that he had not been seen publicly in Kuwait, where he was visiting family, since March 2, and that he was under arrest over accusations of "spreading false information," "harming national security" and "misusing his mobile phone;" the incident occurred as part of a wider wave of crackdowns targeting journalists across different Gulf states amid the war.

Francesca Albanese, UN Special Rapporteur on the occupied Palestinian territories, confirmed on March 14 that he had been imprisoned by Kuwaiti authorities for his work, and asked that he be released. The following month, the CPJ opened a petition to pressure Kuwait to liberate him "immediately and unconditionally." The University of Bari, where he was working at the time of his arrest, joined calls for his release. On April 23, the CPJ and Shihab-Eldin's lawyer Caoilfhionn Gallagher confirmed he had been acquitted of all charges and was soon to be released.

On April 29, 2026, an Emiri decree appeared in the official gazette Al Kuwait Al Yawm with a list of citizens who had been stripped of their Kuwaiti citizenship, which included Shihab-Eldin's name. The same day, Jodie Ginsberg from CPJ relayed a new statement from his lawyers that he had not been fully acquitted, with the prosecution having appealed the disposal of the charges.

== Personal life ==
Shihab-Eldin identifies as queer.
