= Bisan Owda =

Palestinian journalist and activist

- بيسان عودة
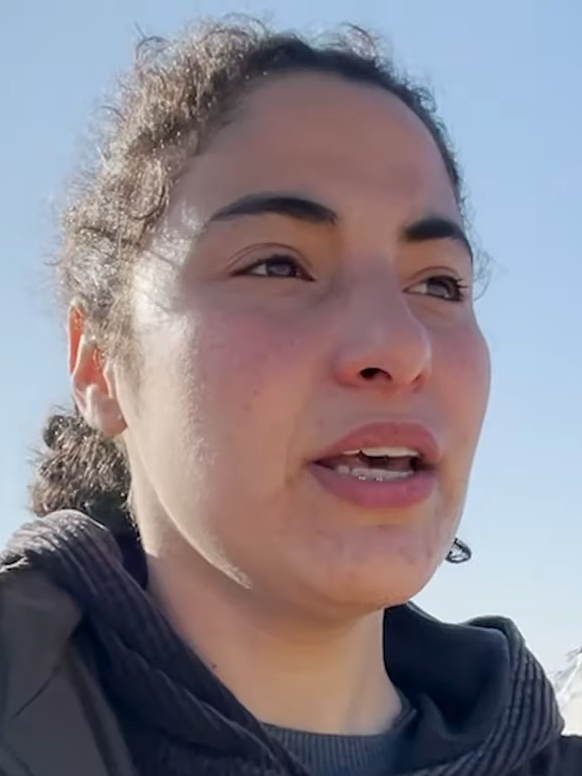
- Owda in 2024
- Born: 1997 or 1998 (age 27–28)
- Occupations: Journalist; activist; filmmaker
- Known for: Documenting the Gaza war on social media
- Awards: Emmy Award, Peabody Award, Edward R. Murrow Award

Instagram information
- Page: Bisan Owda
- Genre: Journalism
- Followers: 5 million
- Last updated: 14 October 2025

Bisan Owda (Arabic: بيسان عودة; born 1997 or 1998) is a Palestinian journalist, activist, and filmmaker. She is best known for social media videos documenting her experiences during the Gaza war and Gaza genocide.

For her Al Jazeera Media Network show, It's Bisan from Gaza and I'm Still Alive, she won a 2024 Peabody Award in the News category and an Edward R. Murrow Award for News Series, as well as a 2024 News and Documentary Emmy Award for Outstanding Hard News Feature Story: Short Form.

== Early life and career ==
Owda grew up in Beit Hanoun. As a member of UN Women's Youth Gender Innovation Agora Forum, she has worked to promote gender equality. She has worked with the European Union on climate change and is an EU Goodwill Ambassador. Owda also works for the United Nations Population Fund (UNFPA).

Owda produces a show for Roya TV called Hakawatia which explores Palestinian history and culture. She also presented educational Palestinian Arabic videos for the YouTube channel Easy Languages.

During the 2021 Israel–Palestine crisis, Owda shared videos on Instagram to draw international attention to conditions in Gaza.

== Gaza war and genocide (2023–present) ==
During the Gaza war and Gaza genocide, which began in October 2023, Owda garnered attention for her semi-regular video and livestream updates on social media documenting Palestinian civilians' experiences. She became known for opening her videos with some variation of the phrase, "I'm still alive". Her videos are mostly in English, though some are in Arabic. Her work has been shared by BBC News, Al Jazeera, and ABC News. In her videos, she has reported on Israeli Defense Forces (IDF) attacks, as well as the lack of food, shelter, medical care, and other resources. By May 2024, Owda had accumulated 4.1 million followers.

=== Reporting and activism ===
After the IDF told Gaza residents to evacuate from the North of Gaza in October 2023, Owda and her parents relocated from Beit Hanoun to Al-Shifa Hospital. Her family's home and her office in Rimal were both bombed, destroying all of Owda's filming equipment. As a result, Owda uses her phone to record video. From Al-Shifa Hospital, Owda reported on the spread of illness among the 50,000 displaced people who lacked adequate shelter, water, and sanitation.

On November 3, Owda witnessed the Al-Shifa ambulance airstrike. Owda documented the "increasingly critical situation" on social media, reporting a lack of food and water, destruction of solar panels, and bombings. She was displaced from Al-Shifa Hospital after it was sieged by the IDF in mid-November and reported that injured people were dying due to the lack of medical care. She posted videos of her journey walking south to Khan Yunis in which she described dead bodies on the side of the road and interviewed other refugees.

In early December, Owda posted: "I no longer have any hope of survival like I had at the beginning of this genocide". She also wrote about dealing with nightmares and illness. Her statement was cited in several news articles which referenced the killing of journalists in the Gaza war. Later that month, Owda posted that she had to cut her hair because she did not have adequate water or supplies to care for it. She also reported on the lack of bathrooms and menstrual pads in the Khan Yunis refugee camp.

In a viral Instagram post, Owda joined others in calling for a global strike on December 11 in support of a ceasefire in Gaza. She asked her followers to "boycott everything". The strike was observed by people from multiple countries, including the United States, Lebanon, and the UK. Participants attended protests, closed businesses, and refrained from spending money.

In February 2024, Owda reported on the Flour Massacre. She stated that Palestinians in Gaza were experiencing "forced starvation" and that the IDF had killed them while they were running towards aid trucks.

In April, Owda was one of more than 24 Palestinian journalists who signed a letter calling for other journalists to boycott the White House Correspondents Dinner in protest of the killing of Palestinian journalists and the Israeli blockade of aid to Gaza. Other signatories included Said Arikat, Mariam Barghouti, and Mohammed El Kurd. Later that month, she praised the pro-Palestinian protests on university campuses, saying that they gave her hope.

=== Recognition ===
Along with other Palestinian journalists, Owda has been credited with humanizing Gaza for an international audience. She has been said to be "providing a human lens", "putting a face to the conflict", and putting "a human face on the realities of daily life in Gaza". Tafi Mhaka wrote that her work challenges mainstream narratives about Palestinians and the source of the Israeli–Palestinian conflict. An essay in the Los Angeles Review of Books stated that Owda and other Palestinian journalists reporting from Gaza "charge their viewers with complicity and regularly demand that we act".

Owda's social media followers have expressed concern for her safety.

By early 2024, Owda had been depicted in two murals, one in Edinburgh and one in London.

In May 2024, Owda won a Peabody Award in the News category for her Al Jazeera Media Network show, It's Bisan from Gaza and I'm Still Alive. In a statement, the Peabody board of jurors wrote: "Reporting from her makeshift tent outside the medical center, she shows what survival looks like for her and the masses around her". The award was presented by Mo Amer, and Owda attended the ceremony via video. In her acceptance speech, Owda dedicated her award to people protesting in support of Palestine and called for: "an end to the genocide, a ceasefire, and a free Palestine".

In December 2024, Owda shared Amnesty International Australia's inaugural Human Rights Defender Award with Palestinian journalists Anas Al-Sharif, Plestia Alaqad, and Ahmed Shihab-Eldin for "the significant impact of their fearless reporting on the genocide in Gaza, their innovative use of social media and citizen journalism to challenge traditional narratives and their ability to inspire action for justice."

=== Emmy award and petition to rescind nomination ===
In July 2024, It's Bisan from Gaza and I'm Still Alive was nominated for the 45th News and Documentary Emmy Awards for Outstanding Hard News Feature Story: Short Form. Pro-Israel nonprofit Creative Community for Peace (CCFP) called for the nomination to be rescinded, alleging Owda was a member of the Popular Front for the Liberation of Palestine, which the United States designated as a terrorist organization, and publishing an open letter signed by 150 people involved in the entertainment industry, including Selma Blair, Sherry Lansing, and Debra Messing.

The president of the National Academy of Television Arts and Sciences, Adam Sharp, announced Owda's nomination would not be rescinded, writing that "NATAS has been unable to corroborate these reports" of Owda's alleged involvement and "found no grounds, to date, upon which to overturn the editorial judgment of the independent journalists who reviewed the material."

Al Jazeera released a statement criticizing "efforts to silence her reporting from Gaza" and calling the allegations against her "baseless". The network also said this effort threatened her safety, noting Israeli forces had killed 160 journalists since the start of the war.

The fact-checking website Misbar called CCFP's effort to get Owda's Emmy nomination rescinded a smear campaign. The national deputy director for the Council on American-Islamic Relations called the petition's signatories "hypocritical", saying that the scrutiny applied to Palestinians would not be applied to an Israeli photographed with Benjamin Netanyahu. On 25 September, the documentary won an Emmy.

=== TikTok account ban ===
In January 2026, Owda reported that her TikTok account had been permanently banned, just days after the platform was acquired by American investors.

== Awards and nominations ==
Year	Award	Category	Work	Result	Ref.
2024	Peabody Awards	News	It's Bisan from Gaza and I'm Still Alive	Won	
2024	Edward R. Murrow Award	News Series — Large Digital Organization	It's Bisan from Gaza and I'm Still Alive	Won	
2024	News and Documentary Emmy Awards	Outstanding Hard News Feature Story: Short Form	It's Bisan from Gaza and I'm Still Alive	Won	
2024	Amnesty International Australia	Human Rights Defender Award	Herself	Won	

== See also ==
- Motaz Azaiza
- Wael Al-Dahdouh
- Plestia Alaqad
- History of Palestinian journalism
