= The Eyes of Gaza =

2025 memoir by Plestia Alaqad

The Eyes of Gaza: A Diary of Resilience
- Author: Plestia Alaqad
- Language: English
- Subject: Gaza war, Journalism, Palestinian people
- Genre: Memoir, War journalism
- Publisher: Little, Brown and Company (US); Pan Macmillan (UK)
- Publication date: September 30, 2025
- ISBN: 978-0-316-59745-6

The Eyes of Gaza: A Diary of Resilience is a 2025 memoir by Palestinian journalist Plestia Alaqad, published by Little, Brown and Company in the United States and Pan Macmillan in the United Kingdom. The book is drawn from diary entries Alaqad kept during the 45 days she spent reporting in Gaza following the October 7, 2023 Hamas attack on Israel and the ensuing Israeli military assault on Gaza. It debuted on the New York Times Paperback Nonfiction Best Sellers list in October 2025.

== Background ==
Alaqad was born on 10 December 2001 and grew up in the Gaza Strip. She attended the American International School in the city of Beit Lahia, and later enrolled at Eastern Mediterranean University in what is de facto Northern Cyprus to study New Media and Journalism, graduating in 2022. Alaqad was due to start a new job on 8 October 2023. However, on 7 October 2023, the Hamas-led attack on Israel triggered what would become the deadliest war of the Arab–Israeli conflict. Shortly after the Israeli government declared that it was imposing a "total blockade" on the Gaza Strip, Alaqad began documenting the effects of the Israeli bombardment campaign and posted the video diaries to her Instagram account.

Alaqad evacuated Gaza with her family in late November 2023, eventually relocating to Lebanon, where she received the Shireen Abu Akleh Memorial Scholarship to pursue a master's degree in media studies.

Alaqad has described keeping a diary since childhood, beginning with a purple notebook given to her by her mother in sixth grade. During the conflict, she continued writing private entries, and decided to publish them after recognizing that her experience represented of millions of Palestinians. Prior to publication, her coverage of the war earned her the Amnesty International Australia Human Rights Defender Award, the One Young World Journalist of the Year Award, and the Lyra McKee Award for Bravery. The BBC named her among its 100 Women of the Year.

== Content ==
The book is Alaqad's diary entries from the period immediately before October 7, 2023 and the 45 days that followed. Alaqad documents her experiences moving between temporary shelters, reporting from hospitals, and attempting to maintain contact with friends and family as she faces displacement and the threat of bombardment. The entries describe daily details of survival alongside accounts of the destruction she witnessed.

The book includes an original poem by Alaqad titled "Only in Gaza," as well as a new afterword written for the published edition describing her departure from Gaza and arrival in Lebanon, where she found the conflict following her. Alaqad writes in English rather than Arabic, her first language, calling the choice as a deliberate effort to reach the widest possible international audience.

The book also covers Alaqad's relationship with her mentor Belal Jadallah, who was killed when an Israeli tank shelled his car.

== Reception ==
=== Critical reception ===
Slate reviewed the book as a "haunting chronicle of a people's collective experience under unrelenting siege," praising Alaqad's ability to balance accounts of violence with humanizing details of everyday Palestinian life. A review in Dawn Images called it "the kind of book that makes you wonder what you'd put in your emergency bag" and described it as reading "in some ways like a dystopian novel," while emphasizing that the events described are real.

In an interview with Nieman Reports, Alaqad spoke about the book's transition from personal diary to public record."What started as personal notes and small updates grew into something much bigger than me," she said. "When I realized people were looking to my words not just for my story but for Gaza's story, I felt a huge responsibility."

Dazed reviewed the book as doing "well to humanise not just herself, but every individual she writes about.".

Speaking to El País, Alaqad said of the experiences she detailed in the book: "I don't wish the choice between staying in their homeland and saving their life on anyone."

=== Sales ===
The book debuted on the New York Times Paperback Nonfiction Best Sellers list for the week ending October 4, 2025. It was described as an international bestseller in a March 2026 profile in Harper's Bazaar Arabia. The New Arab listed it among ten essential books by Palestinian authors.

An excerpt was published by Zeteo on October 13, 2025.

== See also ==
- Plestia Alaqad
- Gaza war
- Palestinian literature
