= Halal Gurls =

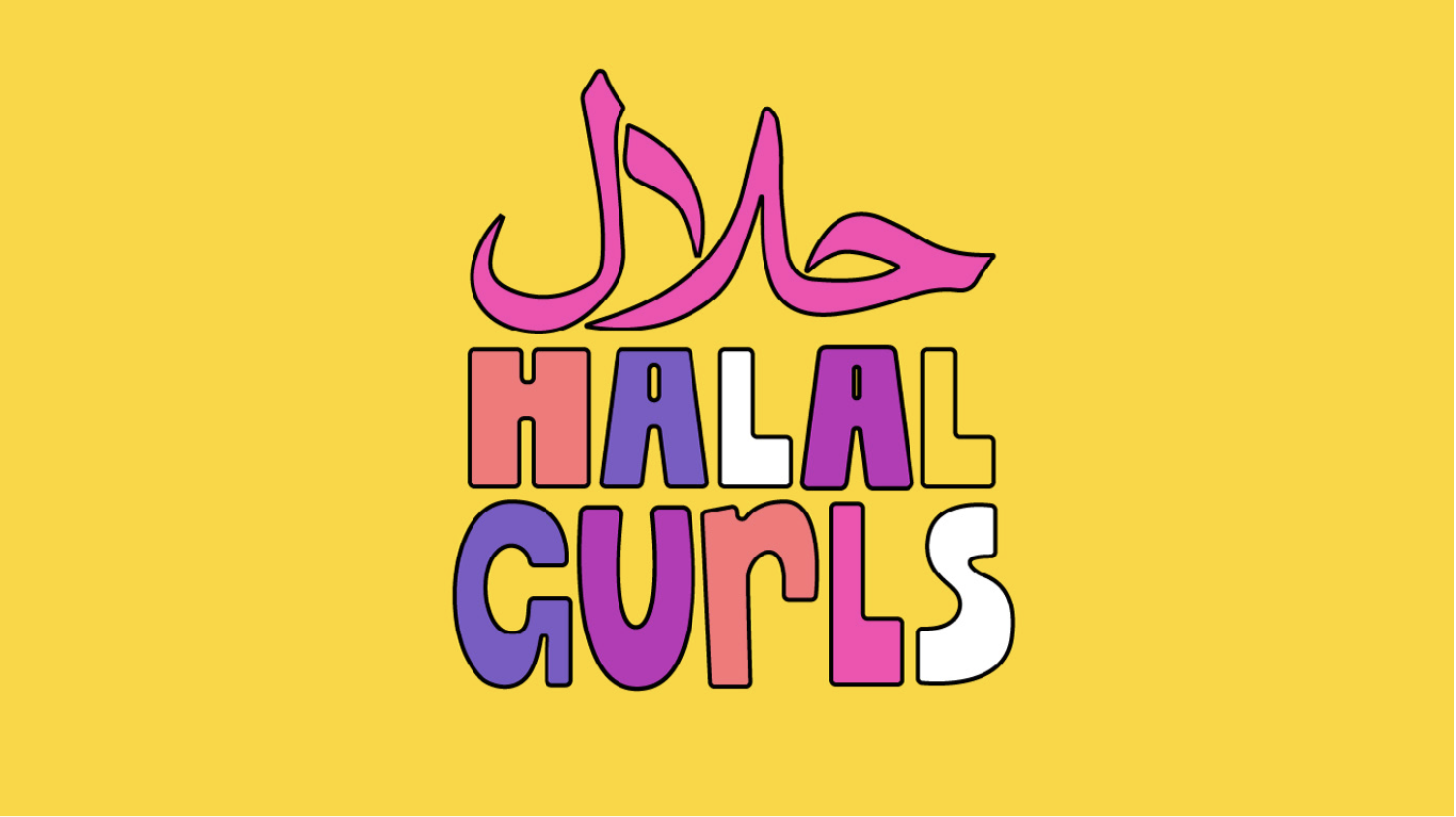
- Genre: Comedy-Drama
- Created by: Vonne Patiag
- Starring: Aanisa Vylet; Jessica Phoebe Hanna; Hajer; Bryan Brown; Sahar Gebara; Zahra Al-Awady; UC Brigante; James Mitry; Vonne Patiag; Brielle Flynn
- Composer: Ahmed Kamal
- Country of origin: Australia
- Original language: English
- No. of series: 1
- No. of episodes: 6

Production
- Executive producers: Rick Kalowski; Jo Bell
- Producers: Petra Lovrencic; Vonne Patiag
- Editor: Vonne Patiag
- Camera setup: Single-camera
- Running time: 6 - 10 minutes
- Production company: In-Between Pictures

Original release
- Network: Australian Broadcasting Corporation
- Release: October 4, 2019 – present

Halal Gurls is an Australian comedy-drama online series created by Vonne Patiag. The series offers a candid look into the lives of three 20-something Hijabis living their best lives in Sydney, Australia as they endure the unseen everyday culture clash between their faith and desire.

The first season of Halal Gurls was filmed in April 2019. The premiere trailer launched on September 8, 2019, racking up 50,000+ views in 72 hours, a record for any ABC original show. The series premiered on ABC iView on October 4, 2019 and premiered globally on the ABC Comedy YouTube channel on October 9, 2019. It has since become one of the highest viewed original series on the channel.

Since its release, the series has generated both praise and criticism over its depiction of modern Muslim women, and has been celebrated as the world's first hijabi comedy series.

== Synopsis ==
Mouna is a workaholic hijabi constantly caught between two worlds – the structured career-driven life she envisions for herself, and the chaotic mess of her personal life. To finally succeed, Mouna must learn to navigate an overbearing Mother, a pushy fiancé, a social-media addicted sister, gossiping packs of Hijabis and a ‘racist’ workplace to climb the corporate ladder - a seemingly impossible task. Luckily, being a tough Muslim girl in Australia, she knows a thing or two about resilience and she tackles this cross-cultural balancing act head on.

== Cast and characters ==
=== Main cast ===
- Aanisa Vylet as Mouna: a workaholic hijabi and aspiring lawyer who is trapped working as a paralegal in a 'slightly' problematic law firm.
- Jessica Phoebe Hanna as Foufou: Mouna's older cousin. A tough-talking chainsmoker, she is married with two children, but her fierceness is challenged when she begins to suspect her husband is cheating on her.
- Hajer as Fatty: Mouna's younger sister. She doesn't wear the hijab and is social media obsessed, getting into constant scandals that threaten Mouna's family name.
- Bryan Brown as Gordon: the Senior Partner of the law firm where Mouna works. He initially passes Mouna over for a promotion, but is secretly supporting her career ambitions.

=== Recurring cast ===
- Sahar Gebara as Samira: Mouna's mother, who is trying to keep her family together and emotionally support Mouna, even if she acts like she doesn't need it.
- Zahra Al-Awady as Houda: an uptight Hijabi who likes to gossip and judge others. She is Foufou's sworn nemesis.
- UC Brigante as Tarek: Mouna's fiancée, he has been patient with Mouna while she pursues her career, but after three years of waiting for their wedding day, he begins to feel the pressures from his own family.
- James Mitry as Hassan: Foufou's bumbling husband who may or may not be cheating.
- Vonne Patiag as Rakesh: Mouna's main rival at the law firm in going for a 'diversity' position. Self described as an 'Asian pansexual refugee.'
- Brielle Flynn as Bethany: one of Mouna's lovely coworkers who rubs her the wrong way with her innate privilege gained by being a 'white woman.' First thought to be disabled as she appears in a wheelchair after a skiing accident.

== Production ==
The idea for Halal Gurls was first conceived by Patiag when working at Hijab House, a modest fashion store based in Western Sydney. He would take lunch breaks with the shopgirls who were all Hijabi women, and soon learned they were 'fierce and funny' - unlike the stereotypes depicted on TV. Their 'resilience' inspired the characters in the show.

The first season of Halal Gurls was funded through the Digital First Comedy Initiative by a partnership with the Australian Broadcasting Corporation, Create NSW and the Information + Cultural Exchange.

Patiag is the Showrunner and Head Writer of the series. The production collaborated with a writer's room of Muslim women to ensure all the story lines came from the community represented.

== Episodes ==
=== Series 1 ===
| No. | Title | Directed by | Written by | Release Date |
|---|---|---|---|---|
| 1 | "No Naseeb" | Vonne Patiag | Vonne Patiag | 4 October 2019 |
After getting passed over for a promotion, Mouna, a 20-something workaholic Hijabi, decides to take control of her ‘naseeb’ (destiny!) but her pushy fiancée, Tarek, and overbearing family have other plans in store for her.
| 2 | "Not Even Water" | Vonne Patiag | Hajer and Vonne Patiag | 4 October 2019 |
When Mouna misses ‘suhoor’ (morning meal) during Ramadan, her limits are tested when she's tasked with buying a new outfit to meet Tarek's parents and comes up against a gossiping group of Hijabis while absolutely starving.
| 3 | "Going Up" | Vonne Patiag | Sara Mansour and Vonne Patiag | 4 October 2019 |
When a new diversity position is announced at her work, Mouna must face off against Rakesh, a pansexual South-East Asian co-worker, to prove to her boss who is more diverse and suitable for the top job.
| 4 | "For The Likes" | Vonne Patiag | Vonne Patiag and Danielle Stamoulos | 4 October 2019 |
After her younger sister Fatty is catfished, Mouna must protect her family name by breaking into a private chat group of sinister men before ‘nude’ photos of her sister are leaked online.
| 5 | "After Hours" | Vonne Patiag | Vonne Patiag and Aanisa Vylet | 4 October 2019 |
During a Layliah (Muslim Hen's night), Mouna and her older cousin Foufou agree to have a ‘drama-free’ night with no men, but chaos ensues when Tarek turns up unannounced.
| 6 | "Driving Lessons" | Vonne Patiag | Vonne Patiag | 4 October 2019 |
After Mouna is offered a scholarship to study at her dream grad school, family drama makes her question if she's ready to accept her uncertain future or not.

== Reception ==
The series was lauded for its positive and nuanced representation of modern Muslim women, praised that its "commentary on young women in the workplace and the older white men who prevent them from succeeding, is spot on."

The series has received some backlash in the US, particularly with its Muslim centric storylines, with some people regarding it as 'social engineering.'

The series has been nominated for the Best Online Series - Drama or Comedy at the 2020 AACTA awards, and also for Best Screenplay - Web Series at the 2020 AWGIE awards.
