= Sara Mansour =

Australian lawyer and poet

- Born: 16 May 1993 (age 33); Bankstown, New South Wales
- Citizenship: Australian
- Education: Western Sydney University (Bachelor of Laws)
- Occupation: Lawyer

Sara Mansour is an Australian lawyer, writer, poet, and founder/artistic director of the Bankstown Poetry Slam. The Bankstown Poetry Slam is the largest regular Poetry Slam in Australia that offers an artistic outlet for the young people of Western Sydney to share their voices in a safe and inclusive environment.

== Education ==
Mansour graduated in 2016 with a Bachelor of Laws from Western Sydney University.

== Career ==
Mansour co-founded Bankstown Poetry Slam in 2013. Bankstown Poetry Slam holds monthly workshops and Poetry Slam performance evenings. Slams often have more than 300 guests (the "slamily") in attendance and have featured notable poets such as the late Candy Royalle, Rupi Kaur, and Omar Musa. Mansour also co-founded the first ever National Youth Poetry Slam in 2022.

In 2018, Mansour was one of the nine founding board members of NOW Australia (a national organisation that sought to provide assistance to victims of sexual harassment, intimidation, or abuse in the workplace) led by veteran Australian journalist Tracey Spicer AM. In 2019, Mansour co-wrote an episode of Halal Gurls, an Australian comedy-drama on ABC TV about a group of Muslim women, their careers, and their personal lives in Western Sydney. The show was nominated for an AACTA Award in 2020.

In 2023, Mansour was appointed as youngest-ever board member of the Opera House Trust and will sit alongside the first Indigenous chair, Professor Michael McDaniel. In 2024, Mansour and the Bankstown Poetry Slam team hosted Palestinian journalist, Plestia Alaqad, for a sold out slam at the Sydney Town Hall.

== Honours and recognition ==
- 2017 Canterbury-Bankstown Australia Day Award for Young Citizen of the Year
- 2023 Western Sydney Community Forum ZEST Award for Outstanding Voluntary Leader
- 2024 Creative Australia $50,000 Marten Bequest Travelling Scholarship Recipient
- 2024 NSW Young Australian of the Year finalist
