= International reactions to the 2021 Israel–Palestine crisis =

The following is the list of international reactions to the 2021 Israel–Palestine crisis.

== International organisations ==
Organisation	Response(s)
European Union	The European Union called on both sides to de-escalate tensions and reiterated "violence and incitement are unacceptable and the perpetrators on all sides must be held accountable".
United Nations	The UN called on Israel to cancel any planned evictions and use "maximum restraint in the use of force" against protesters. The United Nations Security Council met for a closed session on 10 May to discuss the issue. There, they discussed issuing a statement, which was rejected due to concerns from the United States.
Arab League	An emergency online meeting was held on 11 May. Secretary-General of the Arab League, Ahmed Aboul Gheit, condemned Israeli air strikes on Gaza as "indiscriminate and irresponsible".
Organisation of Islamic Cooperation	On 11 May, the Organisation of Islamic Cooperation condemned Israel and reiterated support for Palestine.
International Criminal Court	On 12 May 2021, prosecutor Fatou Bensouda said she was concerned about the escalating violence and the possibility of war crimes being committed.
Turkic Council	On 12 May 2021, the Secretary General of the Turkic Council Baghdad Amreyev told that they condemn "using weapons and unproportioned use of force by Israeli security forces against innocent Palestinian civilians". Also calling on the Israeli administration to take "the necessary measures for a peaceful resolution of the situation and an immediate cessation of attacks on civilians and armed infiltration of Muslim holy sites".

== National ==
=== UN member and observer states ===
Country	Response(s)
Argentina	The Ministry of Foreign Affairs issued a statement condemning both the use of excessive force by Israeli security forces and Hamas for launching rockets against Israeli soil. It further expressed worry and urged both sides to de-escalate tensions.
Armenia	On 11 May, Ministry of Foreign Affairs expressed its "deep concern" over the clashes, calling on "all the involved parties to show restraint to reduce the tension and prevent future deaths among civilians".
Australia	On 12 May, Foreign Affairs Minister Marise Payne expressed concern about the violence and called on both sides to restore calm. Prime Minister Scott Morrison echoed these calls, while also criticising a protester for burning an Israeli flag in Lakemba, New South Wales.
Austria	Chancellor Sebastian Kurz reiterated Austria's support of Israel's right to self-defence. As a show of solidarity he ordered to hoist Israel's flag on the Chancellery next to the Austrian and European flag. Foreign minister Alexander Schallenberg ordered to do the same for his ministry.
Bahrain	On 8 May, the Times of Israel reported that Bahraini officials strongly condemned actions at the Al-Aqsa Mosque and the potential evictions in Sheikh Jarrah, and called on Israel to "stop these rejected provocations against the people of Jerusalem, and work to prevent its forces from attacking worshipers in this holy month".
Bangladesh	On 11 May, Prime Minister Sheikh Hasina sent a letter to President Mahmoud Abbas condemning the storming of Al-Aqsa Mosque by Israeli police, stating that their actions were of a "terrorist nature". She criticised the planned evictions of Palestinian families from the Sheikh Jarrah neighbourhood as a "severe violation of human rights" and re-affirmed Bangladesh's commitment to a two-state solution. She expressed solidarity with the "brotherly" Palestinian people.
Botswana	On 18 May, the Ministry of Foreign Affairs and International Cooperation released a statement saying that "the Government of Botswana strongly condemns the escalation of the attacks and calls for a ceasefire", and called on the parties to "continue to seek a peaceful and durable solution to the conflict."
Canada	On 9 May, Minister of Foreign Affairs, Marc Garneau, called for "immediate de-escalation of tensions and for all sides to avoid any unilateral actions". He also expressed concern that "recent decisions on settlements, and demolitions and evictions, including in Sheikh Jarrah, would negatively impact livelihoods and undermine the prospects for a two-state solution".
Chile	The Ministry of Foreign Affairs expressed its "deep concern over escalating violence" and said (without referring to any side) that "Any action whose indiscriminate target is the civilian population is unjustifiable, seriously infringes against humanitarian law, and deserves the total repudiation of the international community", and called for a ceasefire.
China	On 12 May, China's special envoy on the Middle East, Zhai Jun, had expressed "deep concern" over clashes between Palestinians and Israel and "urged all parties to exercise restraint to avoid further casualties". It will also push for United Nations Security Council to take action on the situation in East Jerusalem. On 12 May, Ministry of Foreign Affairs Spokesperson Hua Chunying has called on the UNSC to take actions to help ease the ongoing tensions between Palestine and Israel. It also condemns violence against civilians and calls on all parties to "take actions that are conducive to easing tensions" and "promote the restoration of peace and stability".
Czech Republic	On May 14, President of Czech Republic and long-term support of Israel, Miloš Zeman, hang out flag of Israel in solidarity with State of Israel. Opposition coalition SPOLU called Prague Mayor Zdeněk Hřib, also to hang out flag of Israel.
Egypt	On 9 May, the Ministry of Foreign Affairs said Israel "must stop all measures that violate the sanctity of the Al-Aqsa Mosque" and asserted that potential evictions were a violation of international law. On 11 May, the Minister of Foreign Affairs, Sameh Shoukry, told an emergency meeting of the Arab League that Egypt had reached out to Israel with an offer to mediate, but had not received the "necessary response".
France	On 10 May, a spokeswoman for the Ministry of Europe and Foreign Affairs called for "all concerned to show the greatest restraint and refrain from any provocation to allow a return to calm as swiftly as possible".
Germany	On 10 May, Minister for Foreign Affairs, Heiko Maas, told reporters in Brussels that "we can only call on all sides to deescalate this truly explosive situation" and "both sides can contribute to this". He added that both Israeli and Palestinian authorities "have a duty to prevent further civilian casualties".
Holy See	On 9 May, Pope Francis called for peace and an end to clashes in Jerusalem during his Regina caeli address.
Hungary	On 12 May, Minister of Foreign Affairs and Trade, Péter Szijjártó wrote on Facebook that "Hungary condemns in the strongest terms the latest missile attacks against Israeli cities carried out by various Palestinian terror groups. We demonstrate our full solidarity with Israel and recognise her right to self-defense. The senseless and indiscriminate violence against civilians must stop immediately."
India	On 11 May, India's Permanent Representative to the UN Ambassador T.S. Tirumurti tweeted that India is "deeply concerned at clashes & violence in Temple Mount" and the evictions in Sheikh Jarrah and Silwan. He also condemned the Hamas rocket attacks from Gaza and urged all parties to immediately convene for peace talks. On 17 May, in a statement to the United Nations Security Council, Tirumuti reiterated India's support to the 'just Palestinian cause' and its 'unwavering commitment towards the two-state solution' On 12 May, BJP Member of Parliament Tejasvi Surya tweeted for Israel to "stay strong". BJP spokesman of Chandigarh, Gaurav Goel, was also reported to have been regularly tweeting in support of Israel.
Indonesia	On 10 May, President Joko Widodo condemned the Israeli police raid on the Al-Aqsa Mosque and urged the United Nations Security Council to "take measures". He added that "Indonesia will continue to stand with the people of Palestine".
Iran	On 7 May, the Supreme Leader of Iran, Ali Khamenei, said "Zionists understand nothing but the language of force," described the Israeli police raid on the Al-Aqsa Mosque as "malicious behavior". On 9 May, The Guardian reported that Iranian officials had called on the United Nations to condemn the actions of the Israeli police, describing them as a "war crime". On 11 May, the Minister of Foreign Affairs, Mohammad Javad Zarif, said that the raid on Al-Aqsa was "the largest evidence of the racist, criminal nature of the usurping entity that was always the primary cause of insecurity and instability in this region".
Iraq	The Ministry of Foreign Affairs affirmed "the solidarity of the Iraqi government and people with the people of Jerusalem, calling for an end to hostile attacks on the safe." And renewed Iraq's "firm and principled position on the Palestinian cause, which was and remains a pivotal issue."
Ireland	On 10 May, Minister for Foreign Affairs Simon Coveney condemned the brutal response of the Israeli security services, calling it "completely unacceptable". On 11 May, Leader of the Opposition Mary Lou McDonald said the attacks on Palestine were "wholesale flouting of international law by (the) Israeli state". The same day, Israel's envoy to Ireland was also summoned to lodge an official protest. On 13 May, Tánaiste Leo Varadkar described Israel's attacks against Gaza as "indefensible and unacceptable", going on to say that "annexation, expulsion, plantation and the killing of civilians, deliberately or in terms of collateral damage, is not the behaviour of a democratic state in the 21st century and it is simply unacceptable that such a state or any state should behave in this way".
Japan	On 12 May, State Minister of Defense Yasuhide Nakayama expressed support for Israel, tweeting "Israel has the right to protect itself from terrorists."
Jordan	On 9 May, the Ministry of Foreign Affairs condemned the Israeli police raid on Al-Aqsa as barbaric and summoned the Israeli ambassador to Jordan, Amir Weissbrod, to lodge an official protest. Jordanian news outlets reported that King Abdullah II expressed his support for the Palestinian people and condemned the Israeli actions in a phone call with Mahmoud Abbas.
Malaysia	On 8 May, Minister of Foreign Affairs, Datuk Seri Hishammuddin Hussein, condemned Israeli police actions at Al-Aqsa Mosque. Prime Minister Muhyiddin Yassin likewise "strongly condemned" Israel, calling for Israel to "immediately cease its aggression".
Malta	On 11 May, the Ministry for Foreign and European Affairs issued a statement that called for the cessation of violence, expressed condolences to families of victims, and recognised "the right of the Palestinians not to be deprived of their homes in East Jerusalem". The Ministry reiterated its support for a two-state solution.
Mexico	On 10 May, the Secretariat of Foreign Affairs expressed through its official Twitter account "grave concern" over the rising violence in Jerusalem, Gaza, and other territories throughout Israel and Palestine. It called for a de-escalation from all parties to prevent further harm on civilian population.
Morocco	On 9 May, Voice of America reported that King Mohammed VI had expressed "deep concern" over the violence in Jerusalem.
Namibia	On 10 May, the Namibian government, through its Ministry of International Relations, said that it "condemns the violence exercised by the Israeli police [...] against Palestinian demonstrators and the storming of the Al-Aqsa Mosque, assaulting peaceful worshippers".
New Zealand	On 11 May, Minister of Foreign Affairs, Nanaia Mahuta, called on Israel to "cease demolitions and evictions" and for "both sides to halt steps which undermine prospects for a two state solution". On 17 May, Prime Minister Jacinda Ardern "condemned both the indiscriminate rocket fire we have seen from Hamas and what looks to be a response that has gone well beyond self-defence on both sides." She also stated that Israel had the "right to exist" but Palestinians also had a "right to a peaceful home, a secure home."
Oman	On 8 May, the Foreign Ministry of Oman, condemned the Israeli police actions at Al-Aqsa Mosque and "policies and procedures leading to the displacement of the brotherly Palestinian people from their homes in the city of Jerusalem". The Ministry reiterated its support for an independent Palestinian state along the 1967 borders with East Jerusalem as the capital.
Pakistan	On 9 May, the Prime Minister, Imran Khan, condemned the Israeli police actions at Al-Aqsa Mosque, stating that such actions violated "all norms of humanity and [international] law". Minister of Foreign Affairs, Shah Mahmood Qureshi also condemned the police actions at the Al-Aqsa Mosque, adding that "such brutality is against [the] very spirit of humanity and human rights law". On 12 May, Khan reiterated his position on the conflict by posting a tweet stating "I am PM of Pakistan and #WeStandWithGaza #WeStandWithPalestine", including a screenshot of a quote attributed to Noam Chomsky from 2012 critiquing the Israeli response to the Israeli–Palestinian conflict.
Philippines	On 12 May, the Department of Foreign Affairs released a statement raising "concern" on the escalation of violence in parts of Jerusalem and the Gaza Strip, and likewise urged all parties to exercise restraint and seek dialogue to de-escalate tensions and avoid further actions that could affect future Israeli–Palestinian peace negotiations. The country's embassy in Tel Aviv is also preparing plans to move out about 100 out of 300 Filipinos in Ashdod and Ashkelon to safer ground. The Philippines suspended the deployment of migrant workers to Israel on 20 May.
Poland	On 10 May, Polish Ministry of Foreign Affairs issued a statement, in which Polish state expresses great concern over the escalation of violence in East Jerusalem. The Ministry urged all parties involved, to take immediate actions leading to easing the tensions and restrain from confrontational rhetoric. The Ministry definitely condemned acts of violence in Gaza Strip and West Bank and expressed concern over the risk of eviction of Palestinian families from the Sheikh Jarrah district. Officials opposed any unilateral steps which contribute in heightening tensions which in turn delay the prospect of a peaceful solution of the Israeli–Palestinian conflict and urged to resume constructive dialogue.
Russia	On 8 May, Russian officials expressed "deep concern" and strongly condemned "attacks against civilians". Officials also called on "all parties to refrain from any steps fraught with the escalation of violence".
Saudi Arabia	On 8 May, the Ministry of Foreign Affairs issued a statement that the kingdom "rejects Israel's plans and measures to evict dozens of Palestinians from their homes in Jerusalem and impose Israeli sovereignty over them".
South Africa	On 10 May, President Cyril Ramaphosa said that the ANC condemned "in the strongest possible terms" the potential evictions and the "brutal attacks on Palestinian protesters at Al Aqsa Mosque and the Dome of the Rock".
South Korea	On 13 May, the Ministry of Foreign Affairs issued a statement that expressed concerns over escalating violence and civilian deaths amid military conflict between Israelis and the Palestinians, and called on both sides to refrain from raising tensions and stop using armed forces, as "violence cannot be justified under any circumstances".
Spain	The Ministry of Foreign Affairs urged for Israel to desist from building settlements in the occupied West Bank, concluding "We call on both parties to abstain from any unilateral action and to resume credible dialogue to push on with the efforts to achieve a two-State solution and bring the conflict to an end."
Sudan	On 8 May, the Ministry of Foreign Affairs issued a statement describing Israeli actions in Jerusalem as "repression" and "coercive action". The statement called on the Israeli government to "refrain from taking unilateral steps that diminish the chances for resuming peace negotiations".
Turkey	On 9 May, President Recep Tayyip Erdoğan gave a speech in Ankara describing Israel as a "cruel terrorist state" and calling on the United Nations to intervene to "stop the persecution" of Palestinians.
United Arab Emirates	On 8 May, the Minister of State for Foreign Affairs, Khalifa al-Marar, issued a statement condemning the potential evictions and clashes in Jerusalem. He also called on the Israeli government to "provide necessary protection to Palestinian civilians' right to practice their religion, and to prevent practices that violate the sanctity of the Holy Al-Aqsa Mosque".
United Kingdom	On 10 May, the Foreign Secretary, Dominic Raab, condemned the rocket attacks on Jerusalem and called for "immediate de-escalation on all sides" and an "end to targeting of civilian populations". Leader of the Opposition, Keir Starmer, said that "Israel must respect international law" and called on the Israeli government to work with Palestinian leaders to de-escalate tensions. On 25 May, in an interview with Jacobin magazine, Labour Party leader Jeremy Corbyn urges Israel to end the siege on Gaza.
United States	On 9 May, a representative from the State Department condemned the firing of rockets into Israel from Gaza, followed by a statement from Secretary of State Antony Blinken a day later calling for de-escalation on both sides and expressing concern about rocket attacks into Israel. The State Department also expressed concern about the potential evictions. On 11 May, White House Press Secretary Jen Psaki condemned the rocket attacks into Israel and added that President Biden's support for Israel's "legitimate right to defend itself and its people" is "fundamental and will never waiver". She added that White House personnel had been engaging with Israeli and Palestinian officials and that de-escalation was the White House's primary focus. On 12 May, it was announced that Hady Amr, Deputy Assistant Secretary for Israeli–Palestinian Affairs and Press and Public Diplomacy, would be sent to the region "immediately". On May 16, around 28 U.S. Senate Democrats, led by Jon Ossoff, signed a statement calling for a ceasefire.

=== Other states ===
Country	Response(s)
Republic of China (Taiwan) (Note: For the status of Taiwan, see: De facto and de jure states, Political status of Taiwan, One-China policy, List of sovereign states#Taiwan, and List of states with limited recognition)	On 12 May, Foreign Minister Joseph Wu called for a restoration of peace in the Middle East amid an escalation of fighting between Israeli forces and Palestinian militants.
Northern Cyprus	On 15 May, Prime Minister Ersin Tatar strongly condemned "Israeli attacks against Gaza and condoled with Palestinians", adding he supported and prayed for Palestinians.

== Protests ==
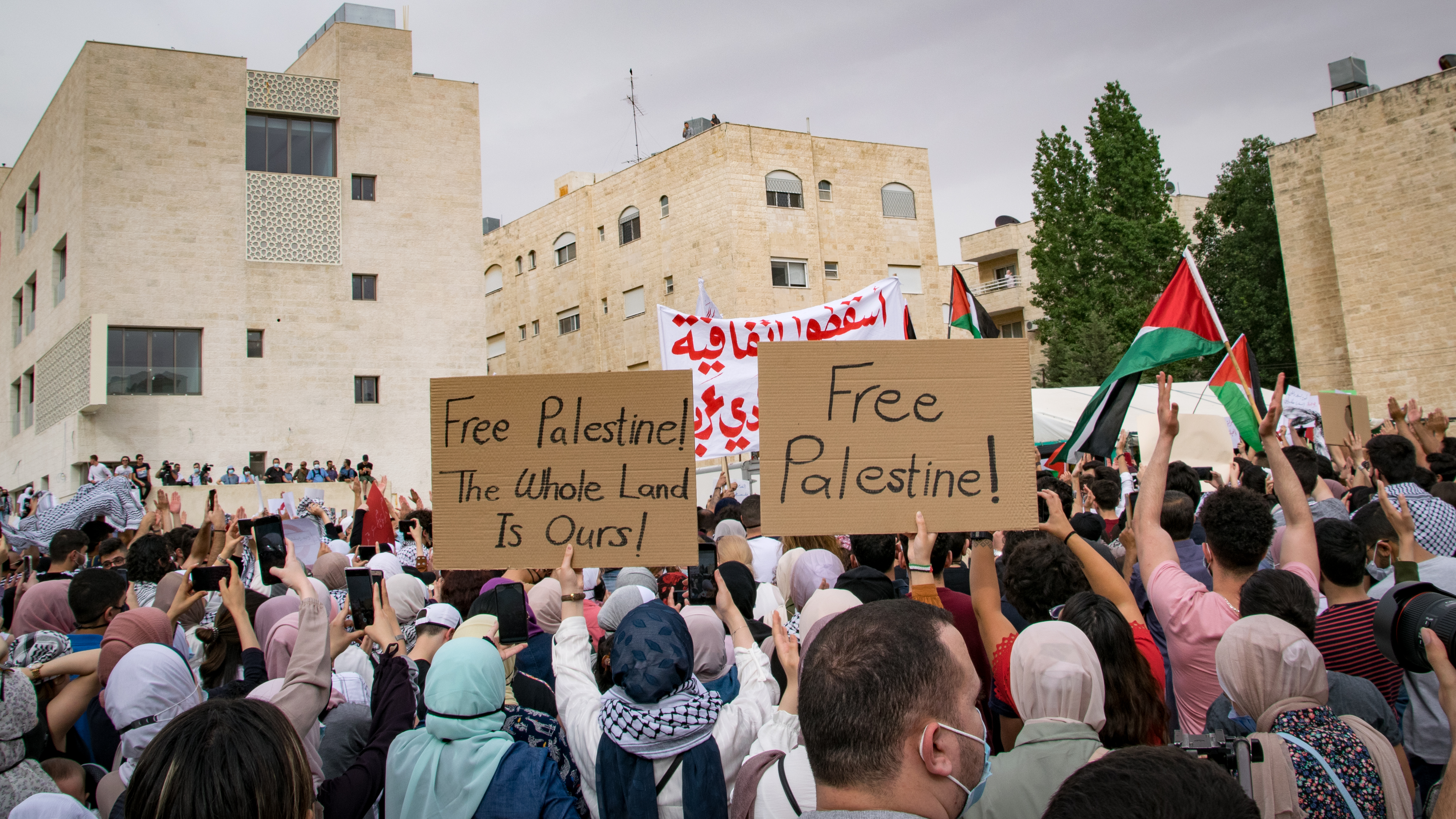
Pro-Palestinian demonstration in Amman, Jordan on 9 May 2021

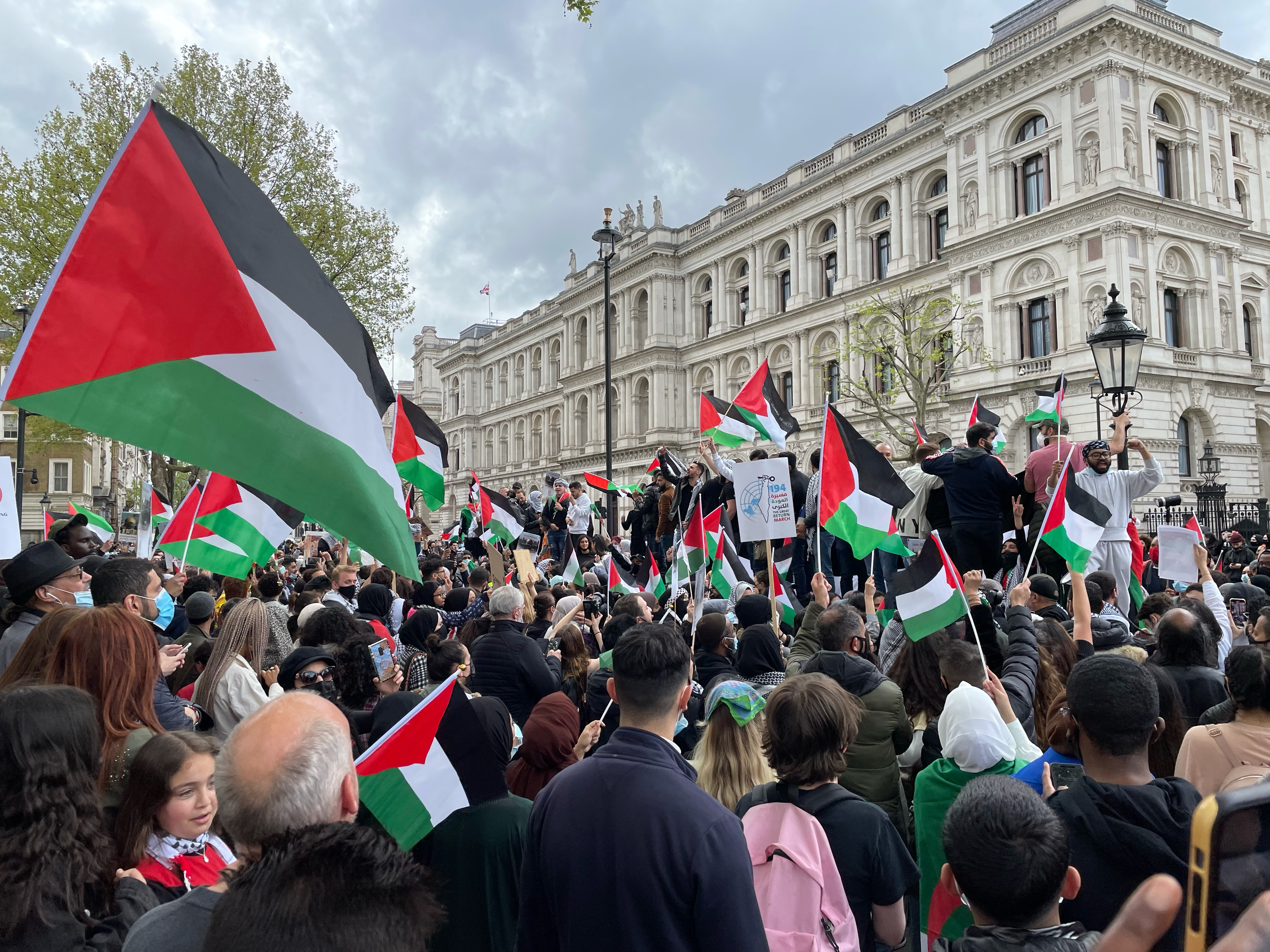
Pro-Palestinian demonstration in London, England on 9 May 2021

- On 9 May, the Muslim Association of Britain organised protests in London, Manchester, Birmingham, and Bradford, in opposition to the potential evictions.
- On 10 May, thousands of Jordanians protested outside the Israeli embassy in Amman.
- On 10 May, thousands of Turks, Syrians, and Palestinians protested outside the Israeli consulate in Istanbul. Protesters gathered in Turkey despite the complete closure due to COVID-19, with Palestinian and Turkish flags in their hands, "Turkish army go to Gaza!" shouted slogans in the form.
- On 11 May, hundreds of South Africans held a pro-Palestinian protest in Cape Town.
- On 11 May, hundreds of protesters held a pro-Palestinian protest in Brighton.
- Pro-Israel and pro-Palestine protesters in Manhattan clashed on 11 May.
- A pro-Palestinian demonstration was held on Constitution Avenue in Washington, D.C., on the afternoon of 11 May.
- The Council on American-Islamic Relations (CAIR) and American Muslims for Palestine organised a pro-Palestinian protest outside the State Department in Washington, D.C., on 11 May. The protest was attended by Representatives Rashida Tlaib and André Carson.
- A British campaign, "Friends of Al-Aqsa", sent at least 45,000 emails to members of parliament, which organizer Ismail Patel said he was "overwhelmed" by and said "demonstrates that the leaders of Britain's main political parties, who have largely kept quiet on the crisis in Jerusalem's Al-Aqsa Mosque and Sheikh Jarrah neighbourhood, are out of touch with public opinion".
- On 15 May, thousands of people attended rallies across Ireland, in Cork, Galway and Dublin, including outside the Israeli Embassy, in support of Palestine.

== Social media ==
- Instagram and Twitter users who had written in support of the Palestinians said their posts had been deleted or their accounts had been suspended. The companies apologized and blamed the situation on a technical glitch.
- A video circulated on social media showing Israelis celebrating at the Western Wall, whilst a tree in the background, at the Al-Aqsa Mosque, was on fire. A large crowd of Israeli Jews gathered around a fire near the mosque on 10 May, chanting yimakh shemam. IfNotNow co-founder Simone Zimmerman criticized them as exhibiting "genocidal animus towards Palestinians — emboldened and unfiltered". The Intercept described the video as "unsettling" and an example of "ultranationalist frenzy". Ayman Odeh, an MK for the Joint List said the video was "shocking". Journalist David Patrikarakos described the video as an example of "fake news", on the grounds that singing and dancing are a part of annual Jerusalem Day celebrations and that the fire was started by Palestinian protesters throwing firecrackers.
- Twitter restricted the account of Palestinian-American journalist Mariam Barghouti, who was reporting on the protests from the West Bank. Barghouti said Twitter asked her to delete some of her tweets. The company later said the account restriction was due to an error.
- Israeli actress Gal Gadot tweeted a statement, which received mixed reactions on Twitter.
- Barbadian singer Rihanna released a statement, asking for protection of both Israeli and Palestinian children, to which she received mixed responses on Twitter.
- American model Bella Hadid streamed herself participating in a pro-Palestine march on Instagram Live, in which she chanted "From the river to the sea, Palestine will be free". The official Israel Twitter account publicly condemned this, posting a screencap of her stream and claiming she advocated for "throwing Jews into the sea".
- Bill Maher defended Israel on his talk show, stating Jews were native inhabitants of that land. He criticized the placement of Palestinian military posts in the middle of civil areas. He also criticized Bella Hadid and reminded her that Palestinian authorities had just passed a rule requiring women to ask their male guardians for authorization to travel.
- Mark Ruffalo shared a petition by calling for international leaders to impose sanctions on key Israeli industries “until Palestinians are granted full and equal civil rights”. The petition eventually garnered over 1.7 million signatures.

== Airlines ==
On May 12, American Airlines, United Airlines, and Delta Air Lines suspended their flights to Israel.
