= American International School in Gaza =

School in Gaza Strip, Palestine

Coordinates: 31°33′39″N 34°28′51″E

- المدرسة الأميركية الدولية في غزة
- Beit Lahia, Gaza; Palestine

Information
- Type: Private
- Established: 1999
- Gender: Co-educational
- Website: www.aisg.ps

American International School in Gaza (Arabic: المدرسة الأميركية الدولية في غزة) is a school located in Gaza, Palestine.

The school opened in 1999. Islamic fundamentalists criticized the school's coeducational classes and had attacked the school including bombing, looting and kidnapping. In 2009, the school held a summer camp and planned to hold autumn classes even though the campus had been bombed by Israel Defense Forces during the First Gaza War. According to the IDF, the school was used by militants to launch rocket attacks but the school officials and local residents denied this.

== Notable people ==
- Plestia Alaqad, journalist
- Hind Khoudary, journalist
- Saint Levant, singer
