= Wael Al-Dahdouh =

Palestinian journalist (born 1970)

- وائل الدحدوح
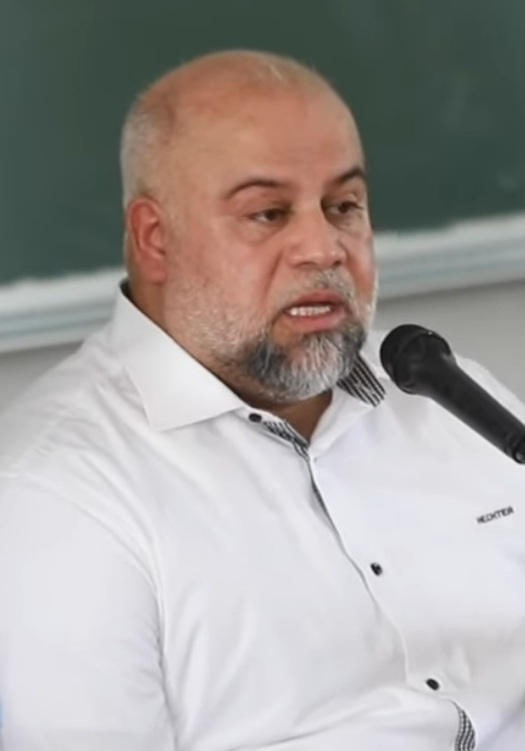
- Dahdouh in May 2024
- Born: Wael Hamdan Ibrahim Al-Dahdouh; 30 April 1970 (age 56); Gaza City
- Other name: Abu Hamza
- Education: Islamic University of Gaza; Al-Quds University
- Occupation: Journalist
- Employer: Al Jazeera
- Awards: Peace Through Media Award (2013)

Wael Hamdan Ibrahim Al-Dahdouh (Arabic: وائل حمدان إبراهيم الدحدوح, romanized: Wāʾil Ḥamdān Ibrāhīm al-Daḥdūḥ; born 30 April 1970) is a Palestinian journalist and the bureau chief of Al Jazeera in Gaza City.

His career, beginning in 1998, also spanned working for Al-Quds newspaper, acting as a correspondent for Voice of Palestine, in the Second Intifada against the Israeli occupation, and as a correspondent for Al Arabiya, with his role with Al-Jazeera starting in 2004. He received the Peace Through Media Award in 2013.

Numerous members of Al-Dahdouh's family have been killed by the Israeli military during the Gaza war. His wife, seven-year-old daughter, and 15-year-old son were killed in an Israeli airstrike on the Nuseirat refugee camp on 28 October 2023, in addition to eight of his other relatives. On 15 December 2023, while Al-Dahdouh and his cameraman Samer Abu Daqqa were covering the Haifa School airstrike in Khan Yunis, they were hit by an Israeli missile, injuring Dahdouh and fatally wounding Abu Daqqa. Despite the death of many family members and his injury, he quickly returned to reporting on the war after both incidents. His son, journalist Hamza al-Dahdouh, was killed by an Israeli airstrike in Khan Yunis on 7 January 2024, and two of his nephews were killed in an airstrike the following day.

On 11 November 2024, the National Press Club announced him as the 2024 International John Aubuchon Press Freedom Award winner, the highest honor for press freedom from National Press Club.

== Biography ==
Wael Hamdan Al-Dahdouh was born on 30 April 1970 in the Zaytoun neighborhood, the oldest neighborhood of Gaza City in the Israeli-occupied Gaza Strip. He grew up in a well-off Gazan family who originally came from the Arabian Peninsula. He has eight siblings. He received his primary and secondary education in several schools in Gaza City.

In 1988, Al-Dahdouh earned his high school diploma and was given a scholarship to study medicine in Iraq, but the start of the First Intifada in 1987 prevented him from leaving. He was arrested by the Israeli army and charged with stone-throwing, with a sentence of 15 years in prison. Al-Dahdouh spent seven years in Israeli prisons. He again obtained a high school diploma in an Israeli prison, and received a BA in journalism and media from the Islamic University of Gaza in 1998. After Israel prevented him from traveling to study abroad, he received a master's degree in regional studies from Al-Quds University, Abu Dis, in 2007.

In December 2023, Al-Dahdouh's right arm was badly injured in an Israeli drone strike while he was reporting on an Israeli attack on the Khan Yunis refugee camp. At the request of the Egyptian Journalists' Syndicate in Cairo, Al-Dahdouh was granted permission to evacuate to Egypt via the Rafah Crossing and then Doha via Al-Arish Airport for medical treatment on 16 and 17 January 2024. Four of his children had crossed to Egypt the week prior. Al-Dahdouh subsequently spent four months receiving treatment in Berlin.

As of February 2025, Al-Dahdouh lives in Doha, Qatar.

== Career ==
Al-Dahdouh started working as a journalist in 1998. He worked for the Palestinian newspaper Al-Quds as a correspondent in Gaza, and wrote for other Palestinian magazines, then worked as a correspondent for the radio Voice of Palestine, as well as for Sahar satellite channel at the beginning of the Second Intifada in 2000. He also worked as a correspondent for Al Arabiya in 2003, then moved to work as a reporter and official at Al Jazeera's office in the Gaza Strip since 2004.

=== Killings of family and colleagues ===
Al-Dahdouh was broadcasting live during the Gaza war when he learned that several of his family members had been killed in an Israeli airstrike in October 2023. His wife, his daughter Sham (aged 7), his son Mahmoud (aged 15), and a grandchild were killed, along with 21 other people. They were residing in Nuseirat refugee camp in the Gaza Strip. They had moved there following a warning from Israel to evacuate from the north of Gaza. His other son, Yehia, was seriously wounded, and Al Jazeera reported that at least eight of his other relatives were also killed in the air raid. In video footage uploaded by Gaza photojournalist Motaz Azaiza, Al-Dahdouh is seen holding his deceased grandson while three relatives mourn. When he saw his dead son, Al-Dahdouh stated, "They took revenge on us through our children."

On 15 December 2023, while Dahdouh and his colleague cameraman Samer Abu Daqqa were covering the Haifa School airstrike in Khan Yunis, they were hit by an Israeli missile. Dahdouh was evacuated and treated for shrapnel injuries, but Abu Daqqa, who was seriously wounded, was unreachable as Israeli forces prevented ambulances from reaching him; he bled to death many hours later. Despite the death of many family members and his injury, Al-Dahdouh quickly returned to reporting on the war after both incidents.

A surviving son, journalist Hamza al-Dahdouh, was killed by an Israeli airstrike alongside colleague Mustafa Thuraya in Khan Younis on 7 January 2024. Hamza was 27, and was Dahdouh's eldest son. The IDF bombed Hamza's car because Thuraya had been using a camera drone to film the aftermath of an earlier airstrike, stating they had "struck a terrorist who operated an aircraft that posed a threat". Al Jazeera condemned the attack as an assassination and alleged that the IDF has "systematically targeted" Dahdouh's family. The IDF claimed that Hamza was an operative of PIJ. The accusation was not independently verified and was rejected by the families of Hamza and Mustafa, as well as by Al Jazeera who described it as "false" and a "fabrication". One other journalist was seriously injured in the bombing. The day after the airstrike, two of Wael al-Dahdouh's nephews—brothers Ahmed al-Dahdouh, 30, and Muhammad al-Dahdouh, 26—along with a third man were killed when their car was bombed.

== Awards and honors ==
- International John Aubuchon Press Freedom Award (2024) by the National Press Club
- Peace Through Media Award (2013) by the International Media Awards in London

== See also ==
- Bisan Owda
- Plestia Alaqad
- History of Palestinian journalism
