= Plestia Alaqad =

Palestinian journalist (born 2001)

- بلستيا العقاد
- Born: 10 December 2001 (age 24); Gaza Strip, Palestine
- Education: Eastern Mediterranean University
- Occupations: Journalist; writer; poet
- Years active: 2023–present
- Known for: Documenting the Gaza war on social media
- Notable work: The Eyes of Gaza: A Diary of Resilience (2025)

Plestia Alaqad (Arabic: بلستيا العقاد, romanized: Blistiyā al-ʿAqqād; born 10 December 2001) is a Palestinian author, journalist, and poet. She gained international attention for her daily coverage of the Gaza war by way of her social media accounts.

In November 2023, as the Israeli invasion of the Gaza Strip intensified, Alaqad and her family fled to Egypt and then to Australia, where she continued her advocacy on the Israeli–Palestinian conflict.

== Early life and education ==
Alaqad was born on 10 December 2001 and grew up in the Gaza Strip. She has an older brother and a younger sister. Her mother is the former head of the American International School in Gaza's middle school. Her father is employed abroad. He gave her the name "Plestia" after the Philistines, a tribe among the first to settle Palestine in antiquity. She attended the American International School in the city of Beit Lahia, and later enrolled at Eastern Mediterranean University in what is de facto Northern Cyprus to study New Media and Journalism, graduating in 2022.

In August 2024, Alaqad won the Shireen Abu Akleh Memorial Scholarship to pursue a Master of Arts (MA) in Media Studies at the American University of Beirut in Lebanon.

== Career ==
Alaqad previously worked as a human resources professional at a marketing agency while gathering a small online following on Instagram in her free time. She regularly conducted media training as well, in addition to engaging in freelance journalism. Prior to the Gaza war, Alaqad's online content mainly consisted of travel content, covering locations like Cyprus and Turkey.

=== Outbreak of the Israel–Gaza war ===
A recent graduate of Eastern Mediterranean University, Alaqad was due to start a new job on 8 October 2023. However, on 7 October 2023, the Hamas-led attack on Israel triggered what would become the deadliest war of the Arab–Israeli conflict. Shortly after the Israeli government declared that it was imposing a "total blockade" on the Gaza Strip, Alaqad began documenting the effects of the Israeli bombardment campaign and posted the video diaries to her Instagram account. By November 3, she had accumulated 2.1 million followers on Instagram, and that figure doubled by 22 November. Alaqad's videos have been shared by the Australian Broadcasting Corporation, the British Broadcasting Corporation, Business Today, The Independent, The New York Times, PBS NewsHour, and The Washington Post. She was also interviewed by the GB News Breakfast Show for an inquiry on how Gazans' lives had been affected by the war.

In light of the intensity of the Israeli military's offensive and the high Palestinian death toll accompanying it, Alaqad has accused Israel of waging a genocidal war against the Palestinian people. She has also stated that her experiences with the Israel–Hamas war have driven her to understand her late grandfather's emotions towards the 1948 Palestinian expulsion and flight, which is known as the Nakba in Palestinian society.

=== Since leaving the Gaza Strip ===
On 22 November 2023, roughly one month into the Israeli invasion of the Gaza Strip, Alaqad and her family fled to Egypt via the Rafah Border Crossing and then, a few days later, to Australia, having secured visas via her uncle. In a later video, Alaqad, residing in Melbourne, explained that she chose to leave the Gaza Strip because she feared that her journalism was putting her family in immediate danger.

In February 2024, Alaqad took part in the Bankstown Poetry Slam in the city of Sydney, where she presented poetry that she had written about the war in her diary while she was in the Gaza Strip.

== Writing ==
Alaqad has written several articles for The Guardian. and ITV.

=== The Eyes of Gaza (2025) ===
In a six-way auction, Pan Macmillan won the rights to publish Alaqad's debut book The Eyes of Gaza, a series of diary extracts, in 2025.

== Awards and honours ==
In December 2024, Plestia Alaqad was included on the BBC's 100 Women list, and shared Amnesty International Australia's inaugural Human Rights Defender Award with Palestinian journalists Bisan Owda, Anas Al-Sharif, and Ahmed Shihab-Eldin.

== Bibliography ==
- Alaqad, Plestia (2025). The Eyes of Gaza: A Diary of Resilience. Little, Brown and Company.

== See also ==
- Motaz Azaiza
- Bisan Owda
- Wael Al-Dahdouh
- History of Palestinian journalism
