= Bankstown Poetry Slam =

Poetry slam in Australia

The Bankstown Poetry Slam is the largest regular poetry slam in Australia that has been drawing increasingly diverse audiences from around Sydney since it started in Bankstown in 2013. BPS has become a literary institution in western Sydney with 200-300 people regularly attending their volunteer-run monthly slams at the Bankstown Arts Centre.

== History ==
The Bankstown Poetry Slam (BPS) was founded in 2013 by Sara Mansour and Ahmad Al Rady, and held in the southwest Sydney suburb of Bankstown. Since its inception, the poetry slam has featured notable poets such as Omar Musa, Luka Lesson, Jazz Money, Rupi Kaur and Rudy Francisco. It has held grand slams at the Art Gallery of New South Wales, Sydney Town Hall, and The Sydney ICC.

The Bankstown Poetry Slam is currently run by Sara Mansour, Bilal Hafda, and Yasmine Lewis.

In 2018, security guards were hired for the event after comments from Australian politician Mark Latham incited online threats and abuse against attendees.

In 2022, BPS organised the Brave New Word Poetry Festival, bringing poetry to nine suburbs across western Sydney. More than 50 participants had the opportunity to workshop poems with prominent international spoken word artists.

At their annual Grand Slam in 2024, BPS hosted Plestia Alaqad, a Palestinian journalist who rose to social media fame from their footage of the devastation of their home city during the Israeli bombardment of Gaza. Many of the event guests and performers were wearing Palestinian kheffiye in solidarity with Alaqad. Writer and lawyer Sara M. Saleh was one of the judges and the winning acts (ARAB, AI, and Halal Collab) shared a prize of $8,000 AUD between them.

== Awards and recognition ==
- In May 2023, BPS won the 'Special Award' (and with it $10,000) at the Premier's Literary Award ceremony. Mansour, Hafda, and Lewis were all present to accept the award.
