= Motaz Azaiza =

Palestinian photojournalist (born 1999)

- معتز هلال عزايزة
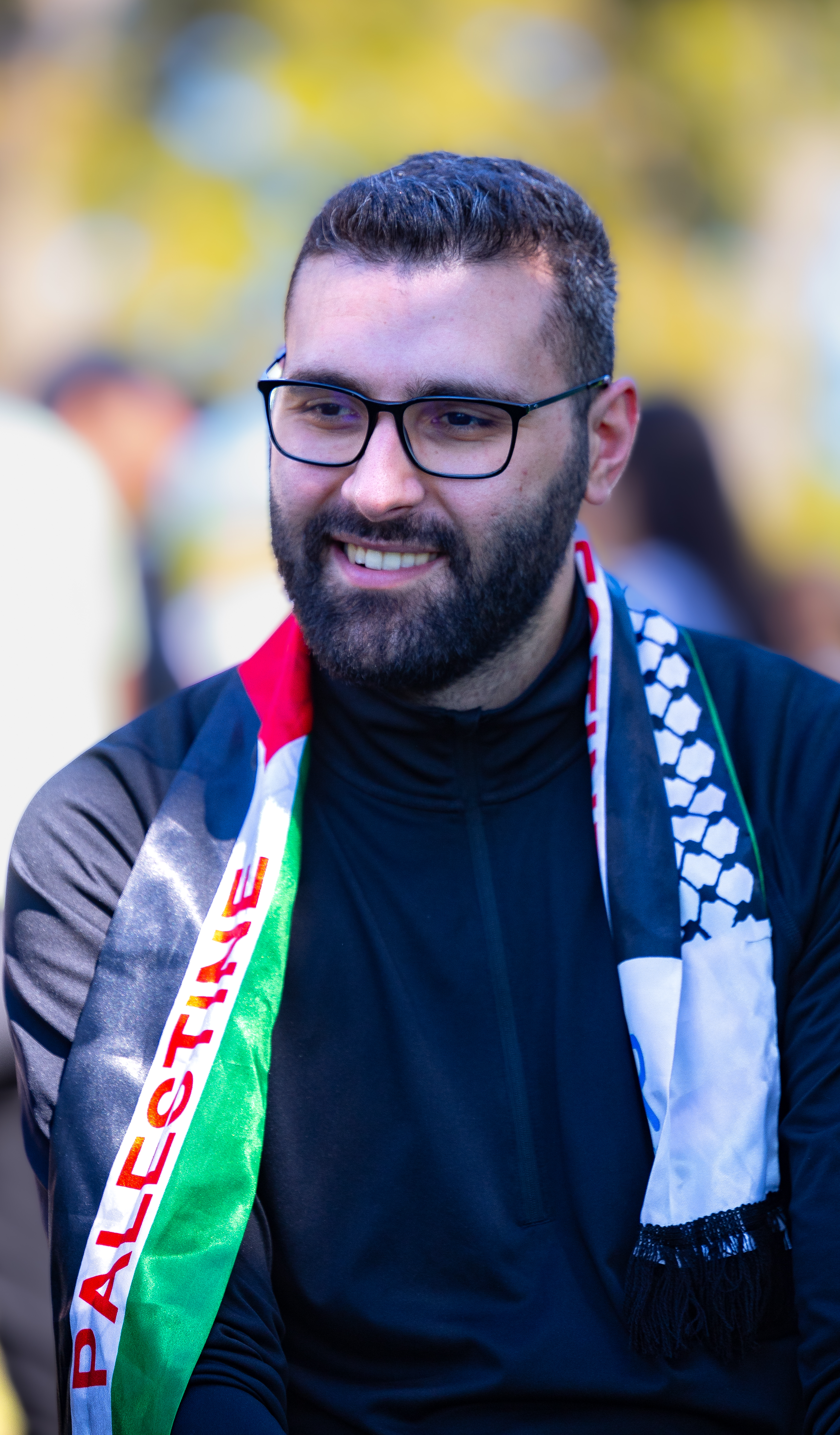
- Azaiza attending UNRWA's USA's Gaza 5k fundraising event in Dallas on 28 September 2024
- Born: Motaz Hilal Azaiza; 30 January 1999 (age 27); Deir al-Balah, Gaza Strip
- Education: Al-Azhar University
- Occupation: Photojournalist
- Years active: 2014–present
- Employer: UNRWA
- Known for: Documenting the Gaza–Israel conflict on social media

Motaz Hilal Azaiza (Arabic: معتز هلال عزايزة; born 30 January 1999) is a Palestinian photojournalist from Gaza. He is known for covering the Gaza war, drawing a large social media following. In 2023, he was named Man of the Year by GQ Middle East and one of his photos, showing a girl trapped in rubble from an Israeli air strike, was named one of Time's top 10 photos of 2023, and was featured on Time's list of the 100 most influential people of 2024.

== Early life and education ==
Azaiza was raised in the Deir al-Balah Camp in the then-Israeli-occupied Gaza Strip. He attended Al-Azhar University in Gaza, graduating in 2021 with a degree in English studies. As of 2023, he was employed by UNRWA.

== Career ==
=== Early career ===
Prior to the Gaza war, Azaiza's online posts mostly focused on photographing daily life in his native Gaza Strip. He told The Guardian he did not intend to become a war journalist and wished "people knew me for my art, I wanted to capture the beauty of my people". His dream was to become a travel photographer according to Grazia UK, but he could not yet afford the visa expenses. Although he covered the 2014 Gaza War and the 2021 Israel–Palestine crisis, his social media accounts did not gain much attention at the time. There are few foreign journalists in the Gaza Strip due to Israel and Egypt denying them access to the territory, which has led to Azaiza becoming a key reporter on the ground in Gaza.

=== 2023–present ===
Before the Hamas-led attack on Israel on 7 October 2023, Azaiza's profile on Instagram had approximately 25,000 followers. On 13 October, his Instagram account was restricted, but access was restored the following day. His follower count had increased to one million by 17 October, nine million by October 30, 12.5 million by November 3, and 13 million by November 7. As of 27 December, Azaiza's Instagram profile had 17.5 million followers, with the number reaching over 18 million by January 2024.

In January 2024, Azaiza appeared on Mehdi Hasan's final show with MSNBC to discuss the dangers of reporting from Gaza under Israel's bombardment. Later that month, after 108 days of reporting, Azaiza and some of his family evacuated to Egypt and then Doha, Qatar via Al-Arish Airport, their first time on a plane. Azaiza subsequently began meeting with ministers, diplomats, and media figures to share his accounts, frustrated that his attempts to broadcast what was happening in Gaza had not changed things.

On his first civilian flight, Azaiza flew to Istanbul on 26 February 2024, beginning his travels to "show, tell and speak more". He then went to Geneva, Switzerland on 8 March for the FIFDH, appearing on a panel with Farah Nabulsi and Mohamed Jabaly at the premiere of Jabaly's film Life is Beautiful. Azaiza visited American universities for talks in April, including a Committee to Protect Journalists (CPJ) panel, and went to London in May, where he joined protests and gave a speech on Nakba Day.

In August, English band Massive Attack invited Azaiza to speak on stage at their Bristol concert, which garnered an audience of over 30 thousand. He also paid visit to Derry, where he was welcomed by mayor Lilian Seenoi-Barr and interviewed by actress Jamie-Lee O'Donnell. In September, he featured on the BBC News programme HARDTalk.

In an interview with journalist Ahmed Bikaoui published in September 2026, Azaiza said that he had recorded crowds abusing Israeli hostages in Gaza on 7 October, but refrained from publishing the videos for fear that Israeli forces would identify and kill individuals depicted in his footage. He said a proposal that included disarmament of Hamas had been on the table around 11 October and that it could have prevented the loss of lives in Gaza. He criticized Hamas for its conduct in the war, saying that "From 7 October until today, show me one Palestinian in Gaza who was protected by Hamas's weapons. No one."

In the same interview he said he had been in a Hamas-affiliated Whatsapp group called Smart which included Hamas media people and Gazan journalists. He left the group after being attacked and insulted there.

== Personal life ==
On 11 October 2023, at least 15 of Azaiza's relatives were killed in an Israeli airstrike on the Deir al-Balah Camp, shortly after the outbreak of the Gaza war.

In a February 2024 interview with The Guardian, Azaiza mentioned the traumatic flashbacks and feelings of guilt and hopelessness he experienced after leaving Gaza.

== Accolades ==
In November 2023, GQ Middle East named Azaiza their Man of the Year, with editor Ahmad Ali Swaid stating that "he reminds us that no matter who we are or where we're from, it's us – ordinary people, men, and women – who have the power to enact that very change that we want to see."

Azaiza's photograph, "Seeing Her Through My Camera", part of his extensive coverage of Gaza during the Gaza war, was listed among Time's top 10 photos of 2023. In late October, following an Israeli airstrike, Azaiza used a low shutter speed on his camera to capture the moment, revealing a young girl trapped under rubble at the Al Nusairat refugee camp. This technique allowed him to witness her in the darkness where the naked eye couldn't confirm her condition before a Civil Defense rescue worker's light illuminated her face.

After arriving in Istanbul in February 2024, Azaiza accepted his 2023 TRT World Citizen Award.

Azaiza was featured on Time's list of the 100 most influential people of 2024 in April. In June, Azaiza was awarded the Freedom Prize in Normandy, France. Azaiza was one of four Palestinian journalists to be nominated for the 2024 Nobel Peace Prize.

== See also ==
- Bisan Owda
- Wael Al-Dahdouh
- Plestia Alaqad
- Killing of journalists in the Gaza war
- History of Palestinian journalism
