= Mireille Eid (Astore) =

Lebanese artist, writer (born 1961)

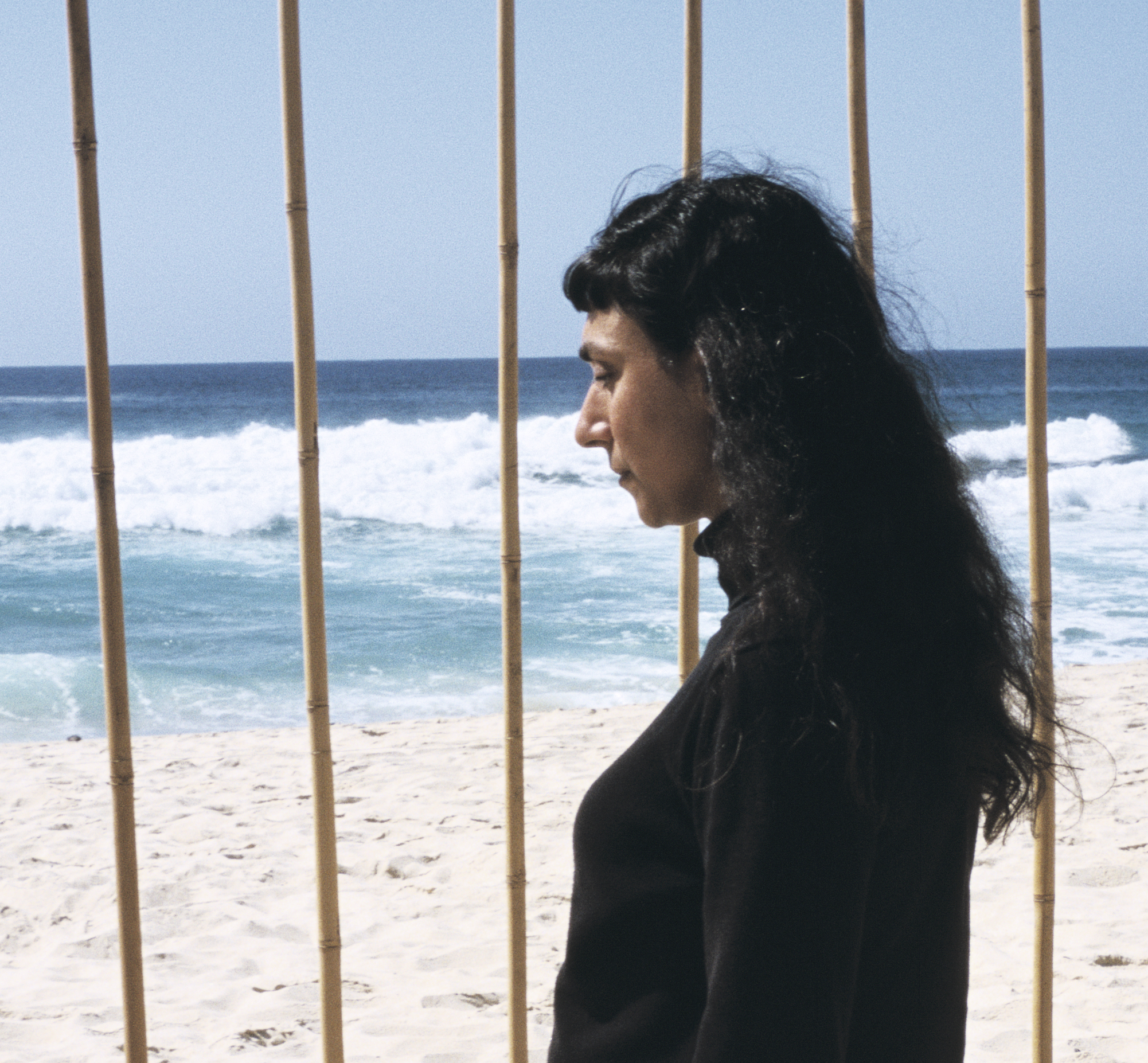
Mireille Eid in Tampa performance

Mireille Eid (Astore) (Beirut, 1961) (Arabic: ميراي عيد اسطوري) is an artist and a writer. She left Beirut during the Lebanese civil war in 1975 to live in Melbourne, Australia. She studied the Sciences at the University of Melbourne where she graduated before becoming a full-time artist and writer. Influenced by continental philosophy, her art draws on autobiographical notions of representation and the unheimlich; where the conscious intersects with the unconscious. Through her art and her writing she "explores human emotions" and "asks what it is to be human". Mireille Eid (Astore) attained a PhD in Contemporary Arts from the University of Western Sydney (2008). She was Research Affiliate (2009–2013) at Sydney College of the Arts, the Visual Arts Faculty of the University of Sydney and Research Fellow (2011–2012) at the American University of Beirut.

== Exhibitions ==
Mireille Eid (Astore)'s artworks have been exhibited and screened at the 2004 Sydney Film Festival; at the Freud Museum – London; at the Millais Gallery – Southampton; at Espace SD – Beirut; the Tate Modern – London; at the Centre Pompidou; the 8th Sharjah Biennial 2008; and the 3rd Guangzhou Triennial. She has exhibited her photomedia artworks at the Conny Dietzschold Multiple Box Gallery – Sydney. In 2003 she won the (Australian) National Photographic Purchase Award.

Of Mireille Eid (Astore)'s Tampa artwork which referenced the MS Tampa Norwegian ship, it was said:

"Just as Benjamin noted the contextual aesthetic consequences of the circulation of photographic images through newspapers and magazines, Astore’s combination of photography with sculpture and performance, circulated via her website, rewrites both photography and the spatial and interpretive dynamics of this installation work.”

A short film directed by Eid that was based on the Tampa work, Tampa: a Walk on the Beach, was screened in Sydney and London.

== Short films ==
After Tampa: a Walk on the Beach, Eid's short film, Not From Here "questions the legitimacy of the original photograph". It has been shown in galleries and film festivals in over 20 countries. Some international screenings include the né à Beyrouth Film Festival in Beirut, the Toronto Arab Film Festival and the CinemaEast Film Festival in New York and the Konstföreningen Aura Gallery in Sweden. Another short film, 3494 Houses + 1 Fence, which juxtaposed images of houses in Australia with scenes from a war damaged fence in Lebanon "create[s] a striking picture of her awareness of the contrasts between her memories and her current life". It was selected to feature in the Women's Cinema from Tangiers to Tehran Film Festival and was included on the third volume of the "Resistance(s)" DVD series.

== Performances ==
Mireille Eid (Astore) gives lecture performances. An Ungrateful Death: Al-Karam in the Age of Withdrawal took place at the 2008 Home Works IV. She gave the keynote address "Speaking on Behalf of the Other" at the 2005 Poetics of Australian Space conference – University of Sydney & Art Gallery of New South Wales, Sydney, and "On Autobiography, Economies of Surplus and Surpassing Disasters" as keynote address at the 2010 International Conference on the Arts in Society Conference. 4'33 in 2010 was delivered at the Silent Spaces Exhibition at the Macquarie University Art Gallery. Her last lecture performance (2011) was “Posthumous Reckonings: A Cosmology of Infinitudes” at the American University of Beirut

== Publications ==
Mireille Eid (Astore)'s artworks, poetry and fictocritical writing are published in: New Vision: Arab Contemporary Art in the 21st Century (Thames and Hudson); Art in the Age of Terrorism (Paul Holberton Publishing & University of Washington Press); Arab Women’s Lives Retold: Exploring Identity Through Writing (Syracuse University Press). In 2008, Mireille Eid (Astore) co-guest edited Artlink Vol 28 no. 1.
