= Mariam Barghouti =

American-born Palestinian writer and journalist (born 1993)

- Born: June 23, 1993 (age 33); Atlanta, Georgia, United States
- Education: Birzeit University (BA); University of Edinburgh (MSc)
- Occupations: Writer, journalist, researcher, activist, commentator, blogger

Mariam Barghouti (born June 23, 1993) is an American-born Palestinian writer, journalist, blogger, researcher, and commentator. She lives in Ramallah.

== Career ==
She obtained a BA degree in English language and English Literature from Birzeit University with a focus on sociolinguistics. She received an MSc degree in Sociology and Global Change from the University of Edinburgh with a focus on Israeli Ashkenazi–Mizrahi racial hierarchies. She is also known for undertaking monitoring and evaluation missions of humanitarian and development aid in countries such as Jordan, Syria, and Lebanon, along with Palestine, a non-member observer state of the UN, and for various governmental as well as non-governmental organisations.

Her political commentary and research work has notably featured in CNN, Al Jazeera English, The Guardian, BBC, Huffington Post, The New York Times, Middle East Monitor, Newsweek, Mondoweiss, International Business Times and TRT World. She has also contributed to various books and anthologies including I found Myself in Palestine. She has also written profiles on Palestinian figures including Palestinian artist Khaled Hourani and Palestinian official and politician Dr. Hanan Ashrawi.

She has commented on media double standards when reporting on Palestine and has written about Israeli violations against Palestinians and the harsh realities and experiences faced by Palestinians under Israeli control. During the 2021 Israel–Palestine crisis, she raised concerns on what she says is Israel's suppression attitude towards Palestine through her work on the ground as a researcher, journalist, and listener.

In May 2021, Twitter restricted her official Twitter account which was reporting on the protests from the West Bank during the 2021 Israel-Palestine crisis, Jerusalem, and Palestinians with Israeli citizenship. Barghouti said Twitter had temporarily suspended some of her tweets on the violence being imposed by Israeli settlers and the Israeli army. The company later said the account restriction was due to an error.
