= Amnesty International Australia =

- Formation: 1962
- Type: Non-governmental Organisation
- Registration no.: 64 002 806 233
- Headquarters: Sydney, Australia
- National Director: Samantha Klintworth (2019– present)
- Chair: Terence Jeyaretnam
- Board of directors: Lisa Annese, Michael Dundon, Ajoy Ghosh, Terence Jeyaretnam, Carole Cooper, Jamie Hodgeson, Sonia di Mezza, Anne Wright
- Parent organization: Amnesty International
- Revenue: AUD $22,407,562 (2023)
- Expenses: AUD $20,980,336 (2023)
- Staff: Approx 65 (nationally)
- Website: www.amnesty.org.au

Amnesty International Australia is a section of the Amnesty International network, and is part of the global movement promoting and defending human rights and dignity.

== Concerns and campaigns ==
Human rights in the Asia-Pacific region is a key concern for Amnesty International Australia. Amnesty International Australia searches out facts about human rights abuses and raises awareness of these abuses in Australia, the Asia-Pacific and around the world. The organisation undertakes advocacy and mobilises people to put pressure on governments and others to end rights violations.

Amnesty International Australia campaigns on international and domestic human rights issues. Past campaigns include calling for an end to the human rights abuses that drive and deepen poverty, through the "Demand Dignity" campaign;

Craig Foster became the face of the "Game Over" (#GameOver) campaign in late 2019, which has been supported by high-profile sportspeople such as Liz Ellis, Benny Elias, Paul Roos, Ian Chappell, Lisa Sthalekar, Paul Wade, Frank Farina, Alex Tobin, Craig Moore; musician Jimmy Barnes, actors Bryan Brown and Anthony La Paglia musicians and many others, and continues as of 2022. Sally McManus, and many others. The campaign centres on the plight of asylum seekers kept in indefinite detention by the Australian Government, for many years after 2013 at detention centres on Manus Island, (PNG), and Nauru.

As of March 2022, campaign focus areas were Indigenous youth incarceration under the campaign name of "Community Is Everything"; fair treatment of refugees and asylum seekers; and gender and sexuality; women's rights; climate justice; anti-racism; taking action for individuals around the world who are in imminent danger; crisis response; calling for the end the death penalty around the world; and protection of health and human rights during the COVID-19 pandemic in Australia.

== Governance and funding ==
The National Board of Amnesty International, which ensures that its constitution is upheld, comprises seven elected directors and up to two additional co-opted directors. As of July 2024 the board is headed by Mario Santos, with directors Lisa Annese, Michael Dundon, Ajoy Ghosh, Terence Jeyaretnam, Belinda Neal, Anne Wright.

In 2018, the organisation introduced new structures and procedures for governance, which increased the impact of members by making more members eligible to vote at the AGM, as well as creating a forum in which members could participate and add their ideas. Membership is broken into seven regions, more or less based on the states and territories of Australia, with each region headed by Activism Leadership Committees.

There are also local groups, with members drawn from universities or local suburbs.

In 2019, National Director Claire Mallinson announced she was stepping down from her role in October after 12 years with the organisation. The Board appointed Samantha Klintworth as National Director, commencing in November 2019. As of July 2024 she remains in this position.

Amnesty International Australia is 100% independent and funded by donors. The organisation does not accept money from governments or political organisations. The 2020 Council comprises a group of leaders in business, philanthropy and the arts to raise the profile of Amnesty in Australia, and help to raise funds. The organisation reported over AUD $22M in revenue in 2023.

== Collaborations ==
- To celebrate International Women's Day on 8 March 2015, Amnesty International Australia collaborated with youth dating app Tinder to raise awareness of women's rights. Slogans included "Not all women have the power to choose like you do" and "You pick your partner. Many women aren't given the choice.".
- Holmesglen Institute of TAFE's Community Services students – presentation by Julian Burnside AO QC in 2018
- In 2019 Amnesty International Australia partnered with The Body Shop and Indigenous artist Emma-Louise Mulganai Hollingsworth to produce a range of gift cards and tags for sale in stores, with proceeds donated to Amnesty.
- Charity Greeting Cards (ongoing as of March 2022)
