= Iphigene Ochs Sulzberger =

American newspaper executive (1892–1990)

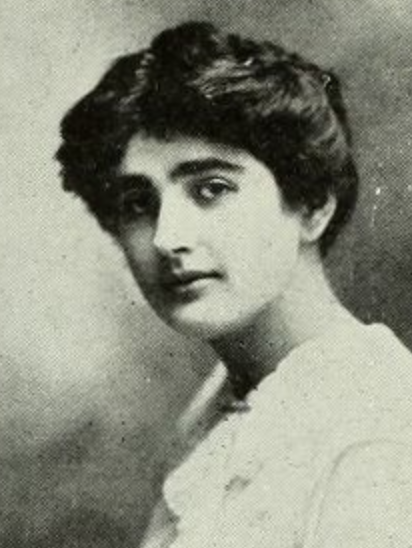
- Ochs in the 1914 yearbook of Barnard College
- Born: Iphigene Bertha Ochs; September 19, 1892; Cincinnati, Ohio, U.S.
- Died: February 26, 1990 (aged 97); Stamford, Connecticut, U.S.
- Education: Barnard College (Bachelor of Arts)
- Occupation: Newspaper executive
- Spouse: Arthur Hays Sulzberger
- Children: Marian Sulzberger Heiskell; Ruth Sulzberger Golden Holmberg; Judith Sulzberger Levinson; Arthur Ochs Sulzberger
- Parent(s): Adolph Simon Ochs; Effie Wise
- Relatives: Isaac Mayer Wise (grandfather); George Oakes (uncle); John Bertram Oakes (cousin); Arthur Ochs Sulzberger Jr. (grandson); Arthur Golden (grandson); A. G. Sulzberger (great-grandson); Ben Dolnick (great-grandson); Sam Dolnick (great-grandson)

Iphigene Bertha Ochs Sulzberger (September 19, 1892 – February 26, 1990) was an American heiress, socialite, newspaper executive, philanthropist and former owner of The New York Times. She was the daughter of Adolph Ochs, wife of Arthur Hays Sulzberger, mother of Arthur Ochs Sulzberger, paternal grandmother of Arthur Ochs Sulzberger Jr., and patrilineal great-grandmother of A. G. Sulzberger, who all served as publishers of the paper.

== Early life and education ==
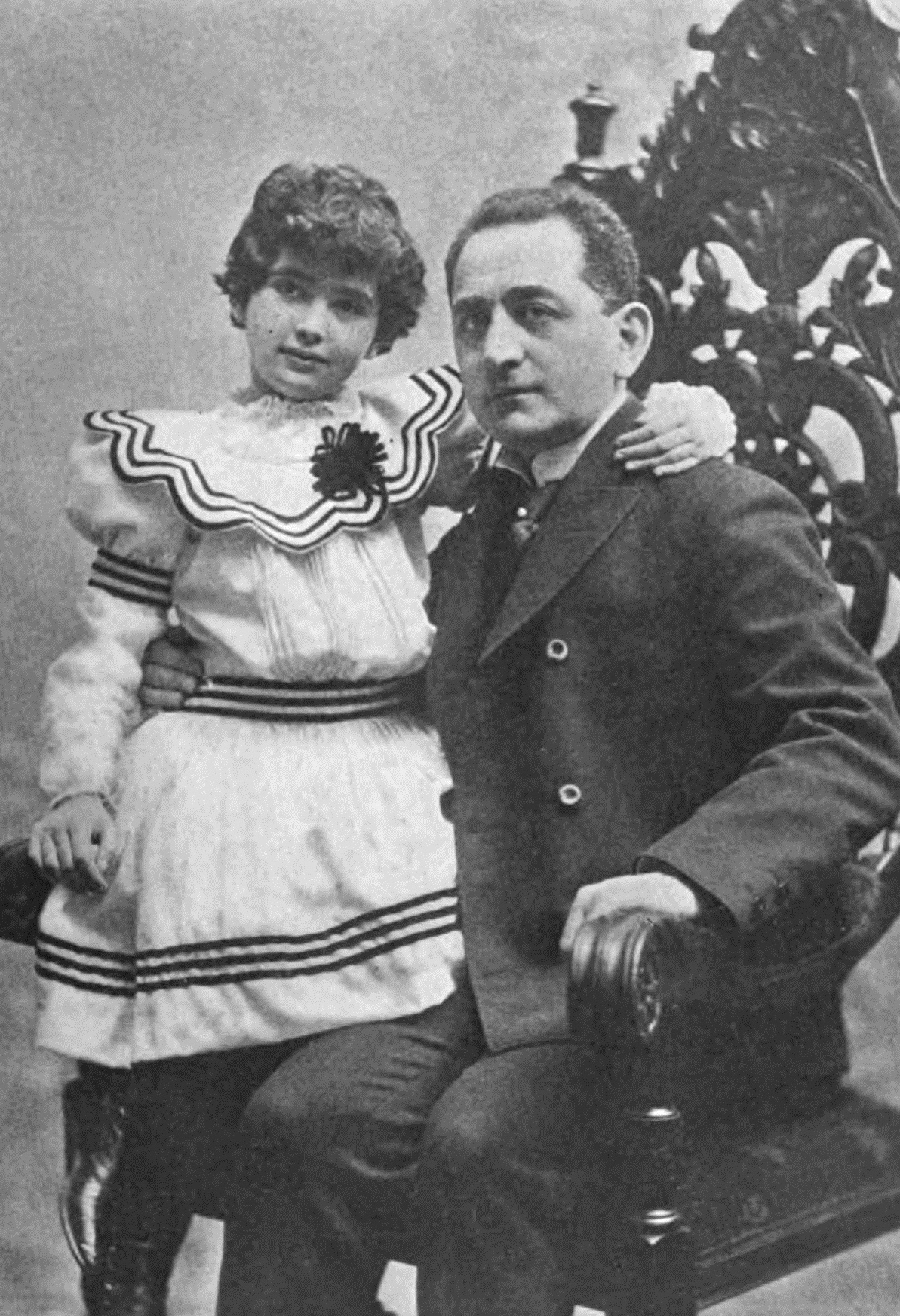
Adolph Ochs, publisher of The New York Times and his daughter, Iphigene

Iphigene Bertha Ochs was born on September 19, 1892, in Cincinnati, Ohio, the only child of Adolph Simon Ochs and Iphigenia "Effie" (Wise) Ochs. Her father was then the publisher of the Chattanooga Times, and her mother was a daughter of Rabbi Isaac Mayer Wise, founder of Reform Judaism. When Adolph purchased The New York Times in 1896, she moved with her parents to New York City. After being educated at private schools, including Sachs's School for Girls (that later became the Dwight School), she entered Barnard College in 1910 and graduated in 1914 with majors in economics and American and European history.

At Barnard, she met briefly with Arthur Hays Sulzberger, son of cotton merchant Cyrus Leopold Sulzberger. After college, she was reintroduced to him by her cousin, Julius Ochs Adler, who trained with Sulzberger in the military in Plattsburgh, New York. The two fell in love and were married on Nov. 17, 1917. Her husband joined The New York Times in 1918, while she spent the early years rearing her family. She gave birth to Marian Sulzberger Heiskell in 1918, Ruth Sulzberger Holmberg in 1921, Judith Sulzberger in 1923, and Arthur Ochs "Punch" Sulzberger in 1926.

== Career ==
Following her father's death in 1935, she became a trustee of The New York Times under his will, as well as one of the three trustees of his estate that had a controlling stake in it. However, she was deemed ineligible to inherit the newspaper because of her gender. Her husband was elected publisher the same year. As the publisher's wife, her role in the operations of the newspaper was described as one that often remained offstage but nonetheless vital, because as the family matriarch and the only offspring of Adolph Ochs, she exerted herself to maintain the familial unity necessary to jointly run a business and avoid feuds. Under her stewardship, the newspaper survived many challenges to the industry and remained one of the most prestigious and respected news organizations as well as a leading source of international news.

She played a role in helping her husband manage the newspaper after he was enfeebled by a stroke in his later years. Her son-in-law, Orvil Dryfoos, succeeded him from 1961 to 1963, until he died of heart failure at 50. He was succeeded by his brother-in-law and Sulzberger's only son Punch, who served as publisher from 1963 to 1992.

Sulzberger served as a director of The New York Times from 1917 to 1973, when she became director emeritus.

== Philanthropy ==
Sulzberger was known for her philanthropic activities. She was the president of the New York Park Association from 1928 to 1950. She was also a founding member of the Central Park Conservancy and helped to preserve and restore Central Park. She also became a benefactor to the Metropolitan Museum of Art, of which her son served as trustee since 1968, and chairman from 1987 to 1998. Sulzberger served on the board of trustees of Barnard College from 1937 to 1968 and helped with fundraising of the women's college. A dormitory building and a parlor in Barnard College are named in her honor. She was also a trustee of the Hebrew Union College-Jewish Institute of Religion and the University of Tennessee at Chattanooga.

== Family and personal life ==
Sulzberger died in her sleep at age ninety-seven on February 26, 1990. At the time of her death, she was survived by four children, 13 grandchildren, and 24 great-grandchildren. Her funeral at Congregation Emanu-El of New York was attended by well over a thousand people, including New York City mayor David Dinkins and former mayors Ed Koch and John Lindsay, U.S. senators Daniel Patrick Moynihan and Abraham Ribicoff, former United States Secretary of State Cyrus Vance, District Attorney Robert Morgenthau, Brown University president Vartan Gregorian, Washington Post publisher Katharine Graham, and President of the Museum of Modern Art William Luers.

Her first daughter, Marian, a director of the newspaper, married Andrew Heiskell, chairman of Time Inc., after her first husband Orvil Dryfoos died.

Her second daughter, Ruth, was a publisher of the Chattanooga Times (now the Chattanooga Times Free Press). She was married twice: to Ben Hale Golden and then to Albert W. Holmberg, Jr. Ruth's son, Arthur Golden, is a novelist who wrote the bestselling novel Memoirs of a Geisha. Her other son, Michael Golden, is currently vice chairman of The New York Times Company and former publisher of the International Herald Tribune. Ruth's son-in-law Edward Dolnick is a novelist as is her grandson, Ben Dolnick. Her other grandson, Sam Dolnick, is an assistant managing editor of The New York Times and was one of the candidates in 2018 to become the next publisher of the Times.

Her third daughter, Judith, became a physician. She married Matthew Rosenschein, Jr., then Richard N. Cohen, and finally Budd Levinson (twice).

Her only son, "Punch", served as publisher of The New York Times from 1963 to 1992. His son, Arthur Ochs "Pinch" Sulzberger Jr. succeeded him as publisher and became chairman of The New York Times Company in 1997. Arthur Jr.'s son A. G. Sulzberger became the publisher on January 1, 2018, and became chairman of The New York Times Company on December 31, 2020. Punch's other grandson, David Perpich, served as a senior vice president in the company and oversees its standalone products. He was another one of the candidates to be the next publisher of the Times after Pinch Sulzberger, along with A. G. Sulzberger and Sam Dolnick.
