= Sulzberger =

Sulzberger (German: habitational name for someone from a place called Sulzberg) is a surname. Notable people with the surname include:

- Arthur Hays Sulzberger (1891–1968), publisher of The New York Times from 1935 to 1961
- Arthur Ochs Sulzberger (1926–2012), publisher of The New York Times from 1963 to 1992
- Arthur Ochs Sulzberger Jr. (born 1951), publisher of The New York Times from 1992 to 2017
- Arthur Gregg Sulzberger (born 1980), publisher of The New York Times since 2018
- Mayer Sulzberger (1843–1923), American judge and Jewish communal leader
- Cyrus Leopold Sulzberger (1858–1932), American merchant and philanthropist
- Cyrus Leo Sulzberger II (1912–1993), American journalist, diarist, and non-fiction writer
- Marcel Sulzberger (1876–1941), Swiss composer, pianist and music author
- Myron Sulzberger (1878–1956), American lawyer, politician, and judge
