= Arthur Sulzberger =

Arthur Sulzberger may refer to:

- Arthur Hays Sulzberger (1891–1968), publisher of The New York Times from 1935 to 1961
- Arthur Ochs "Punch" Sulzberger Sr. (1926–2012), son of the above and publisher of The New York Times from 1963 to 1992
- Arthur Ochs Sulzberger Jr. (born 1951), son of the above and publisher of The New York Times from 1992 to 2017
- Arthur Gregg Sulzberger (born 1980), son of the above and publisher of The New York Times since 2018
