= Sam Dolnick =

American journalist, editor, and producer

- Education: Columbia University (BA)
- Occupation(s): Journalist, newspaper editor, television producer
- Employer: The New York Times
- Parents: Edward Dolnick; Lynn Iphigene Golden
- Relatives: Arthur Hays Sulzberger (great-grandfather); Iphigene Ochs Sulzberger (great-grandmother); Ruth Sulzberger Holmberg (grandmother); Arthur Golden (uncle); Michael Golden (uncle); Ben Dolnick (brother)
- Awards: George Polk Award (2013); Worth Bingham Prize (2012)

Sam Dolnick is an American journalist, film and television producer, and deputy managing editor for The New York Times. He helped launch The Daily podcast and the documentary series, The Weekly.

== Biography ==
Dolnick was born to novelist Edward Dolnick and Lynn Iphigene Golden, who met at Brandeis University as students. His mother is the daughter of Ruth Sulzberger Holmberg and a granddaughter of The New York Times publisher Arthur Hays Sulzberger and his wife, Iphigene Ochs Sulzberger. Through his mother, a director of The New York Times and the Smithsonian Zoo, he is a fifth-generation member of the Ochs-Sulzberger family that owns the newspaper. He has a brother, Ben Dolnick, who is a novelist. He is also the nephew of Arthur Golden, author of Memoirs of a Geisha, and Michael Golden, former publisher of the International Herald Tribune and vice chairman of The New York Times Company.

Dolnick graduated from Georgetown Day School, where he played basketball, and received his undergraduate degree from Columbia University. After graduating from Columbia, he interned for Wayne Barrett at The Village Voice in 2002 and worked night shifts at The Staten Island Advance from 2002 to 2004.

In 2004, Dolnick joined the Associated Press and moved to Delhi in 2007 as a foreign correspondent for AP. Dolnick joined The New York Times in 2009 as a metro reporter.

Dolnick was promoted to deputy sports editor in 2013. In addition to covering amateur cage-fighting, horse racing, and the Sochi Olympics, he also profiled the Sinaloa cartel's 90 year-old drug mule, Leo Sharp in 2014 for The New York Times Magazine. His story later became the inspiration for Clint Eastwood's 2018 film, The Mule. In 2014, he left the sports desk to become senior editor of the paper's mobile team.

In 2015, Dolnick was promoted to associate editor. As associate editor, he was responsible for launching numerous digital and mobile initiatives at the Times, including NYT Audio, NYT VR, The Daily podcast, The Daily 360, and the TV documentary series The Weekly, where he also serves as an executive producer. Dolnick was one of three cousins in the Ochs-Sulzberger family who had been candidates to become deputy publisher of the Times and successor to Arthur Sulzberger Jr. A.G. Sulzberger, the publisher's son, was named to the role in October 2016.

In 2017, Dolnick was elevated to masthead as an assistant editor. In that role, he oversees the Times' audiovisual work.

In 2018, he profiled a man named Erik Hagerman who, upon learning that Donald Trump has become president, decided to cut off from all news media and live in self-imposed isolation.

In 2019, Dolnick was elected a member of the Pulitzer Center board.

In 2022 he was promoted to deputy managing editor.

== Awards and nominations ==
Dolnick was the recipient the 2012 Worth Bingham Prize for investigative reporting into New Jersey's privatized halfway houses. He also won a George Polk Award in 2013 for the same work.
