= Dolnik =

Dolnik may refer to:

- Dolnik, Lower Silesian Voivodeship (south-west Poland)
- Dolnik, Greater Poland Voivodeship (west-central Poland)
- Dolnik, Silesian Voivodeship (south Poland)
- Dolnik, West Pomeranian Voivodeship (north-west Poland)

== People with the surname ==
This surname (spelling variants: Dolnik, Dolnick) is common among Slovaks and Jews.

=== Dolnik ===
- Viktor Dolnik (1938–2013), Russian ornithologist
- Vladimir Dolnik (born 1993), Slovak professional ice hockey player

=== Dolnick ===
- Ben Dolnick, writer
- Edward Dolnick, writer
- Sam Dolnick, journalist, editor of The New York Times
