= Ruth Sulzberger Holmberg =

American newspaper publisher and journalism manager (1921-2017)

- Born: Ruth Rachel Sulzberger; March 12, 1921; New York City
- Died: April 20, 2017 (age 96)
- Education: B.A. Smith College
- Occupation: Newspaper publisher
- Spouse(s): Ben Hale Golden (divorced); Albert William Holmberg Jr.
- Children: Stephen Golden; Michael Davis Golden; Lynn Golden Dolnick; Arthur Sulzberger Golden
- Parent(s): Iphigene Ochs Sulzberger; Arthur Hays Sulzberger
- Relatives: Arthur Ochs "Punch" Sulzberger (brother); Marian Sulzberger Heiskell (sister); Judith Sulzberger (sister); Edward Dolnick (son-in-law); Ben Dolnick (grandson); Sam Dolnick (grandson); Adolph S. Ochs (grandfather)

Ruth Sulzberger Holmberg (born Ruth Rachel Sulzberger; March 12, 1921 – April 20, 2017) was a newspaper publisher and member of the Ochs-Sulzberger family.

== Biography ==
Sulzberger was born to a Jewish family on March 12, 1921 in New York City, the second of four children of Iphigene Sulzberger (née Ochs) and Arthur Hays Sulzberger. Her father served as publisher of The New York Times from 1935 to 1961 and her maternal grandfather was Adolph S. Ochs, the owner of The Chattanooga Times and The New York Times. Her brother, Arthur Ochs "Punch" Sulzberger served as publisher of The New York Times and chairman and CEO of the Times Company; her sister Marian Sulzberger Heiskell (married to Andrew Heiskell) was a philanthropist; and her other sister, Judith P. Sulzberger was a doctor.

Sulzberger attended the Lincoln School and Brearley School; and then graduated from Smith College in 1943. She worked as a Red Cross volunteer during World War II in England and France assigned to the 394th Bombardment Group of the Ninth Air Force. In 1946, she moved to Chattanooga, Tennessee with her then husband, Ben Hale Golden, who was to train to become the eventual publisher of The Chattanooga Times.

Chattanooga, at the time, was not very welcoming to neither northern liberals nor Jews, even those who were married to Christians as she was. In 1957, her husband was named publisher, but resigned in 1964. The couple divorced in 1965, and Sulzberger succeeded her husband as publisher. While she was publisher, the Chattanooga Times took on an anti-establishment tone, supporting the: racial integration of schools, civil rights legislation, clean-air laws, anti-corruption initiatives, and an expanded role for blacks in local government. In the 1980s, she merged the newspaper's back office with arch-rival The News-Free Press although keeping news and editorials separate.

In 1984, she was elected president of the Southern Newspaper Publishers Association. In 1987, she was elected a director of The Associated Press, the second woman to do so after Katharine Graham. In 1997, Sulzberger and her siblings transferred ownership of The Chattanooga Times to their 13 children who sold it to Walter E. Hussman Jr. of the Wehco Media Company, who merged it with The News-Free Press to form the Chattanooga Times Free Press. Sulzberger served on the board of The New York Times from 1961 to 1998.

== Philanthropy ==
Sulzberger served as director of various organizations including the Smithsonian Institution, the Hunter Museum of American Art, the Chattanooga Symphony and Opera Association, the Chattanooga Community Foundation, the Tennessee Aquarium and the Chattanooga Area Beautification Committee. She also served as a trustee of the University of Tennessee at Chattanooga, was a founding member of the Tennessee Arts Commission, was a member of the Tennessee Higher Education Commission, served as chairwoman of the Public Education Foundation, and was the first female president of the Chattanooga Area Chamber of Commerce.

== Personal life ==
Sulzberger was married twice. Her first husband was Ben Hale Golden (died 1970), a Christian and Army Air Force officer whom she had met while she was in Europe during World War II. They had four children before divorcing in 1965: Stephen Golden; Michael Golden; Lynn Golden Dolnick (married to Edward Dolnick); and Arthur Sulzberger Golden. In 1972, she married Albert William Holmberg Jr. who was initially in charge of production, advertising and circulation at the paper; and was later named president. She had three stepchildren from the marriage: Jeanne Holmberg Johnson, Meg Holmberg Duckworth and Elin Holmberg-Rowland.
