= The New York Times International Edition =

English-language international newspaper

- The New York Times International Edition (8 August 2017)
- Type: Daily newspaper
- Format: Broadsheet
- Owner: The New York Times Company
- Publisher: A. G. Sulzberger
- Executive editor: Alison Smale
- Founded: 1943
- Political alignment: None
- Headquarters: London, England, UK; Several international offices
- Sister newspapers: The New York Times
- ISSN: 0294-8052
- OCLC number: 1156021026
- Website: www.nytimes.com/international/

Front page of the International New York Times of October 15, 2013, the first to be issued under this name before being integrated into The New York Times International Edition in October 2016

The New York Times International Edition is an English-language daily newspaper distributed internationally by the New York Times Company. It has been published in two separate periods, one from 1943 to 1967 and one from 2013 to the present.

== First incarnation ==
=== Overseas Weekly ===
The history of the international edition of the New York Times began in June 1943, following a visit by Times publisher Arthur Hays Sulzberger to Tehran, where he met with Brigadier General Donald H. Connolly of the Persian Gulf Service Command, who were in charge of moving Allied supplies to the Soviet Union via the Persian Corridor. Morale among the U.S. troops there was low, due to the difficult climate, unrewarding tasks, and isolation away from any of the combat fronts. Accordingly, Sulzberger decided to make an edition of the Times that could keep the troops informed and give them more awareness of how their efforts fit into the overall war effort. That product, the eight-page tabloid-sized Overseas Weekly edition, was a condensed version of the existing Sunday paper's News of the Week in Review section; it premiered in an edition dated August 22, 1943, but not available in Tehran until September 9.

The edition was popular and soon spread, and at its height during the war the Overseas Weekly was being printed in more than twenty locations around the globe. After the war, publication of the Overseas Weekly was limited to Frankfurt and Tokyo, where U.S. occupation forces were, with printing being done at the facilities of the Frankfurter Zeitung and the Asahi Shimbun respectively.

=== United Nations Edition and International Air Edition ===
During the third session of the United Nations General Assembly, which was held in Paris from September 21 to December 12, 1948, the Times created a United Nations Edition of the paper, which was flown to Paris each day.

This edition received a favorable reception, and beginning on December 11, 1948, the Times began its International Air Edition. Initially it consisted of 10–12 pages that were printed in whole in the United States and then flown to Europe, but in June 1949 the production process was changed so that only cardboard mats were flown over and the actual printing took place in Paris. The edition focused on U.S. national and international news and generally omitted New York area news and sports coverage.

As part of the June 1949 changes, the Overseas Weekly ended with a final issue on June 19, 1949, after which it was folded into the Sunday edition of the International Air Edition.

In 1952, production of the international edition was shifted from Paris to Amsterdam, as part of minimizing transportation costs.

=== International edition ===
In 1960, advances in teletypesetting allowed simultaneous printing of papers in New York and Europe; in conjunction with this, the international edition moved back to Paris. It was called the International Edition of The New York Times. The Times organization hoped to compete with the European edition of the New York Herald Tribune, which was also based in Paris and had a long, established history. Accordingly, the Times gave their publication a much larger budget for promotion than the Paris Herald Tribune had, and circulation improved somewhat.

Beginning in 1964, editorial control for the international edition shifted to Paris itself, and some independent reporting was being done out of that office. It was published on the Rue d'Aboukir in the 2nd arrondissement of Paris.

The New York Times had money-losing operations in maintaining both a Western U.S. edition and its International Edition. In January 1964, the paper announced that it was dropping its Western edition for financial reasons, but would keep on with the international one and move to a more streamlined production process for it. By then, the International Edition of The New York Times had a circulation of some 32,000, but attracted little advertising. As a commercial proposition it was inferior to the European edition of the New York Herald Tribune, which had a circulation of almost 50,000 and more advertising in it.

While the International Edition grew somewhat, it was still losing money and was not competitive with the European edition of the New York Herald Tribune, which was generally considered a stronger publication. Indeed, the international edition was losing $2 million a year, and had lost some $10 million since its creation under that title in 1949. The new Times publisher, Arthur Ochs Sulzberger, decided to give up on it, and instead join forces with the Washington Post for a continuation of the European edition of the Herald Tribune.

The final issue of the first incarnation of the New York Times international edition came out on May 20, 1967. The over 100 people working on it were laid off.

== International Herald Tribune ==
In 1967, The New York Times joined The Washington Post along with Whitney Communications to publish the International Herald Tribune in Paris.

In December 2002, The New York Times Company purchased the 50% stake owned by The Washington Post Company and the paper retained the name International Herald Tribune.

== Second incarnation ==
=== Change of name, closing of offices ===
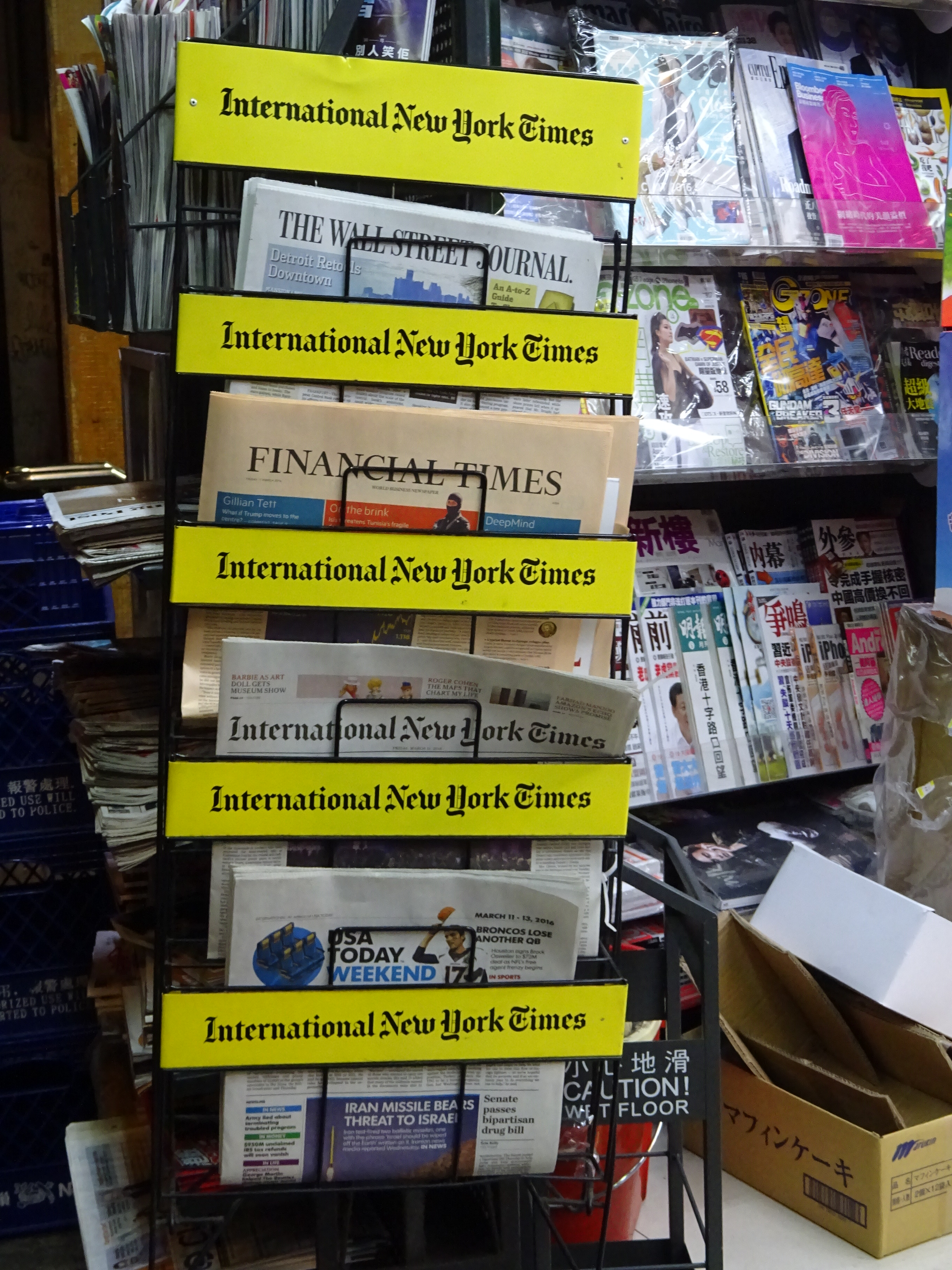
The International New York Times on a branded newsstand in Hong Kong, 11 March 2016

In 2013, the New York Times Company announced that the International Herald Tribune was being renamed The International New York Times.

On October 14, 2013, the International Herald Tribune appeared on newsstands for the last time and ceased publication.

In October 2016, the NYT's international edition was renamed The New York Times International Edition.

In Autumn 2016, the Paris newsroom, which had been the headquarters for editing and preproduction operations of the paper's international edition, was closed, although a news bureau and an advertising office remained.

=== The New York Times International Weekly ===
Besides the daily edition, a weekly 16-page edition is published as The New York Times International Weekly featuring the best of New York Times articles for a week. Designed to complement and extend local reporting, it offers readers globally resonant coverage of ideas and trends, business and politics, science and lifestyles and more. Host papers can monetize the NYT International Weekly through built-in advertising space, sponsorship and other opportunities to generate revenue.

== Defunct newspapers ==
=== The Paris Herald ===
The Paris Herald was founded on 4 October 1887 as the European edition of the New York Herald by the parent paper's owner, James Gordon Bennett, Jr.

=== Paris Herald Tribune ===
After the death of Bennett in 1918, Frank Munsey bought the New York Herald and the Paris Herald. Munsey sold the Herald newspapers in 1924 to Ogden Mills Reid of the New-York Tribune, thus creating the New York Herald Tribune, while the European edition became the Paris Herald Tribune.

In 1934, the Paris paper acquired its main competitor: the European Edition of the Chicago Tribune.

In 1959, John Hay Whitney, a businessman and United States Ambassador to the United Kingdom, bought the New York Herald Tribune and its European edition. In 1966, the New York Herald Tribune was merged into the short-lived New York World Journal Tribune and ceased publication, but the Whitney family kept the Paris paper going through partnerships. In December 1966 The Washington Post became a joint owner.

=== International Herald Tribune ===
The New York Times became a joint owner of the Paris Herald Tribune in May 1967, whereupon the newspaper became known as the International Herald Tribune (IHT).

In 1991, The Washington Post and The New York Times became sole and equal shareholders of the International Herald Tribune.

The Washington Post subsequently sold its stake in the International Herald Tribune.
