= Judith Sulzberger =

American pathologist

- Born: Judith Peixotto Sulzberger; December 27, 1923; New York City, New York, U.S.
- Died: February 21, 2011 (aged 87); New York City, New York, U.S.
- Education: Smith College; Columbia University College of Physicians and Surgeons
- Spouses: Matthew Rosenschein Jr. (m. 1946; div. 1956) 2 children, Richard N. Cohen (m. 1958; div. 1972), Budd Levinson (m. 1972; div. 1984), (before 2011)
- Children: Daniel H. Cohen (died 2016); James M. Cohen
- Parent(s): Arthur Hays Sulzberger; Iphigene Bertha Ochs
- Scientific career
- Fields: Medicine, pathology, public health, genome, autism spectrum disorders, malaria
- Workplaces: Columbia University College of Physicians and Surgeons; The New York Times; The East Hampton Star; Wildlife Conservation Society; Rainforest Alliance; Pasteur Foundation New York of Pasteur Institute; Grasslands Hospital; Weill Cornell Medical College; St. Luke's-Roosevelt Hospital Center

Judith Peixotto Sulzberger (December 27, 1923 – February 21, 2011) was an American physician and philanthropist. Her family has been associated with The New York Times since her grandfather Adolph Ochs purchased the paper in 1896.

== Early life and childhood ==
Sulzberger was one of four children of Iphigene Sulzberger (née Ochs) (1892–1990) and Arthur Hays Sulzberger (1891–1968), the publisher of The New York Times from 1935-61.

Her brother, Arthur Ochs "Punch" Sulzberger served as publisher of The New York Times and chairman and CEO of the Times Company; her sister Marian Sulzberger Heiskell was a philanthropist; and her other sister, Ruth Sulzberger Holmberg was a publisher.

== Education ==
She graduated from Smith College in 1946, and from the Columbia University College of Physicians and Surgeons in 1949. She spent two years interning in pathology at Grasslands Hospital of Valhalla, New York but never completed her residency.

== Career ==
She was a director of The New York Times from 1974 to 2000, and authored a book, Younger (2003).

In the early 1990s, she provided financing for what became the J.P. Sulzberger Genome Center at Columbia's College of Physicians and Surgeons, her alma mater.

== Personal life ==
She was married four times. She had two sons from her first marriage to Matthew Rosenschein Jr. : Daniel Hays Cohen (né Rosenschein) (1952-2016) and James Matthew "Jace" Cohen (né Rosenschein). Her sons were later adopted by her second husband Richard N. Cohen and they took his last name. Judith and her third husband Budd Levinson divorced in 1984, but later remarried.

== Death ==
She died at age 87 from pancreatic cancer in her native New York City. She was survived by, among others, her third husband, Budd Levinson, and her two sons, Daniel Hays Cohen (died 2016) and James Matthew Cohen (from her first marriage), as well as a stepdaughter, two stepsons, four grandchildren, and several step-grandchildren.
