= Ghost note (disambiguation) =

A ghost note is a musical note with a rhythmic value, but no discernible pitch when played.

Ghost note may also refer to:

- Ghost-Note (band), a funk, hip-hop, and jazz band
- Ghost Notes, an album by Veruca Salt
- Ghost Notes (Vardøger album)
- Ghost Notes, an upcoming heavy metal music EP by Nikki Stringfield and Patrick Kennison

== See also ==
- The Ghost Note Symphonies, Vol. 1
- The Ghost Notebooks
