= Marian Sulzberger Heiskell =

American newspaper executive and philanthropist (1918–2019)

- Born: Marian Effie Sulzberger; December 31, 1918; Manhattan, New York City, New York, U.S.
- Died: March 14, 2019 (aged 100)
- Occupations: Newspaper executive, philanthropist
- Years active: 1963–1997
- Employer: The New York Times
- Spouse(s): Orvil E. Dryfoos (m. 1941; died 1963); Andrew Heiskell (m. 1965; died 2003)
- Children: 3
- Parent(s): Arthur Hays Sulzberger; Iphigene Ochs Sulzberger
- Relatives: Ruth Sulzberger Holmberg (sister); Judith Sulzberger (sister); Arthur Ochs Sulzberger (brother)

Marian Sulzberger Heiskell (born Marian Effie Sulzberger; December 31, 1918 – March 14, 2019) was an American newspaper executive and philanthropist, and a member of the family that owns The New York Times.

== Early life ==
She was born Marian Effie Sulzberger on December 31, 1918 in Manhattan, New York to parents Arthur Hays Sulzberger and Iphigene Sulzberger (née Ochs). She was the sister of Ruth Sulzberger Holmberg, Judith Sulzberger and Arthur Ochs "Punch" Sulzberger.

Her first marriage was to Orvil E. Dryfoos in 1941. They had three children. She later married Andrew Heiskell, who was at the time the chairman of Time Inc., in 1965.

== Career ==
Heiskell was known for her work in publishing, conservation and philanthropy. As a member of the Sulzberger family that controls The New York Times, she became a director of the Times in 1963, holding the position for 34 years. Outside of the Times, she was also credited for having originated the concept for People Magazine.

In the area of conservation, she founded the Council on the Environment of New York City, now known as Grow NYC, in 1970. Heiskell was a chairwoman of the National Parks of New York Harbor Conservancy.

From 1990 to 2012, she was the chairwoman of New 42nd Street, a non-profit organization dedicated to revitalizing New York's 42nd Street Theater District.

She was a board member of The New York Botanical Garden, New Yorkers for Parks, Audubon New York, and the Community Service Society of New York.

== Awards ==
In 2004, Heiskell received the Thomas W. Keesee, Jr. Conservation Award, followed by the Rachel Carson Award in 2013, both given by the Audubon Society. In 2005 she received the Land Conservation award from the Open Space Institute. In 2018 she received the Federal Hall Medal for Leadership from the New York Harbor Parks Conservancy, an organization she had played a role in founding.
