= Orvil Dryfoos =

American newspaper publisher

- Born: Orvil Eugene Dryfoos; November 8, 1912
- Died: May 25, 1963 (aged 50)
- Education: Dartmouth College (BA)
- Known for: Publisher of The New York Times
- Spouse: Marian Sulzberger
- Children: 3
- Family: Arthur Hays Sulzberger (father-in-law); Iphigene Ochs Sulzberger (mother-in-law)

Orvil Eugene Dryfoos (November 8, 1912 – May 25, 1963) was the publisher of The New York Times from 1961 to his death. He entered the Times family via his marriage to Marian Sulzberger, daughter of then-publisher Arthur Hays Sulzberger.

== Early life ==
Dryfoos was born to Jack A. Dryfoos and the former Florence Levi. The elder Dryfoos was a wealthy hosiery manufacturer who was also the treasurer of a paper novelty manufacturing company. Orvil Dryfoos attended the Horace Mann School in New York City and Dartmouth College. He majored in sociology and graduated with a bachelor's degree in 1934.

Upon graduation he began work as a runner on Wall Street at the firm Asiel & Co. In 1937 he moved to the firm Sydney Lewinson & Co. as a partner and purchased a seat on the New York Stock Exchange. Dryfoos belonged to Congregation Emanu-El of New York. Dryfoos was prevented from serving in World War II due to a diagnosis of rheumatic heart disease. He worked instead for the New York Red Cross Chapter's blood donor committee through the war.

== The New York Times ==
On July 8, 1941, he married Marian Sulzberger, daughter of New York Times publisher Arthur Hays Sulzberger. His father-in-law had also married into the Ochs family who owned the paper. He was the husband of Adolph Ochs's only child, Iphigene Ochs. "I was sensible enough to marry the boss's daughter," Sulzberger told Dryfoos, "and you were too."

In 1942, Dryfoos left Wall Street to be groomed to lead The New York Times and he became a reporter on the local staff. Though he worked numerous assignments, he never earned a byline during his year on the writing staff. The next year he became assistant to the publisher. He had three children: Jacqueline Hays, (born May 8, 1943), Robert Ochs (November 4, 1944) and Susan Warms (November 5, 1946).

Dryfoos became a trustee of his alma mater Dartmouth, a lay trustee of Fordham University, and trustee and executive committee member of the Rockefeller Foundation, a director of the New York Convention and Visitors Bureau, a director of the Fifth Avenue Association, a director of the 1964 New York World's Fair, and president of the company charity, The New York Times Foundation. He was awarded an honorary Master of Arts in 1957 from Dartmouth and an honorary Doctor of Laws in 1962 from Oberlin College.

In 1954 Dryfoos became a vice-president and director of the company. In 1957 he became Times president and after Sulzberger suffered a stroke in 1958, Dryfoos became responsible for most of the paper's day-to-day operations. He officially became publisher on April 25, 1961, when Sulzberger stepped down.

Dryfoos immediately appointed veteran editorial board member, writer, and iconoclast John Bertram Oakes editorial page editor. Another of Dryfoos's first orders of business was launching the Western Edition of The New York Times, which was announced on October 31, 1961.

=== Newspaper strike ===
The defining struggle of Dryfoos' tenure at The Times was a lengthy newspaper strike, which began in late 1962 and brought the publishing industry of New York to its knees. The staff of The Times dropped from 5,000 working personnel to only 900.

The stress of negotiations and continuing to produce as much of a paper as possible adversely affected Dryfoos's health, as he worked to resolve the strike.

The strike lasted for 114 days and at the time was identified as the costliest in Times history. On March 31, 1963, the strikers returned to work. Dryfoos maintained cordial relations with strikers throughout the stoppage and greeted the staff with a letter stating, "It's good to see you back at work!"

== Personal life ==
Dryfoos and his wife, the former Marian Sulzberger, had three children: Jacqueline Hays Dryfoos (born 1943), a psychotherapist divorced from Stuart Greenspon; Robert Ochs Dryfoos (born 1944), divorced from Katie Thomas; and Susan Warms Dryfoos (born 1946), married first to Douglas Howcroft Mazonowicz and second to Daniel Selznick, son of film producer David O. Selznick and Irene Mayer Selznick.

== Death ==
Following the protracted, and draining, 112-day newspaper strike of 1962-63, Dryfoos went to Puerto Rico to recover, but while there he checked into a hospital. He returned to New York and immediately went to Columbia Presbyterian Medical Center. He died there on May 25, 1963, from heart failure at the age of 50.

Dryfoos's funeral at Congregation Emanu-El of New York was attended by many notable residents of New York City, including New York City mayor Robert F. Wagner, Jr., Columbia University president Grayson L. Kirk and later long-time New York District Attorney Robert M. Morgenthau. Many members of the Rockefeller family were there, including New York Governor Nelson Rockefeller, Lincoln Center chairman John D. Rockefeller III, and Chase Manhattan Bank president David Rockefeller. Many of his rival publishers attended: Hearst Newspapers editor in chief William Randolph Hearst, Jr., Newhouse publisher Samuel Irving Newhouse, Sr., New York Post publisher Dorothy Schiff, CBS president Frank Stanton, and Time Inc. chairman Andrew Heiskell (in 1965, Heiskell married Dryfoos's widow, Marian). James Reston, the Washington correspondent and future executive editor of The New York Times who was also a close friend of Dryfoos, gave the eulogy. Reston said that Dryfoos "wore his life away" during the strike and "when the strike was over he finally slipped away to the hospital and never came back."

He was succeeded as publisher by Arthur Ochs "Punch" Sulzberger, the son of Arthur Hays Sulzberger, and younger brother of Marian Sulzberger Dryfoos.

Business positions
Preceded by Arthur Hays Sulzberger	The New York Times Company Publisher; 1961–1963	Succeeded by Arthur Ochs Sulzberger
