= Henry Alloway =

Henry Alloway (1856-1939) was an American journalist, publisher, and the financial editor of The New York Times from 1896 to 1906. He also owned several New York and New England newspapers, including The New Haven Palladium, The New Haven Union, The Hartford Evening Post, and The Wall Street Daily News.

Alloway was born into a Quaker family near Dover, Delaware, and began his career with the Exeter News-Letter. In 1878, he became editor of The Daily Freeman in Kingston, New York, and left the following year to join The New York Times as a financial writer.

Alloway initiated the NYT takeover in 1896 by Adolph S. Ochs and helped the Chattanooga journalist negotiate the buyout. After leaving the NYT to run his own newspapers, Alloway maintained a regular column in the Wall Street Journal, “By-the-Bye,” which appeared regularly for fourteen years.
