= Buried by the Times =

Book by Laurel Leff

Buried by the Times: The Holocaust and America's Most Important Newspaper
- Author: Laurel Leff
- Subject: Journalism, The Holocaust
- Genre: nonfiction
- Publisher: Cambridge University Press
- Publication date: 21 March 2005
- ISBN: 0521812879

Buried by the Times is a 2005 book by Laurel Leff.

The book is a critical account of The New York Times's coverage of Nazi atrocities against Jews that culminated in the Holocaust. It argues that the news was often buried in the back pages in part due to the view about Judaism of the paper's Jewish publisher, Arthur Hays Sulzberger. It also gives a critical look at the work of Times correspondents in Europe.

The book received critical acclaim and was the recipient of the best media history book from the American Journalism Historians Association.

== Argument ==
=== Placement of news articles ===
The placement of news articles in a newspaper is a good indication of the importance given by the newspaper to a story. The Times consistently placed major stories about the Nazi treatment of European Jews on back pages "by the soap and shoe polish ads". Leff found that during the period September 1939 to May 1945 very few stories about Jewish victims made the Times front page. "The story of the Holocaust—meaning articles that focused on the discrimination, deportation, and destruction of the Jews—made the Times front page just 26 times, and only in six of those stories were Jews identified on the front as the primary victims."

=== Terminology ===
Leff points out that the Times often used a more generic term such as refugee or nationality to refer to Nazi victims who were Jewish. In his review, Gal Beckerman writes, "More shocking even than the chronic burying of articles with the word 'Jew' in them is how often that word was rubbed out of articles that specifically dealt with the Jewish condition. It's almost surreal at times. How could you possibly tell the story of the Warsaw Ghetto Uprising without mentioning Jews? But The Times did, describing how '500,000 persons ... were herded into less than 7 percent of Warsaw's buildings,' and how '400,000 persons were deported' to their deaths at Treblinka. As Leff put it, The Times, 'when it ran front-page stories, described refugees seeking shelter, Frenchmen facing confiscation, or civilians dying in German camps, without making clear the refugees, Frenchmen, and civilians were mostly Jews.'"

=== Role of religion ===
Sulzberger was a convinced Reform Jew which was the basis of his assimilationist approach: Judaism for him was only a religion and that Jews were neither a race nor a people any more than Presbyterians or Methodists were a race. In December 1942 in a memo to New York Times staff he wrote "I have been trying to instruct the people around here on the subject of the word 'Jews', i.e., that they are neither a race nor a people, etc.," Former New York Times journalist Ari Goldman, in his review of the book, writes: "There can be little doubt that Sulzberger's views about Judaism trickled down to the editors making the decisions about what to put in the newspaper every day."

=== Staff biases ===
Leff examines the stances and performances of the Times's reporting and editorial staff. In the field, "She exposes the disturbing Nazi and Vichy attachments of a few European correspondents." While back in New York, Sulzberger's bias was shared by other Jewish staffers: "Between them and influential Catholics among the crucial night editors, who decided where to place news items, the imperiled Jews of Europe had no advocate in the newsroom."

== Conclusion ==
Blame for the lack of coverage: Beside the biases and lack of competence of the European correspondents, Leff "points out the problems with journalistic convention of the time, which preferred reprinting government pronouncements to digging for unknown stories. There was also, of course, a disorganized Jewish community and a Roosevelt administration too preoccupied with the war, both not pushing hard enough for front-page coverage. But the bulk of the blame, in Leff's telling, falls squarely at the feet of The Times's publisher, Sulzberger."

A number of observers have observed how badly informed the American public was about the Nazis' systematic murder of European Jews. Leff points out that the way The Times covered the Holocaust "contributed to the public's ignorance." But in addition to poorly informing the public, "The Times' coverage mattered so much," she writes, "because other bystanders, particularly the American government, American Jewish groups, and the rest of the American press, took cues from the paper. Among major American newspapers, it was unique in the information it received, how it disseminated the news, and to whom."

== Reception ==
The book received critical acclaim.

English historian David Cesarani, reviewing the book in the Jewish Chronicle, wrote: "The light which Laurel Leff sheds on US government policy adds to the value of her densely documented and judiciously written study. It is a model of research with serious implications for how the press covers atrocity and genocide in our own times."

Another Holocaust historian, Tim Cole, writing in the Journal of Jewish Studies points out a wider benefit from the study: "her book stands as a model for future studies in this sub-field of Holocaust Studies '"

Journalist and Stanford professor Susan Tifft wrote: "The devil is the details in Laurel Leff's prodigiously researched examination of how the New York Times, through story placement and editorial judgment, consciously downplayed news about the fate of European Jews from 1939 to 1945 ... What distinguishes her effort from [David S. Wyman and Deborah E. Lipstadt] is a tight focus on a single newspaper and its publisher, Arthur Hays Sulzberger, and the prosecutorial zeal with which she goes about building her case that the Times, in journalistic parlance, 'missed the story', big time."

Legal academic Lawrence Douglas stated that Leff had "written a highly readable and scrupulously researched book about an important journalistic failure ... Leff's conclusion—that the Times helped to 'drown out the last cry from the abyss'—rings both melodramatic and true."

Daniel Johnson, writing in Commentary, wrote: "Leff's Excellent book is more than an indictment of the Times's willful myopia; it also investigates how and why it came about ... The facts set out by Leff are indisputable; the question of motive is more complex and speculative "

According to Beckerman, "Beneath every word of Laurel Leff's extraordinary and thorough new study of The New York Times's coverage of what we now call the Holocaust is this same desire—for the paper to be shocked and outraged beyond its very black-and-white bounds."

A review in Shofar described the book as "an engrossing and well documented history which reminds us, once again, of what occurs when evil is left unchecked by those with the power to intervene ... [the book] not only provides an important and little known piece of an historical puzzle, it also compels us to rethink questions of agency, responsibility, and the problematic—and often powerful—role of the media."

Historian Severin Hochberg of the United States Holocaust Memorial Museum commented that Leff does "an especially good job of demonstrating how much credible information was in fact available to the far-flung corps of New York Times European correspondents ... It is meticulously researched, and adds greater depth to our knowledge of a subject originally addressed in Deborah Lipstadt's Beyond Belief: The American Press and the Coming of the Holocaust."

A review in The Atlanta Journal-Constitution wrote: "s a veteran of newsrooms, she brings to her analysis something many media scholars lack—a common-sense understanding of how news gets produced and published. This book, her first, can wear you down with its prosecutorial weight. But its point is too important to be buried by these times, when genocide and confused war aims vie with celebrity trials and pseudo-news."

A review in Choice rated the book "Highly Recommended" and stated that: "Leff's excellent book surely deserves a central place in any future scholarly assessment of journalism's role in reporting the Holocaust and in influencing public opinion by properly and persuasively interpreting its reports."

Mark Feldstein of George Washington University wrote of the book: "This book is a searing indictment, but it is buttressed by meticulous and broad research drawing on an impressive array of primary source materials, including numerous archives and interviews...It is passionately written yet nuanced and complex-careful not to overstate evidence, to disclose gaps in the historical record, and to offer measured and qualified conjectures when necessary to explain events.This account exemplifies the best of journalism history by tackling a subject of true significance with a range that reaches beyond the discipline. It will deservedly endure as the definitive work about this neglected but vital subject."

A review in Journalism referred to the book as an "extensively researched historical study ... The book can be read beyond its historical value, too. Concepts from the sociology of news literature – although not used directly – stand out nonetheless ... In all, though, this book will appeal to a range of readers, from historians to critics of the news media to students of the sociological and cultural understandings for why news turns out as it does."

A reviewer in History: The Journal of the Historical Association wrote: "Importantly Leff anchors her analysis in a detailed investigation of how the paper worked – from the political sympathies of its correspondents in the field to the editorial policies of those who decided what prominence to give individual stories."

Newspaper editor Seth Lipsky wrote: "The importance of Leff's book is in helping us to understand what happened so that we can be faster on our feet and avoid the same mistakes now that a new war against the Jews is under way and a new generation of newspaper men and women are on the story."

Journalism professor Ron Hollander wrote that: "While Leff undeniably proves that the Times's general failure to put the Holocaust on page one resulted from a timid self-consciousness over Jewish self-identity, her emphasis on front-page coverage as the only coverage that counts seems too narrow ... But despite such problems, Buried by the Times is admirably relentless in showing that ... the Times failed miserably in reporting the enormity of the Holocaust. More damning still, that failure seems intentional."

However, American historian Peter Novick, writing in The Washington Post, criticized her approach. "The tone of Leff's account is one of unremitting outrage. When The Times fails to report any Holocaust-related event, she is outraged. If the paper reports on it, she's outraged that the report isn't on the front page..She is regularly outraged when either reportage or commentary, wherever placed, mentions not Jews alone but other victims as well. When one item made clear that a majority of those killed at a certain locale were Jews, she complains that this was noted 'only once' in the story. All of this is so over-the-top as to verge on self-parody."

=== Honors and awards ===
- Best media history book, American Journalism Historians Association
- Best history book, Foreword Magazine

== Related work ==
Leff's ongoing work on American responses to the Holocaust continues to draw commentary. Her research paper "Rebuffing Refugee Journalists: The Profession's Failure to Help Jews Persecuted by Nazi Germany" asserting that journalists, unlike physicians and attorneys, failed to establish committees to help Jewish refugees secure positions that would have made them exempt from immigration limits and allowed them to come to the United States, inspired a campaign to get the Newspaper Association of America to acknowledge its predecessor organization in the 1930s "was wrong to turn its back on Jewish refugee journalists fleeing Hitler". The Newspaper Association of America responded by issuing a statement regretting that its predecessor organization did not give a full public airing to the issue at the time and by holding a special session on the topic at its annual meeting.

== See also ==
- IBM and the Holocaust
