= Ben Dolnick =

American novelist

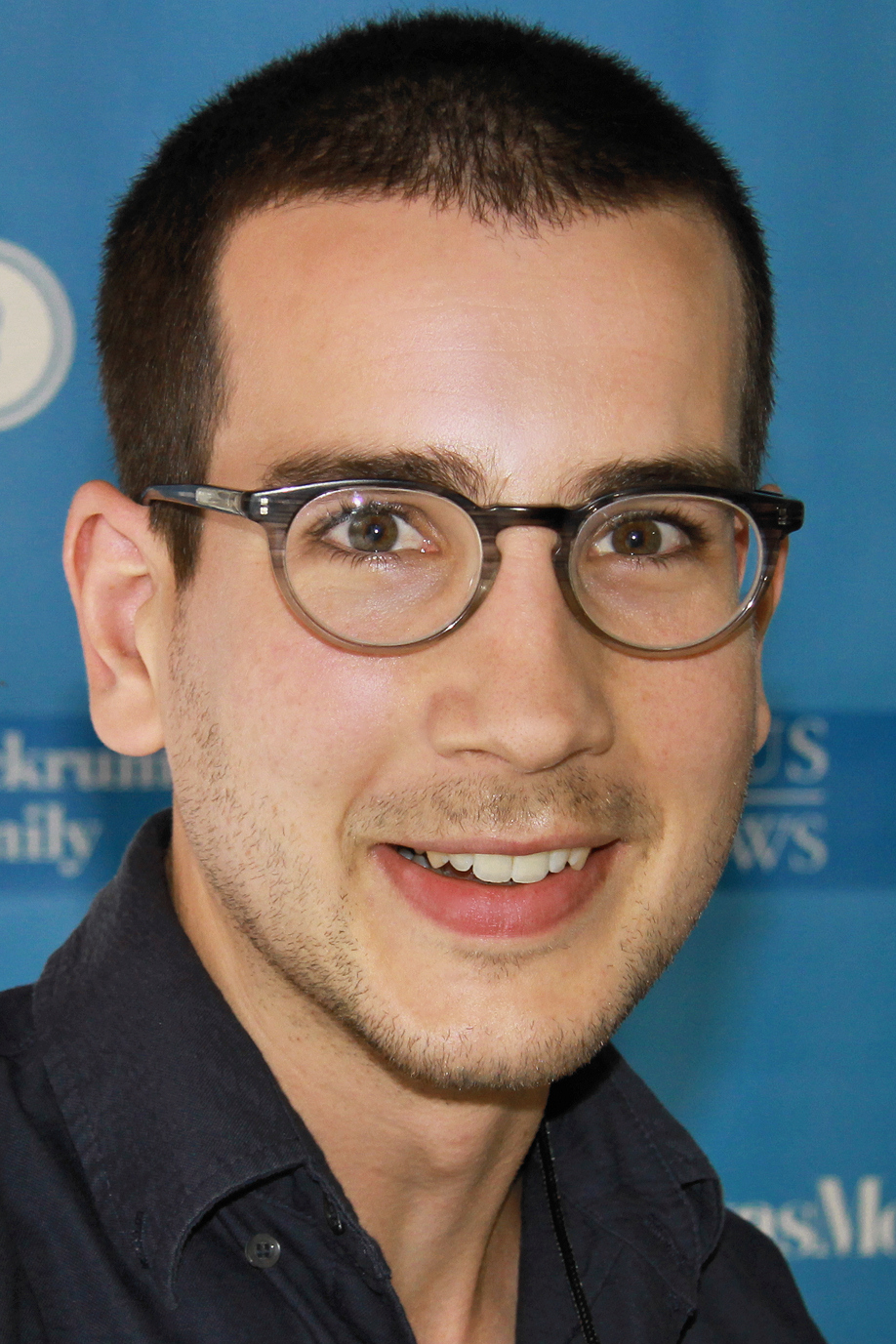
- Dolnick at the 2013 Texas Book Festival
- Born: 1982 (age 43–44); Chevy Chase, Maryland, U.S.
- Education: Columbia University
- Parent(s): Edward Dolnick (father); Lynn Golden Dolnick (mother)
- Relatives: Arthur Hays Sulzberger (great-grandfather); Iphigene Ochs Sulzberger (great-grandmother); Ruth Sulzberger Holmberg (grandmother); Arthur Golden (uncle); Sam Dolnick (brother); Dave Golden (cousin)
- Writing career
- Genre: Novels

Ben Dolnick (born 1982) is an American fiction writer and author of the novels Zoology (2007), You Know Who You Are (2011), and At the Bottom of Everything: A Novel (2013).

== Life ==
Ben Dolnick was born and raised in Chevy Chase, Maryland. Through his mother's side he is a member of the Ochs-Sulzberger family, publishers of The New York Times. He attended Georgetown Day School and went on to receive his undergraduate degree from Columbia University, and has worked as a "zookeeper" at the Central Park Zoo. He currently lives in Brooklyn, New York.

== Works ==
- Zoology. Knopf Doubleday Publishing Group. 2007. ISBN 978-0-307-38654-0.
- You Know Who You Are. Knopf Doubleday Publishing Group. 2011. ISBN 978-0-307-74200-1.
- At the Bottom of Everything: A Novel. Knopf Doubleday Publishing Group. 2013. ISBN 978-0-307-90799-8.
- The Ghost Notebooks, 2018
