= C. L. Sulzberger =

American journalist, diarist and non-fiction writer

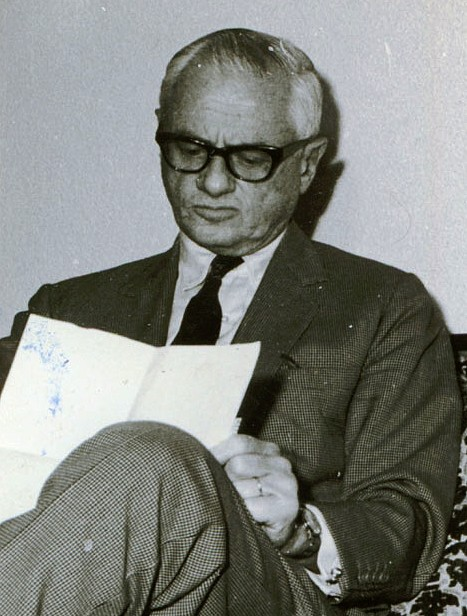
- Sulzberger in 1968
- Born: Cyrus Leo Sulzberger II; October 27, 1912; New York City, U.S.
- Died: September 20, 1993 (aged 80); Paris, France
- Education: Harvard University
- Occupation: Journalist
- Spouse: Marina Tatiana Ladas
- Children: 2
- Family: Cyrus Leopold Sulzberger (grandfather); Arthur Hays Sulzberger (uncle); Adrian Michael Berry (son-in-law)

Cyrus Leo Sulzberger II (October 27, 1912 – September 20, 1993) was an American journalist, diarist, and non-fiction writer. He was a member of the family that owned The New York Times and he was that newspaper's lead foreign correspondent during the 1940s and 1950s.

== Biography ==
Sulzberger was born in New York City on October 27, 1912 to Leopold Sulzberger (1885–1926) and Beatrice A Josephi (1890-?). He was the grandson of Cyrus Leopold Sulzberger and the nephew of Arthur Hays Sulzberger, who was publisher of The New York Times from 1935 to 1961. He graduated magna cum laude from Harvard University in 1934. Cy, as he was commonly called, joined the family paper in 1939 and was soon covering stories overseas as Europe edged toward World War II. Among the reporters who worked for him during the war were Drew Middleton and James Reston. He served as a foreign affairs correspondent for 40 years and wrote two dozen books in his lifetime. His skill as a raconteur was legendary as were his friendships with high and mighty or just plain interesting people. Because of the circles he traveled in, he sometimes carried messages from one foreign leader to another; for U.S. President John F. Kennedy he conveyed a note to Soviet premier Nikita Khrushchev in 1961. Of all the leaders he befriended, it is said that he was closest to President Charles de Gaulle of France.

In a 1977 article for Rolling Stone, journalist Carl Bernstein claimed that Sulzberger, among a list of columnists and commentators, had Central Intelligence Agency relationships "far beyond those normally maintained between reporters and their sources." He cited CIA files referring to Sulzberger as a "known asset". Bernstein quoted unnamed CIA officials as saying Sulzberger at one time published a briefing paper the CIA provided him almost verbatim under his byline. Sulzberger called the allegation "a lot of baloney", and insisted that while the agency might have considered him an "asset" in giving them information about his travels to (fictitious nations) "Slobovia" or "Ruritania", he never took formal assignments from the agency nor would "get caught near the spook business." The Times also denied that Sulzberger had ever been a paid CIA agent.

Sulzberger received a Pulitzer Prize Special Citation in 1951 for his exclusive interview with imprisoned Archbishop of Zagreb Aloysius Stepinac.

== Personal life ==
In 1942 Sulzberger married Marina Tatiana Ladas, a Greek who was often his travel companion and ensured that they had an active and elegant social life in Paris. She died in 1976 and he died at their Paris home on September 20, 1993. They had two children: David Alexis Sulzberger and Marina Beatrice Sulzberger. In 1967, Marina Beatrice Sulzberger married Adrian Michael Berry, who later became 4th Viscount Camrose, thereby linking two newspaper dynasties. The Camrose family had once owned The Daily Telegraph and retained an interest in that paper until it was taken over by Conrad Black in 1986.

== Selected books ==
- Sit Down with John L. Lewis (New York: Random House, 1938) — about CIO founder John L. Lewis
- The American Heritage Picture History of World War II (New York: American Heritage, 1966), by Sulzberger with the editors of American Heritage
- A Long Row of Candles: Memoirs and Diaries, 1934-1954 (New York: Macmillan, 1969)
- The Tooth Merchant: A Novel (New York: Quadrangle, 1973) — a novel in which Sulzberger himself appears briefly as a journalist
- An Age of Mediocrity: Memoirs and Diaries, 1963-1972 (New York: Macmillan, 1973)
- Go Gentle Into the Night (Englewood Cliffs, N.J.: Prentice-Hall, Inc., 1976) – Sulzberger's anthology of prayers
- The Fall of Eagles (New York: Crown Publishers, 1977)
