= Michael Golden (businessman) =

American publisher and businessman

- Born: Michael Davis Golden
- Education: Lehigh University (BA, M.Ed); University of Missouri (MA); Emory University (MBA)
- Occupation: Newspaper executive
- Known for: Vice Chairman of the New York Times Company
- Spouse: Anne Goodrich Barnes
- Parent(s): Ruth Sulzberger Golden; Ben Hale Golden

Michael Davis Golden is an American businessman, currently serving as vice chairman of the New York Times Company.

== Early life and education ==
Golden was born in Chattanooga, Tennessee, the son of Ruth Sulzberger Holmberg and Ben Hale Golden. His mother was Jewish and his father an Anglo. His mother was a daughter of long-time Times publisher Arthur Hays Sulzberger and granddaughter of Times owner and publisher Adolph Ochs.

Golden is a double graduate of Lehigh University in Bethlehem, Pennsylvania, where he earned his bachelor's degree in 1971 and master's in education in 1974. Golden earned his master's degree in journalism from University of Missouri in 1977. He went on to receive an MBA from Emory University in 1984.

== Career ==
From 1976 to 1983, Golden worked for eight years in a series of editorial and management posts at The Chattanooga Times in Tennessee.

In 1984, Golden joined the New York Times Company and served as production manager of Family Circle magazine.

From 1986 to 1988, Golden served as senior vice president of The Retail Magazine Marketing Company, which was the company's magazine distributor.

From 1988 to 1990, Golden served as general manager of Child magazine, and from 1990 to 1991, he served as publisher of McCall's magazine.

From 1991 to 1994, Golden served as executive vice president and general manager of the Women's Publishing Division. In 1994, The New York Times Company sold their Women's Publishing Division.

From 1994 to 1996, Golden was executive vice president and publisher at Tennis magazine.

From 1996 to 1997, Golden served as vice president for operations development. In 1997, Golden was elected to the board of directors of The New York Times Company, and named vice chairman in October of that year.

In November 2003, Golden was named publisher of the International Herald Tribune. From 1967, the International New York Times was published as the International Herald Tribune and was renamed on October 15, 2013.

== Personal life ==
In 1971, he married Anne Goodrich Barnes.
