= John Bertram Oakes =

American journalist

- Born: April 23, 1913; Elkins Park, Pennsylvania
- Died: April 5, 2001 (aged 87); Manhattan, New York
- Education: Princeton University; The Queen's College, Oxford
- Occupation: Journalist
- Relatives: Adolph Ochs (uncle)

John Bertram Oakes (April 23, 1913 – April 5, 2001) was an iconoclastic and influential U.S. journalist known for his early commitment to the environment, civil rights, and opposition to the Vietnam War.

== Background ==
John Bertram Oakes was born on April 23, 1913, in Elkins Park, Pennsylvania, the second son of George Washington Ochs Oakes and Bertie Gans. He is regarded as the creator of the modern op-ed page and was editor of the New York Times editorial page from 1961 to 1976. His uncle was New York Times publisher Adolph Ochs. Oakes attended the Collegiate School and later Princeton University (A.B., 1934), where he was valedictorian of his class and graduated magna cum laude. He then became a Rhodes Scholar at Queens College, Oxford.

== Career ==
On his return to the United States in 1936, he joined the Trenton Times as a reporter. A supporter of Franklin D. Roosevelt's New Deal, he moved to Washington in 1937, where he became a political reporter for The Washington Post. In Washington, he covered the U.S. Congress, the Dies Un-American Activities Committee and F.D.R.'s 1940 campaign.

When the United States joined World War II in 1941, Oakes entered the Army as a private in the infantry. His training at Camp Ritchie and connection to the Ritchie Boys allowed him to be recruited into the O.S.S. (the Office of Strategic Services), and as a result he served two years in Europe, capturing and "turning" enemy agents still in communication with the Nazis. In recognition of his service there he received the Bronze Star, the Croix de Guerre, the Medaille de Reconnaissance and the Order of the British Empire. He ended the war with the rank of lieutenant colonel.

=== New York Times ===
Immediately after his discharge in 1946, he joined the "family paper" as editor of the Sunday New York Times "Review of the Week." Three years later, he became a member of the editorial board. While an editorial page writer, in 1951 he convinced the paper's editors to let him write a monthly column on the then relatively neglected subject of the environment - the first such column at a major national newspaper. He also wrote for other areas of the paper, such as the book review and the Sunday magazine. His memorable profile of Joseph McCarthy ("This Is the Real, the Lasting Damage," March 7, 1954) became the basis of an Eleanor Roosevelt newspaper column and was subsequently widely reprinted.

His career on the editorial board, first as a writer (1949–1961) and then as editorial page editor (1961–1976) spanned the Truman, Eisenhower, Kennedy, Johnson, Nixon and Ford administrations. As editorial page editor, he appointed the first woman in fifty years (Ada Louise Huxtable), and the first African American (Roger Wilkins), to the editorial board.

Oakes was famously out of step with his more conservative cousin, Arthur Ochs Sulzberger, who became the publisher for the Times in 1963, two years after Oakes' appointment to run the editorial page. Their most noteworthy confrontation occurred in 1976, when the Times had to decide who it would endorse as New York's junior senator in the upcoming Democratic party primary. Sulzberger wanted Daniel Patrick Moynihan, but Oakes preferred Bella Abzug. Sulzberger overruled Oakes but allowed him to write a printed rebuttal. But according to Harrison Salisbury, writing in Without Fear or Favor, Sulzberger judged Oakes' response to be too emotional and divisive. Oakes eventually had to content himself with an unprecedented one-sentence dissent, which appeared as a "Letter to the Editor"—essentially a letter to himself—on the Times editorial page on September 11, 1976, and which in its entirety read: "As Editor of the Editorial Page of The Times, I must express disagreement with the endorsement in today's editorial columns of Mr. Moynihan over four other candidates in the New York State Democratic primary contest for the United States Senate." According to the Village Voice article on Oakes' death (May 1, 2001), "the Times was credited with giving Moynihan his one percent margin of victory." Shortly afterward, Sulzberger replaced Oakes as editorial page editor with Max Frankel, who described his approach to politics, in contrast to Oakes', as "more fun." Journalist John L. Hess said on Oakes' death in 2002 that after his departure, "the editorials never recovered."

On his retirement from the editorial page, he became a contributing columnist to the op-ed page, writing primarily on domestic politics, foreign affairs, human rights, civil liberties, and the environment.

=== Areas of focus ===
In 1961, the year Oakes was appointed editor of the editorial page, Harper and Brothers published his book The Edge of Freedom: A Report on Neutralism and New Forces in Sub-saharan Africa and Eastern Europe. But his principal areas of concern were human rights and civil liberties, manifested by anti-McCarthyism and consistent support of the civil rights movement; strong and early criticism of the Vietnam War (1963), making the Times one of the few papers to take such a stand and leading to personal attacks on him by President Lyndon B. Johnson, Dean Rusk and others; and advocacy of conservation and protection of natural resources. In 1966, he was awarded the George Polk Award for bringing to the editorial page "a brilliance, an intensity and a perceptiveness" that made it "the most vital and influential journalistic voice in America."

He was nothing if not persistent. After pushing the idea for ten years with a succession of publishers, he initiated the first modern op-ed (so called because it appeared "opposite the editorial page"; the belief that the phrase stands for "opinion"-"editorial" is incorrect) page on September 21, 1970, on which the op-ed page of other American newspapers is modeled. As he wrote in introducing the page, his basic motive was to provide a window on the ideas and opinions of non-journalists. The appearance of Times columnists on the new op-ed page (limited to one or two per day in the early years) reflected merely the need to create more space for "Letters to the Editor" on the editorial page—as he later wrote, "again in the interests of broadening the opportunity for expression of outside opinion in the Times." In a 2010 interview, op-ed editor David Shipley referred to the page as Oakes' "brainchild."

== Death ==
John B. Oakes died on April 5, 2001, in Manhattan.

Wrote Hess, in his obituary, "If people think of the Times today as a great newspaper and a liberal one, it’s largely an illusion, but Oakes believed in it and tried to make it true." Oakes died on April 5, 2001, in Manhattan.

== Awards ==
In 1976, Oakes received the National Audubon Society's highest honor, the Audubon Medal. He was elected to the American Philosophical Society in 1986.

Two weeks before Oakes’ death in 2001 he was awarded a second George Polk Award, for his "lifetime achievements."

== Legacy ==
The John B. Oakes Award for Distinguished Environmental Journalism was established in 1994 by the Natural Resources Defense Council as an annual prize for print journalists; it is now administered by the Columbia University School of Journalism.
