= The Ghost Notebooks =

First edition (publ. Pantheon Books)

The Ghost Notebooks is a 2018 novel written by Ben Dolnick. It focuses on a young couple, both New Yorkers, who decide to move to the fictional town of Hibernia to live and work in the Edmund Wright Historical House.

== Plot ==
Nick Beron is a musician who works as an assistant editor in New York City and lives with his girlfriend, Hannah Rampe, in Astoria. When Hannah is laid off from her job, working at a museum, the couple enter the worst period in their relationship, constantly fighting. Nick knows that this is because Hannah is reaching a point where she would like to be engaged while he chafes at the commitment. After a particular fight in which Hannah wants to apply for a job as a museum director in Hibernia in upstate New York, Nick leaves their apartment, believing they are broken up. However he quickly returns and recommits to Hannah and the two quickly become engaged with Hannah securing the job at the Edmund Wright Historical House.

Before they leave Hannah's father warns Nick that he must be serious about his commitment to Hannah as she is emotionally fragile having suffered a nervous breakdown several years earlier.

== Reception ==
The novel received positive reviews. The New York Times praised it for going beyond "run-of-the-mill thrills and chills." The Washington Post called it an "elegant, eerie new novel". The New York Journal of Books praised it as a novel "that will leave the reader thoughtful and perhaps linger long in the memory."
