= George Oakes (journalist) =

American journalist and politician

George Washington Ochs Oakes
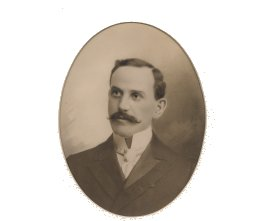

Mayor of Chattanooga
- In office 1893–1897
- Preceded by: Garnet Andrews
- Succeeded by: Edmund Watkins

Personal details
- Born: October 27, 1861 Cincinnati, Ohio
- Died: October 26, 1931 (aged 69) New York City, New York
- Resting place: Mount Sinai Cemetery; Philadelphia, Pennsylvania

George Washington Ochs Oakes (October 27, 1861 – October 26, 1931) was an American journalist. Born George Washington Ochs, he legally added the surname "Oakes" in 1915 out of outrage at the sinking of the Lusitania by a German U-boat.

== Journalism career ==
Chattanooga and Hamilton county, Tenn, by GW Ochs, 1897

Ochs was born to German-Jewish immigrants, Julius and Bertha Levy Ochs, in Cincinnati, Ohio. Brother of fellow journalist Adolph Ochs, George Oakes was educated at the University of Tennessee, where he graduated in 1879. Oakes began his career in journalism as a reporter for the Chattanooga Daily Times, of which he became general manager in 1896.

In 1900, when The New York Times decided to issue a daily edition at the Paris Exposition, Oakes was placed in charge of the enterprise; and his work met with such favor that he was decorated by the President of the French Republic with the cross of the Legion of Honor. In 1901, when The Philadelphia Times was acquired by his brother, Oakes became vice-president and general manager of the new company, and conducted the paper until its amalgamation with the Public Ledger, when he became general manager of the consolidated publications. Oakes remained publisher until the paper was sold in 1913 to Cyrus H. K. Curtis.

On the outbreak of World War I, Oakes attempted to enlist in the army, but was refused admittance due to his age. He persisted, and signed up as a private in the 9th Coast Artillery, New York National Guard, and served from 1917 until the Armistice in 1918. At this time he became the managing editor of a new New York Times-owned magazine, Current History. He also edited the Times' Mid-Week Pictorial and served on the Times Board of Directors.

== Political career ==
Oakes was a prominent figure in Tennessee politics. He attended the 1892 Democratic National Convention held in Chicago as an elected delegate, seconding on behalf of his state the nomination of Grover Cleveland; and in 1896 he was appointed delegate-at-large from Tennessee to the Palmer-Buckner Gold Democratic Convention held at Indianapolis in that year. In 1894 Oakes was elected mayor of Chattanooga, Tennessee, was reelected in 1896, and received a unanimous renomination in 1898, but declined it. He was elected vice-president and member of the executive board of the National Municipal League. For six years he held the presidency of the Chattanooga Library Association; for two years that of the Southern Associated Press; for three years that of the Chattanooga Board of Education; and for one year that of the Chattanooga Chamber of Commerce.

== See also ==
- John Bertram Oakes
- List of mayors of Chattanooga, Tennessee

== Notes ==
Preceded by Garnet Andrews	Mayor of Chattanooga, Tennessee; 1892–97	Succeeded by Edmund Watkins
