= A. G. Sulzberger =

American journalist (born 1980)

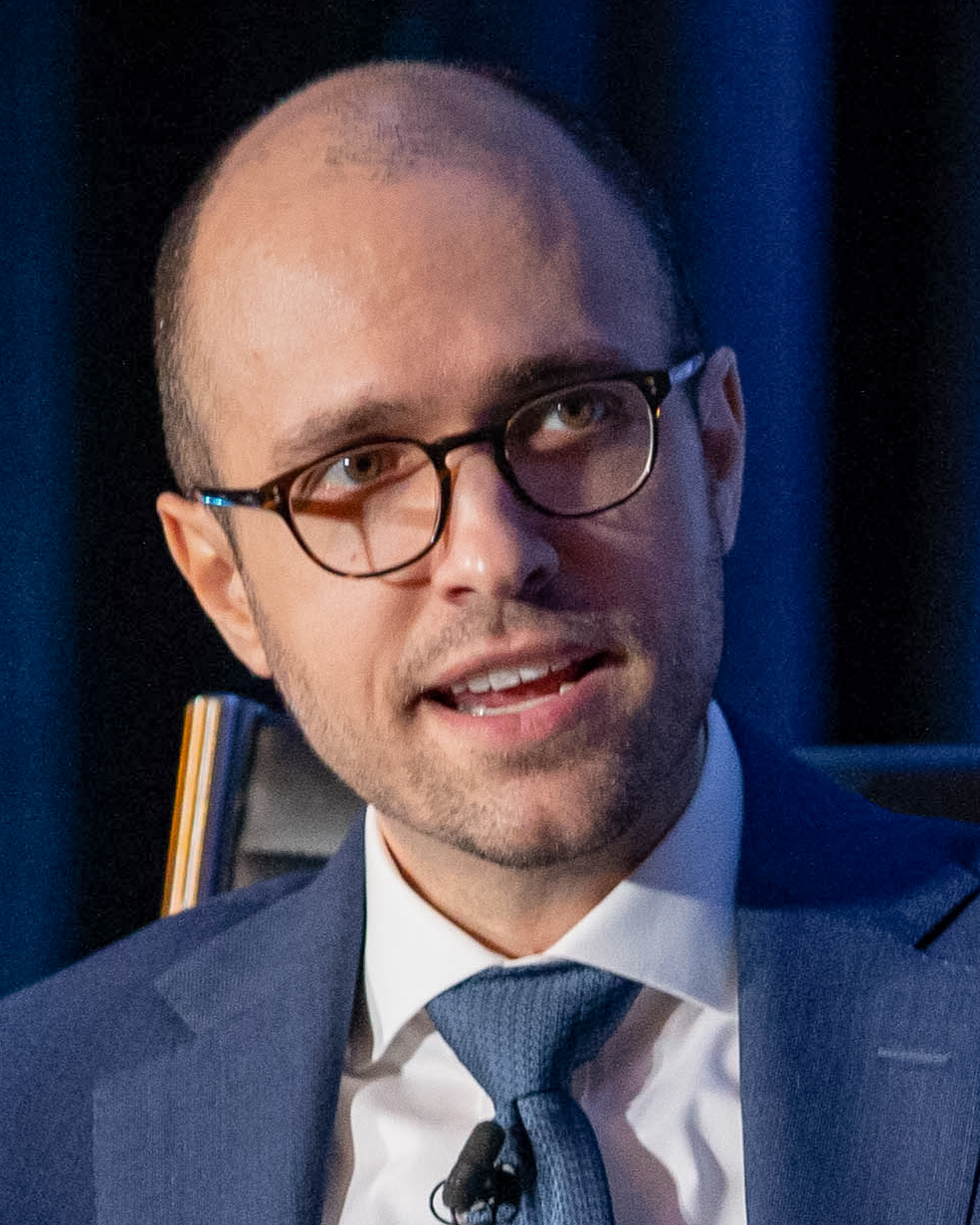
- Sulzberger in 2020
- Born: Arthur Gregg Sulzberger; August 5, 1980 (age 46); Washington, D.C., U.S.
- Education: Brown University (BA)
- Occupations: Publisher, The New York Times; Chairman, The New York Times Company
- Spouse: Molly Messick (m. 2018)
- Parents: Arthur Ochs Sulzberger Jr. (father); Gail Gregg (mother)
- Relatives: Arthur Ochs Sulzberger (grandfather); Arthur Hays Sulzberger (great-grandfather); Adolph Ochs (great-great-grandfather)

Arthur Gregg Sulzberger (born August 5, 1980) is an American journalist, chairman of the New York Times Company, and publisher of its flagship newspaper, The New York Times.

== Early life and education ==
Sulzberger was born in Washington, D.C., on August 5, 1980, to Gail Gregg and Arthur Ochs Sulzberger Jr. His paternal grandfather, Arthur Ochs Sulzberger, was Jewish, and the rest of his family is of Christian background, including Episcopalian and Congregationalist. He also has English and Scottish ancestry.

Sulzberger is a fourth-generation descendant of Adolph Ochs, who bought the New York Times in 1896. The Times has been managed and published by Adolph Ochs's family since that date.

Sulzberger attended Ethical Culture Fieldston School and Brown University, graduating in 2003 with a major in political science. At Brown, Sulzberger worked briefly for The Brown Daily Herald as a contributing writer.

== Career ==
=== Providence Journal ===
After being encouraged by Brown journalism professor Tracy Breton to apply, he interned at The Providence Journal from 2004 to 2006, working from the paper's office in Wakefield, Rhode Island. While there, he revealed that membership of the Narragansett, Rhode Island Lions Club was not open to women. Despite threats from the club to withdraw their advertising if the story ran, the Journal published Sulzberger's story. The club began admitting women a few months later.

=== The Oregonian ===
Sulzberger worked as a reporter for The Oregonian newspaper in Portland from 2006 to 2009, writing more than 300 pieces about local government and public life, including a series of investigative exposés on misconduct by Multnomah County Sheriff Bernie Giusto.

=== The New York Times ===
Sulzberger began writing for The New York Times as a metro reporter in February 2009, which published his first article on March 2. He became a national correspondent, heading the Kansas City bureau and covering the Midwest region. The 2017 film Kodachrome, directed by Mark Raso, starring Ed Harris, Jason Sudeikis, Elizabeth Olsen, and Dennis Haysbert, is based on his 2010 article about a rural community that became the last place to develop Kodachrome film.

In 2013, Sulzberger was tapped by then-executive editor Jill Abramson to lead the team that produced the Times' Innovation Report, an internal assessment of the challenges facing the Times in the digital age. He was the lead author of the 97-page report, which documented in "clinical detail" how the Times was losing ground to "nimbler competitors" and "called for revolutionary changes". The Innovation Report was leaked to BuzzFeed News in March 2014.

Sulzberger was named associate editor for newsroom strategy in August 2015. In that role, he was part of the group that outlined the Times' plan to double the news outlet's digital revenue by 2020 and increase collaboration between departments, dubbed "Our Path Forward". Women's Wear Daily credited him with having a central role in the document's creation. In October 2016, he was named deputy publisher, putting him in line to succeed his father as publisher. His cousins Sam Dolnick, now a deputy managing editor of the Times, and David Perpich, now head of standalone products and a member of the New York Times Company board, were also considered for the role.

On December 14, 2017, it was announced that Sulzberger would take over as publisher on January 1, 2018. He is the sixth member of the Ochs-Sulzberger family in the role. Though The New York Times Company is public, all voting shares are controlled by the Ochs-Sulzberger Family Trust. SEC filings state the trust's "primary objective" is that the Times continues "as an independent newspaper, entirely fearless, free of ulterior influence and unselfishly devoted to the public welfare". On his first day as publisher, Sulzberger wrote an essay noting that he was taking over in a "period of exciting innovation and growth", but also a "period of profound challenge". He committed to holding the Times "to the highest standards of independence, rigor, and fairness".

As publisher, Sulzberger oversees the news outlet's journalism and business operations. Sulzberger has been the principal architect of the news outlet's digital transformation and has led its efforts to become a subscriber-first business. He became publisher on January 1, 2018, succeeding his father Arthur Ochs Sulzberger Jr., although the elder Sulzberger remained chairman of The New York Times Company until the end of 2020. Sulzberger became the chairman of The New York Times Company on January 1, 2021.

Sulzberger met with President Donald Trump at the White House on July 20, 2018. The meeting was off-the-record, but after President Trump tweeted about it eight days later, Sulzberger "pushed back hard" to dispute the President's characterization of the meeting. Sulzberger said in a statement that at the meeting, he "told the president directly that I thought that his [anti-press] language was not just divisive but increasingly dangerous. I warned that this inflammatory language is contributing to a rise in threats against journalists and will lead to violence." Sulzberger met with President Trump in the Oval Office a second time, on January 31, 2019, for an on-the-record interview along with Times reporters Peter Baker and Maggie Haberman. He has said that an independent press "is not a liberal ideal or a progressive ideal or a Democratic ideal. It's an American ideal." In 2020, Sulzberger voiced concern about the disappearance of local news, saying that "if we don't find a path forward" for local journalism, "I believe we'll continue to watch society grow more polarized, less empathetic, more easily manipulated by powerful interests and more untethered from the truth."

The Economist published a study evidencing a gradual leftward shift in the partisan slant of The New York Times, beginning in 2017. The New York Times' former opinion section editor James Bennet, in light of the paper's Tom Cotton controversy, disagreed, saying that Times reporters have always been, on the whole, left-leaning. Rather than shifting leftward, he argued that, by catering to a partisan readership and an influx of new journalists focusing on digital content, the New York Times under A.G. Sulzberger had taken on an "illiberal bias".

A Politico report detailed that Sulzberger made a sit-down interview with President Joe Biden a priority for the newspaper, which claims to have interviewed every sitting president since Franklin D. Roosevelt. Despite efforts to secure an interview, including appeals from Sulzberger directly to Vice President Kamala Harris, the White House did not allow the Times the same level of access to Biden as it did during the first Trump Administration. An anonymous Times journalist told Politico in 2024, "All these Biden people think that the problem is Peter Baker or whatever reporter they’re mad at that day ... It's A.G. [Sulzberger], he's the one who is pissed [that] Biden hasn't done any interviews and quietly encourages all the tough reporting on his age." In a statement from The New York Times, an uncredited spokesperson responded to the story emphasizing that it "should be troubling that President Biden has so actively and effectively avoided questions from independent journalists during his term", and the paper's commitment to a free press.

Both Baker and fellow Times reporter Jonathan Swan have taken issue with Politico's reporting on Sulzberger. On social media, Baker said, "AG wants us to cover this president — and every president — as fully, fairly and aggressively as we can because that’s our role. That’s true regardless of whether we get an interview. AG takes our responsibility very seriously and is a complete straight shooter." In response, Sulzberger wrote: "James Bennet and I have always agreed on the importance of independent journalism, the challenges it faces in today's polarized world, and the mission of The Times to pursue independence even when the path of less resistance might be to give into partisan passions. But I could not disagree more strongly with the false narrative he has constructed about The Times."

Sulzberger's administration of the New York Times has been criticized for its coverage of transgender people. The paper's editorial position on the issue has been described by a former assignment editor at the international desk as being driven by Sulzberger, executive editor Joe Kahn, and managing editor Carolyn Ryan.

Sulzberger's administration of the New York Times has also been criticized for its coverage of the Gaza war. In 2024, the Journalism Academy, in a letter signed by more than 50 journalism and news media professors, called on the New York Times "to conduct a thorough and full independent review" of its processes for its December 2023 article "Screams Without Words" about sexual and gender-based violence in the October 7 attacks.

== Personal life and family ==
Through his father, Sulzberger is a grandson of Arthur Ochs "Punch" Sulzberger Sr., great-grandson of Arthur Hays Sulzberger, and great-great-grandson of Adolph Ochs. In 2018, he married Molly Messick.

== See also ==
- New Yorkers in journalism

Business positions
Preceded by Arthur O. Sulzberger, Jr.	Publisher of The New York Times Company; 2018–present	Incumbent
Preceded by Arthur O. Sulzberger, Jr.	Chairman of The New York Times Company; 2021–present	Incumbent
