= Arthur Ochs Sulzberger Jr. =

American journalist (born 1951)

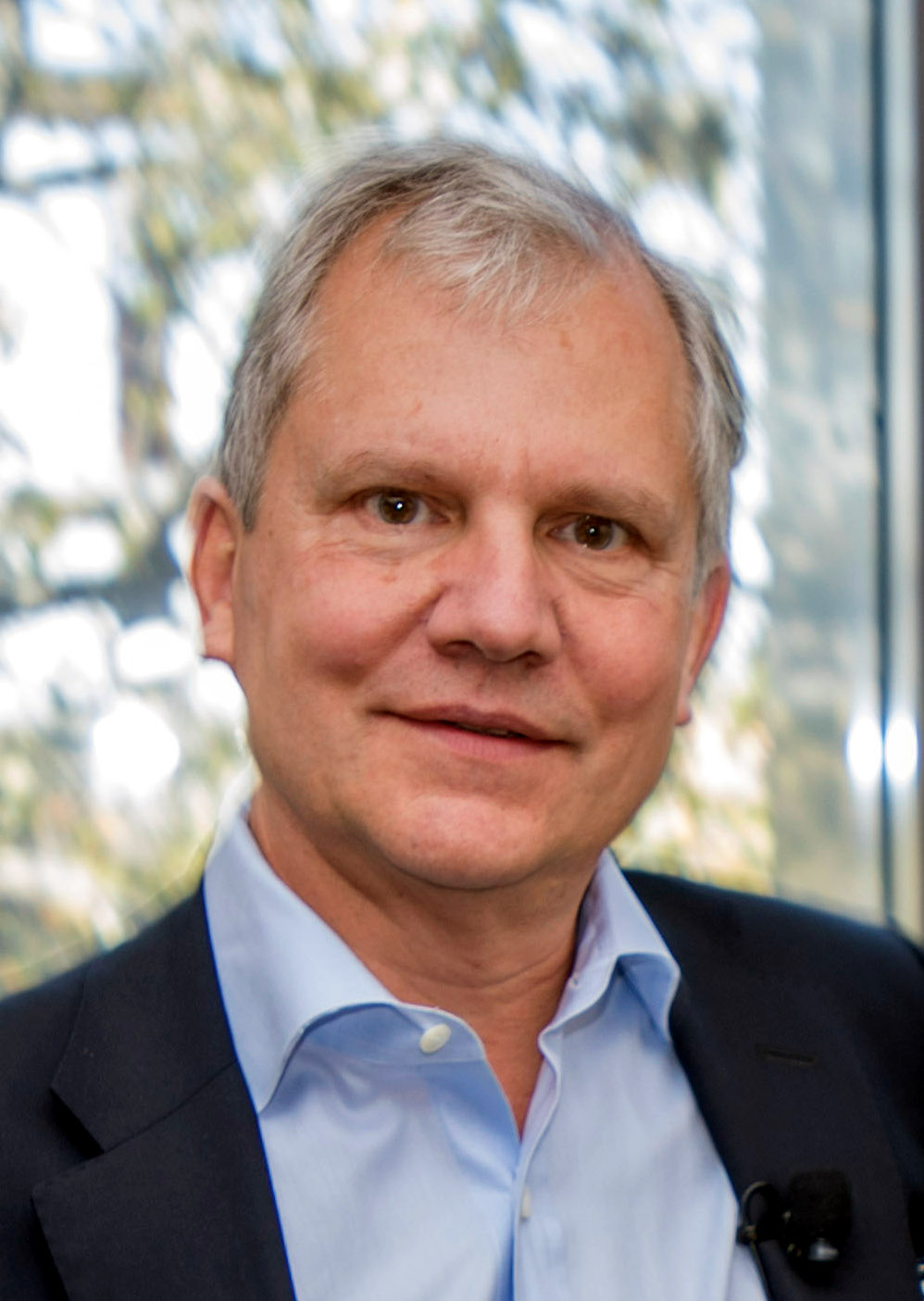
- Sulzberger in 2016
- Born: September 22, 1951 (age 75); Mount Kisco, New York, U.S.
- Education: Tufts University (BA)
- Occupations: Chairman, The New York Times Company
- Spouses: Gail Gregg (m. 1975; div. 2008) Gabrielle Greene (m. 2014; sep. 2020)
- Children: A. G. Sulzberger; Annie Sulzberger
- Parent(s): Arthur Ochs Sulzberger; Barbara Winslow Grant
- Relatives: Arthur Hays Sulzberger (grandfather); Iphigene Ochs Sulzberger (grandmother)

Arthur Ochs Sulzberger Jr. (born September 22, 1951) is an American journalist. Sulzberger was the chairman of The New York Times Company from 1997 to 2020, and the publisher of The New York Times from 1992 to 2018, when he appointed his son A. G. Sulzberger to lead the company.

== Early life and education ==
Sulzberger was born in Mount Kisco, New York, one of two children of Barbara Winslow (née Grant) and Arthur Ochs "Punch" Sulzberger Sr. His sister is Karen Alden Sulzberger, who is married to author Eric Lax. He is a grandson of Arthur Hays Sulzberger and great-grandson of Adolph Ochs. His mother was a descendant of Mayflower crew member John Alden and Plymouth Colony governor Edward Winslow.

Sulzberger's mother was of mostly English and Scottish origin and his father was of German Jewish origin (both Ashkenazic and Sephardic). Sulzberger's parents divorced when he was five years old. He was raised in his mother's Episcopal faith; however, he no longer observes any religion. Sulzberger graduated from the Browning School in New York City. In 1974, he received a Bachelor of Arts degree in political science from Tufts University.

== Career ==
Sulzberger was a reporter with the Raleigh Times in North Carolina from 1974 to 1976, and a London Correspondent for the Associated Press in the United Kingdom from 1976 to 1978.

Sulzberger joined The New York Times in 1978 as a correspondent in the Washington, D.C. bureau. He moved to New York as a metro reporter in 1981, and was appointed assistant metro editor later that year. Sulzberger is a 1985 graduate of the Harvard Business School's program for management development.

From 1983 to 1987, Sulzberger worked in a variety of business departments, including production and corporate planning. In January 1987, Sulzberger was named assistant publisher. A year later, Sulzberger was named deputy publisher, overseeing the news and business departments. In these capacities, Sulzberger was involved in planning the Times's automated color printing and distribution facilities in Edison, New Jersey, and at College Point, Queens, New York, as well as the creation of the six-section color newspaper.

Sulzberger became the publisher of The New York Times in 1992, and chairman of The New York Times Company in 1997, succeeding his father, Arthur Ochs Sulzberger. On December 14, 2017, he announced he would be ceding the post of publisher to his son, A. G. Sulzberger, effective January 1, 2018.

Sulzberger remained chairman of the Times board until December 31, 2020, when he passed that position to his son as well.

== Awards and honors ==
- 1996 - Tufts University Light on the Hill Award, Massachusetts
- 2006 - SUNY New Paltz, New York awarded an honorary doctorate of humane letters to Arthur Sulzberger Jr., chairman and publisher of The New York Times.
- 2012 - National Book Award Literarian Award for Outstanding Service to the American Literary Community
- 2017 - CUNY School of Journalism Journalistic Achievement Award at the 10th Annual Awards for Excellence in Journalism, New York

== Affiliations ==
Sulzberger played a central role in the development of the Times Square Business Improvement District, officially launched in January 1992, serving as the first chairman of that civic organization.

Sulzberger helped to found and was a two-term chairman of the New York City Outward Bound organization, and currently serves on the board of the Mohonk Preserve.

== Activism ==
Sulzberger was opposed to the Vietnam War and was arrested at protest rallies in the 1970s.

== Personal life ==
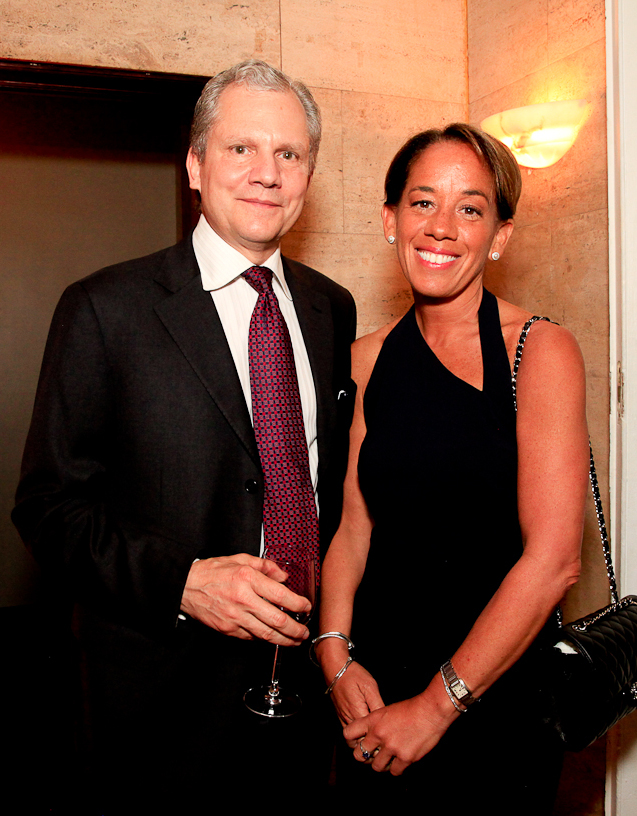
Sulzberger with Gabrielle Greene in 2013

Sulzberger married Gail Gregg in 1975, and the couple divorced in 2008. The couple has two children: a son, Arthur Gregg Sulzberger, and a daughter, Annie Sulzberger.

Sulzberger married Gabrielle Greene in 2014, and the couple filed for divorce in 2020.

Sulzberger then married Julie O’Connor on December 4, 2025.

== See also ==
- New Yorkers in journalism

Business positions
Preceded by Arthur Ochs "Punch" Sulzberger	Publisher of The New York Times Company; 1992–2017	Succeeded by A. G. Sulzberger
Preceded by Arthur Ochs "Punch" Sulzberger	Chairman of The New York Times Company; 1997–2020	Succeeded by A. G. Sulzberger
