= Edward Dolnick =

American writer (born 1952)

- Born: Edward Ishmael Dolnick; November 10, 1952 (age 73)
- Education: Brandeis University (BA)
- Occupation: Writer
- Children: Ben Dolnick; Samuel Dolnick
- Relatives: Ruth Sulzberger Holmberg (mother-in-law)

Edward Ishmael Dolnick (born November 10, 1952) is an American writer, formerly a science writer at the Boston Globe. He has been published in Atlantic Monthly, The New York Times Magazine, and The Washington Post, among other publications.

Dolnick's book The Rescue Artist: A True Story of Art, Thieves, and the Hunt for a Missing Masterpiece (2005)—an account of the 1994 theft, and eventual recovery, of Edvard Munch's The Scream from Norway's National Gallery in Oslo—won the 2006 Edgar Award in the Best Crime Fact category. His 2008 book, The Forger's Spell, describes the 1930-1940s forging of Johannes Vermeer paintings by a critic-detesting Dutch artist, accepted as "masterpieces" by art experts until the artist's confession and trial in 1945.

== Personal life ==
In 1973, he married Lynn Iphigene Golden in a Jewish ceremony in Marblehead, Massachusetts. Golden is the daughter of publisher Ruth Sulzberger Holmberg of the Ochs-Sulzberger family, publishers of The New York Times, and is on the board of The New York Times Company. The couple lives in the Washington, D.C. area and has two children: author Benjamin Dolnick and Samuel Dolnick. Samuel is an associate editor at The New York Times.

== Selected works ==
=== Books ===
- Madness on the Couch : Blaming the Victim in the Heyday of Psychoanalysis (1998)
- Down the Great Unknown : John Wesley Powell's 1869 Journey of Discovery and Tragedy Through the Grand Canyon (2001).
- The Rescue Artist: A True Story of Art, Thieves, and the Hunt for a Missing Masterpiece (2005)
- The Forger’s Spell : A True Story of Vermeer, Nazis, and the Greatest Art Hoax of the Twentieth Century (2008)
- The Clockwork Universe: Isaac Newton, the Royal Society, and the Birth of the Modern World (2011).
- The Rush: America's Fevered Quest for Fortune, 1848-1853 (2014)
- The Seeds of Life: From Aristotle to da Vinci, from Sharks' Teeth to Frogs' Pants, the Long and Strange Quest to Discover Where Babies Come From (2017)
- The Writing of the Gods: The Race to Decode the Rosetta Stone (2021)
- Dinosaurs at the Dinner Party: How an Eccentric Group of Victorians Discovered Prehistoric Creatures and Accidentally Upended the World (2024)
