= Chattanooga Times Free Press =

Newspaper in Chattanooga, Tennessee, United States

- The October 27, 2010, front page of the Chattanooga Times Free Press
- Type: Daily newspaper
- Format: Broadsheet
- Owner(s): Craig Fuller; Max Fuller
- Publisher: Eliza Hussman Gaines
- President: Ellis Smith
- Founded: Times: 1869; Free Press: 1933; Times Free Press: 1999
- Language: English
- Headquarters: 400 East 11th Street; Chattanooga, Tennessee 37403; United States
- Circulation: 12,800
- Price: $2 Daily / $3 Sunday
- Website: timesfreepress.com

The Chattanooga Times Free Press is a daily broadsheet newspaper published in Chattanooga, Tennessee, and is distributed in the metropolitan Chattanooga region of southeastern Tennessee and northwestern Georgia.

== History ==
=== Chattanooga Times ===
The Chattanooga Times was first published on December 15, 1869, by the firm Kirby & Gamble. In 1878, 20-year-old Adolph Ochs borrowed money and bought half interest in the struggling morning paper. Two years later when he assumed full ownership, it cost him $5,500. In 1892, the paper's staff moved to the Ochs Building on Georgia Avenue at East Eighth Street, which is now the Dome Building. In 1896, Ochs entrusted the management of the paper to his brother-in-law Harry C. Adler when he purchased The New York Times (circulation 20,000). Ochs remained publisher of the Chattanooga Times. Ochs' slogan, "To give the news impartially, without fear or favor" remains affixed atop the paper's mast today. The Times was controlled by the Ochs-Sulzberger family until 1999.

=== Chattanooga Free Press ===
In 1933, Roy Ketner McDonald launched a free Thursday tabloid, delivered door to door, featuring stories, comics, and advertisements for his stores. Three years later, circulation had hit 65,000 per week, making some ad revenue. On August 31, the paper began publishing as an evening daily with paid subscriptions. One year later, the Free Press circulation reached 33,000, within reach of another p.m. competitor, The Chattanooga News (circulation 35,000). McDonald acquired The Chattanooga News from George Fort Milton Jr. in December 1939, when the majority bondholders of the News, specifically Milton's step-mother Abby Crawford Milton, and her three children, acted on a technical missed payment deadline of bond payment obligations—allowing them to foreclose on the paper. Despite heroic sacrifice and fundraising by George Fort Milton and his employees, payments to the creditors were rejected as they had already agreed to sell the paper to Roy McDonald, publisher of the rival Free Press, for $150,000. McDonald then appropriated the News name to prevent Milton from using it, and the Free Press became the News-Free Press. In their guide to writing, The Elements of Style, William Strunk and E. B. White used the paper as an illustration of comically misleading punctuation, noting that the hyphen made it sound "as though the paper were news-free, or devoid of news."

=== Competition and agreement ===
By 1941, News-Free Press daily circulation reached 51,600, surpassing the Times, with 50,078. In competition, the Times began an evening newspaper competitor, the Chattanooga Evening Times. One year later, however, the competing newspapers joined business and production operations, while maintaining separate news and editorial departments. The Times ceased publishing in the evening and the News-Free Press dropped its Sunday edition. The two shared offices at 117 E. 10th St.

The longtime headquarters of the Chattanooga Times Free Press at 400 E. 11th St.

Twenty-four years later, McDonald withdrew from the agreement. He bought the Davenport Hosiery Mills building at 400 E. 11th St. in 1966, and competition resumed between the two papers. The News-Free Press was the first paper in the nation to dissolve a joint operating agreement. That August, the day after the News-Free Press resumed Sunday publication, the Times responded with an evening newspaper: the Chattanooga Post. On Feb. 25, 1970, the Post ceased publication after the U.S. filed an anti-trust suit against the paper. The News-Free Press gave Chattanooga its first full-color newspaper photos.

Each newspaper won a single Pulitzer Prize. In 1956, Charles L. Bartlett of the Washington Bureau of The Chattanooga Times won the Pulitzer Prize for National Reporting, for articles leading to the resignation of the secretary of the Air Force, Harold E. Talbott. In 1977, staff photographer Robin Hood of the Chattanooga News-Free Press received the Pulitzer Prize for Feature Photography. The photo was of legless Vietnam veteran Eddie Robinson in his wheelchair watching a rained-out parade in Chattanooga with his tiny son on his lap.

When business declined for the News-Free Press, 14 employees mortgaged their homes to help keep the newspaper afloat. In the late 1970s, Walter E. Hussman Jr., the 31-year-old publisher of the Arkansas Democrat, approached McDonald for counsel regarding a bitter struggle with the Arkansas Gazette. In 1980, the Times and the News-Free Press entered into a new joint operating agreement. In 1990, after leading the paper for 54 years, McDonald died at age 88. Three years later, the paper returned to its original name: the Chattanooga Free Press.

=== Chattanooga Times Free Press ===
In 1998, Hussman bought the Free Press. A year later, he bought the Times as well and merged the two papers. The first edition of the Chattanooga Times Free Press was published on January 5, 1999. Around half the staff from both papers were reassigned or let go within days of the merger. The Times Free Press runs two editorial pages: one staunchly liberal, the other staunchly conservative, reflecting the editorial leanings of the Times and Free Press, respectively. In 2003, Editor & Publisher magazine named the Times Free Press as one of 10 newspapers in the United States "doing it right".

In May 2013, the paper bought a new offset printing press to replace its flexography printing press. The multimillion-dollar investment added more color capability and production efficiency. On Monday, April 14, 2014, the Chattanooga Times Free Press was named a finalist for the 2014 Pulitzer Prize for Local Reporting for "Speak No Evil." In 2017, the newspaper was named a finalist for the Pulitzer Prize for "The Poverty Puzzle."

In September 2021, the newspaper started offering a free IPad to all print subscribers as a way to promote the paper's digital replica. The plan was to cease weekday print deliveries sometime in mid-2022 and only print once a week on Sundays. In-person tutorials on how to access the paper's digital edition were offered in community recreational centers, hotel conference rooms and at the newsroom. The total investment for the initiative was $6 million.

In March 2024, the newspaper sent a letter to readers announcing it had been running at a loss in recent years due in part to the COVID-19 recession in the United States and was raising subscriptions rates from $34 to $39 a month – making it one of the most expensive newspapers in the country. In 2026, the Times Free Press ceased printing physical editions on weekdays, printing only the Sunday issue. In July 2026, WEHCO Media, Inc. sold the paper to Craig Fuller, the CEO of FreightWaves, and his father Max Fuller. Fifty-four employees were laid off, including editor Alison Gerber, two other editors, plus 30 print production and distribution workers, leaving a total staff of 74. The new owners said the newspaper will no longer make use of its longtime local printing press by the end of the year. After 60 years at 400 E. 11th St., in September 2026 the newspaper moved to 412 Market St., adjacent to FreightWaves' headquarters.

== Website ==
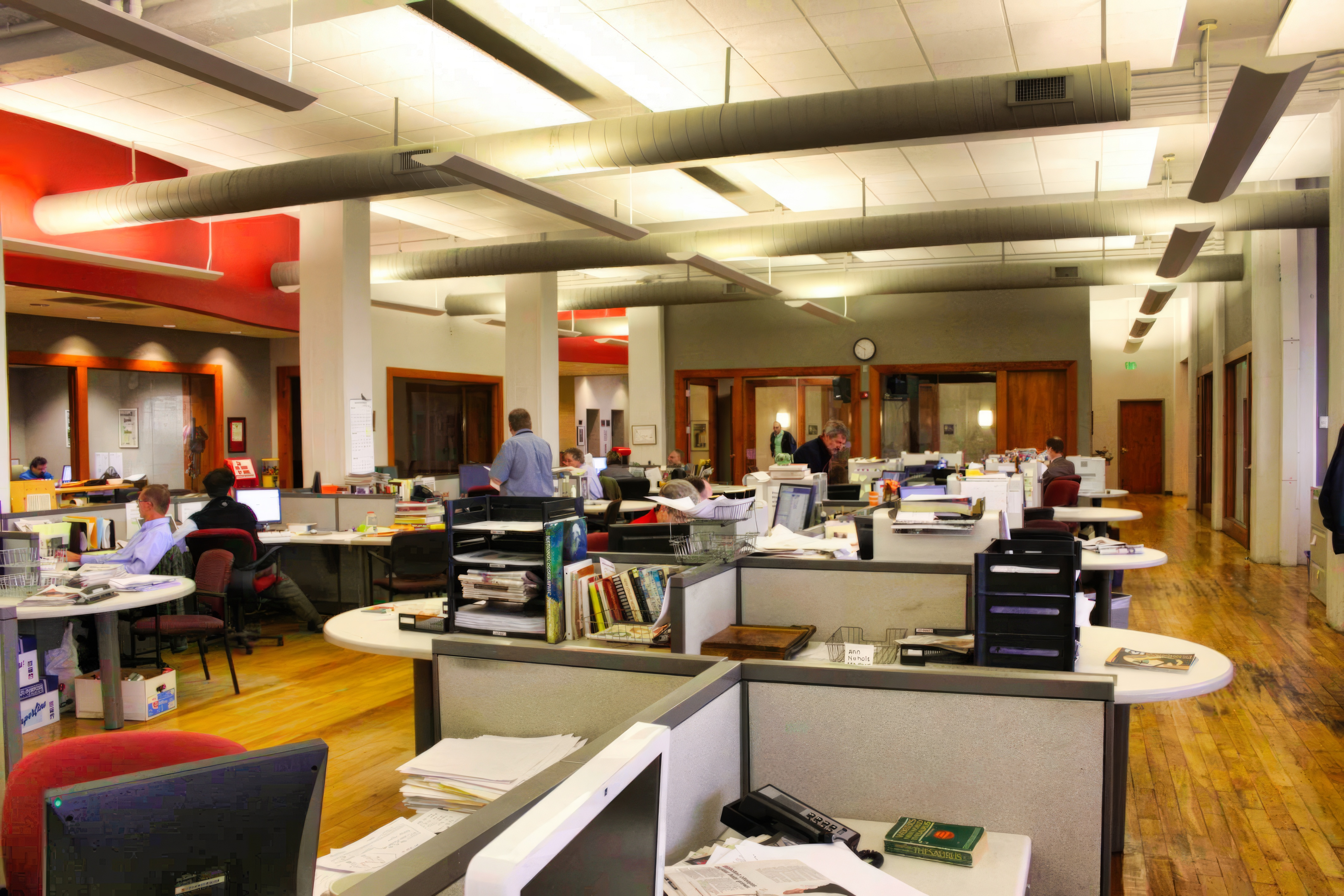
The longtime Times Free Press newsroom

When the Chattanooga Times Free Press launched its website in 2004, the site was only accessible to paid subscribers and featured only a handful of section pages and links. Four years later, in early 2008, the redesigned online presence of timesfreepress.com debuted, with an emphasis on breaking news, video and multimedia. The site features all local content in the paper, an online edition of the news product, and classified ads, as well. In late 2010, the newspaper launched "Right 2 Know", an online database of police mugshots, salaries of government employees, and a map of shootings in Hamilton County, but in August 2020, the newspaper removed the database, noting that the information published rarely met the newspaper's editorial standard of newsworthiness.

== Other publications ==
The Times Free Press is also responsible for several other niche publications:

- Chatter – a monthly magazine launched in 2008 with feature stories from around the area
- "Get Out" – a monthly magazine focused on everything outdoor in Chattanooga and the surrounding area
- "Edge" – a monthly magazine focused on local business
- Noticias Libres – a free weekly Spanish language paper distributed around the Chattanooga area
- ChattanoogaNow – a weekend publication distributed in every Thursday's Times Free Press that covers music, movies, dining and arts
- "Dining Out" – a weekly publication focused on food and restaurants

== Current and past publishers and contributors ==
- Julius Ochs Adler, president and publisher, The Chattanooga Times and general manager of The New York Times until 1955.
- Charles L. Bartlett, reporter, Washington bureau, The Chattanooga Times, 1946–1962. Pulitzer Prize winner for national reporting, 1956, for articles leading to the resignation of Secretary of the Air Force Harold E. Talbott.
- Clay Bennett, editorial cartoonist, combined papers, 2007–present. Pulitzer Prize winner for editorial cartooning in 2002 at the Christian Science Monitor.
- Bill Dedman, copy boy, copy editor, reporter for The Chattanooga News-Free Press and then The Chattanooga Times, 1977–1983. Pulitzer Prize winner, investigative reporting, 1989.
- Jeff Deloach, immediate past president.
- J. Todd Foster, editor, combined papers, 2010–2011. Editor of the Bristol Herald-Courier when it won the 2010 Pulitzer Prize for Public Service.
- Tom Griscom, executive editor and publisher, combined papers, 1999–2010.
- Ruth Sulzberger Holmberg, publisher, The Chattanooga Times. Granddaughter of Adolph Ochs, and mother of author Arthur Golden and Michael Golden, publisher of the International Herald Tribune.
- Robin Hood, photographer, The Chattanooga News-Free Press, 1970s. Pulitzer Prize winner for feature photography, 1977.
- Drew Johnson, editorial page editor.
- Roy McDonald, publisher, The Chattanooga Free Press and later The Chattanooga News-Free Press, 1933–1990.
- Jon Meacham, reporter, The Chattanooga Times, 1991–1992. Pulitzer Prize winner for biography, 2009.
- Albert Hodges Morehead, reporter, The Chattanooga Times, c. 1930.
- Alan Murray, reporter, The Chattanooga Times, c. 1977. Assistant managing editor and columnist, The Wall Street Journal.
- Adolph Ochs, publisher, The Chattanooga Times, 1878–1935. Later publisher of The New York Times. Died on a visit to Chattanooga.

== See also ==
- List of newspapers in Tennessee
