= Cyrus Leopold Sulzberger =

American merchant and philanthropist

Cyrus L. Sulzberger
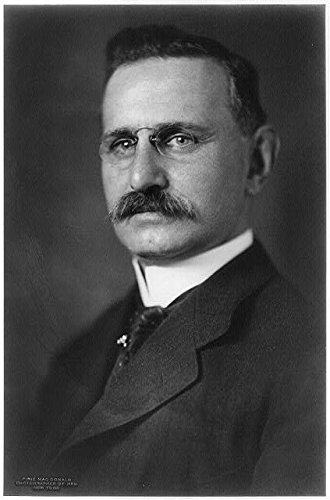
- Sulzberger circa 1900-1910
- Born: July 11, 1858; Philadelphia, Pennsylvania, U.S.
- Died: April 30, 1932 (aged 73); New York City, U.S.
- Occupation(s): Merchant; Philanthropist
- Spouse: Rachel Peixotto Hays
- Children: Arthur Hays Sulzberger

Cyrus Leopold "Leo" Sulzberger (aka Cyrus Lindauer Sulzberger; July 11, 1858 – April 30, 1932) was an American merchant and philanthropist. He was president of the Jewish Agricultural and Industrial Aid Society.

== Early life ==
Sulzberger was born in Philadelphia, Pennsylvania, to Leopold Sulzberger (1805–1881) and Sophia Lindauer (1830–1909). Leopold had a brother Abraham Sulzberger (1810–1880) and they both migrated from Heidelsheim, Bruchsal, Grand Duchy of Baden to Philadelphia.

Sulzberger was educated at the Hebrew Education Society, and the Philadelphia Central High School.

== Zionism ==
Sulzberger attended the First Zionist Congress in Basel, Switzerland in 1895 as one of five American delegates.

Later that year, in November, he attended a debate held by the New York Judeans. Sulzberger spoke as an anti-Zionist, questioning what kind of government could be run by people from Russia, Bulgaria and similar countries.

Later, Sulzberger became a Zionist.

== Personal life ==
Sulzberger married Rachel Peixotto Hays and had several children including, Arthur Hays Sulzberger. Cyrus L Sulzberger died on April 30, 1932, in Manhattan, New York City.
