= Andrew Heiskell =

American journalist

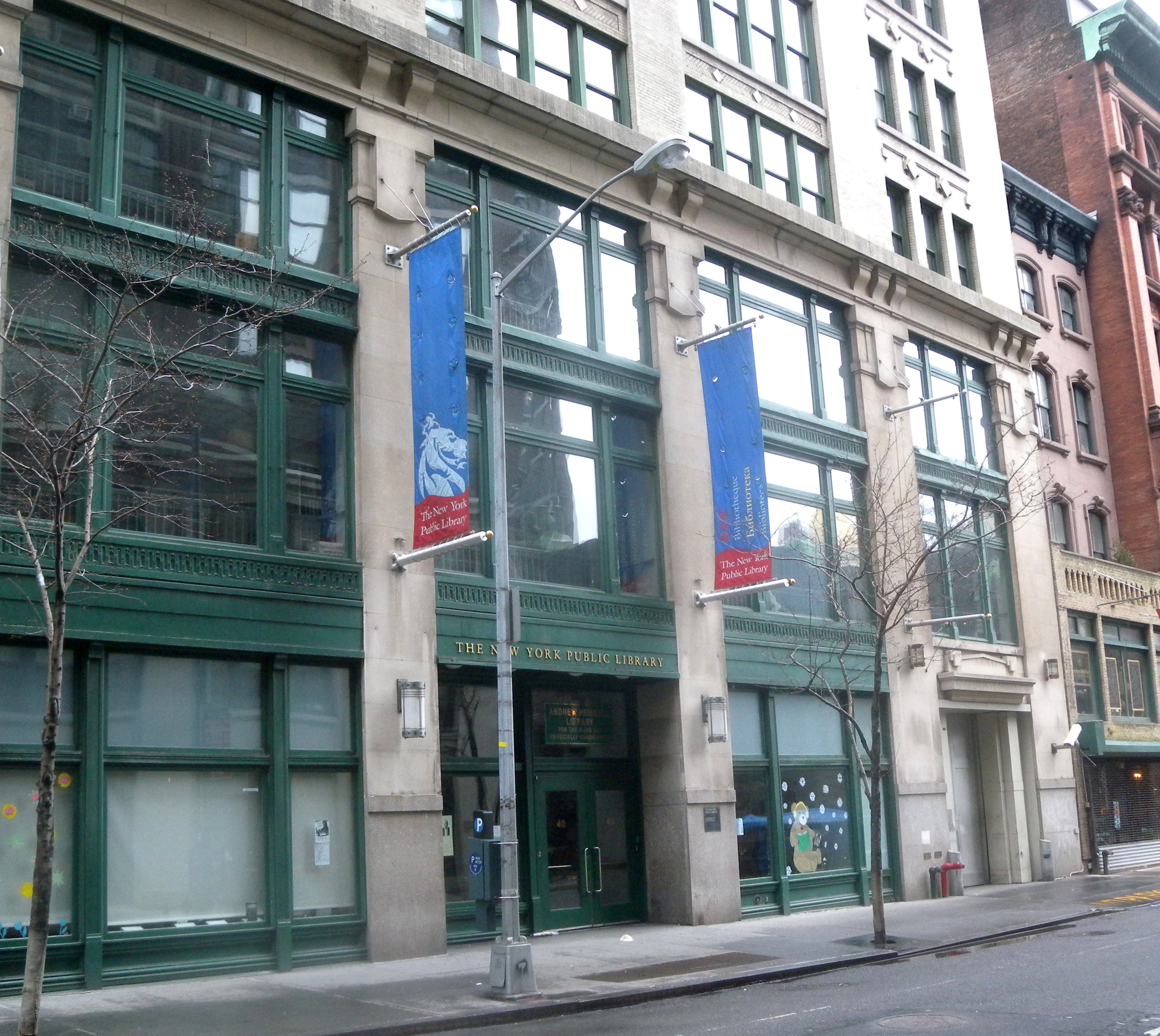
- Looking west across West 20th St at Heiskell Library for the Blind on a cloudy morning. ZIP 10011.

Chairman, Time, Inc.
- In office 1960–1980

Personal details
- Born: September 13, 1915 Naples, Italy
- Died: July 6, 2003 (aged 87) Darien, Connecticut, U.S.
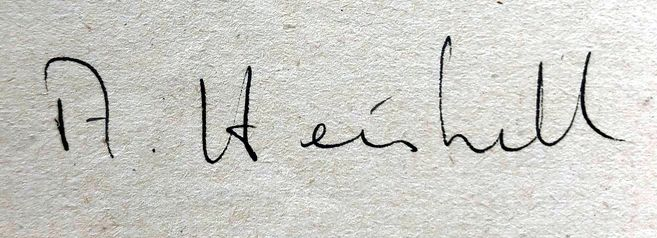
- Signature

Andrew Heiskell (September 13, 1915 – July 6, 2003) was chairman and CEO of Time Inc. (1960–1980), and also known for his philanthropy, for organizations including the New York Public Library, the revitalization of New York's Bryant Park, the Urban Coalition, Enterprise Foundation, and the American Academy in Rome. He cofounded People for the American Way and was president of the Inter American Press Association (1961–1962) and president of the Harvard University Board of Overseers.

== Biography ==
Heiskell was born in Naples, the second child of American parents, Ann Moore Hubbard and Morgan Ott Heiskell. His father was an artist and photographer whose work appeared in National Geographic. His parents had married in Wheeling, West Virginia and then moved to Capri, where they became part of a bohemian set of expatriates, including the writer Compton Mackenzie, with whom his mother was rumored to have had an affair. After his parents split up, he spent his childhood in Europe with his mother and sister.

He was hired as a science editor at Life in 1937, at the age of 22. The magazine itself was only six months old. Because he was a fluent French speaker, he was sent to the magazine's Paris bureau and reported on the war in France. In 1946, aged just 30, he was named the magazine's publisher. He spent 43 years at Time Inc., 20 of them as chairman and CEO. In 1972 he had to close down Life. In 1974 he created People, which rapidly became a great asset.

The Institute of International Education's Andrew Heiskell Award is named for him, as it the Andrew Heiskell Braille and Talking Book Library branch of NYPL. Heiskell donated funds to pay for the Arts Director position at the American Academy in Rome.

One of his major achievements as a civic leader was the revitalization of New York's Bryant Park, which he undertook after time as chair of the New York Public Library. He was for ten years an overseer of Harvard University, after attending Harvard Business School without ever earning an undergraduate degree.

== Personal life ==
Noted for his charm and height (he was 6'5"), Heiskell was married three times. His first wife was Cornelia Scott, and they had two children, Diane and Peter. His second wife was the Hollywood actress Madeleine Carroll, with whom he had a daughter, Anne Madeleine. His third, and longest, marriage was to the newspaper executive and philanthropist Marian Sulzberger Dryfoos, the widow of New York Times publisher Orvil Dryfoos, to whom he was married from 1965 on.

== Books ==
- Andrew Heiskell with Ralph Graves (1997), Outsider, Insider: An Unlikely Success Story, Marian-Darien Press, ISBN 0-9668271-0-4
