= Adolph Ochs =

American newspaper publisher (1858–1935)

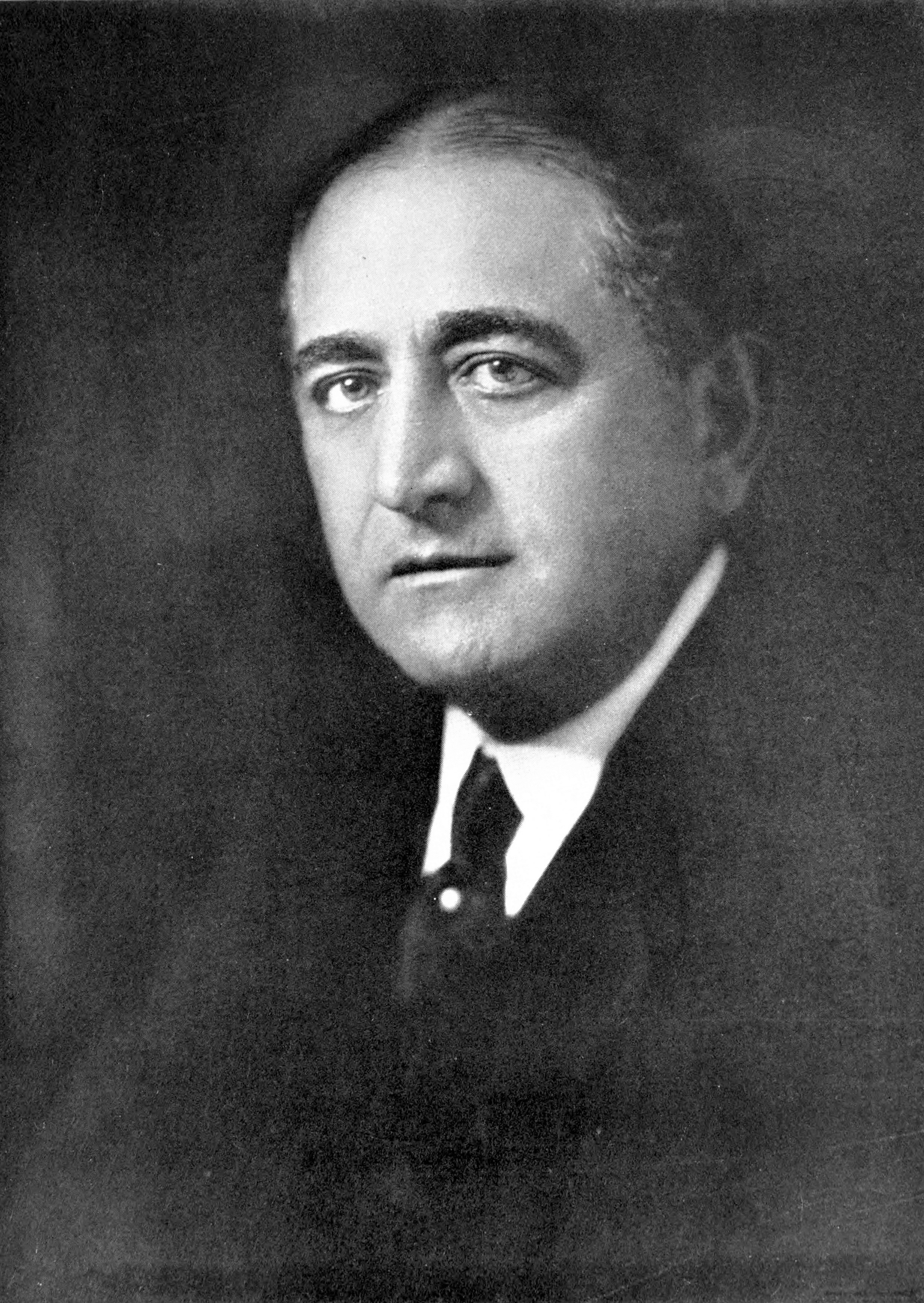
- Born: Adolph Simon Ochs; March 12, 1858; Cincinnati, Ohio, U.S.
- Died: April 8, 1935 (aged 77); Chattanooga, Tennessee, U.S.
- Burial place: Temple Israel Cemetery, Hastings-on-Hudson, New York, U.S.
- Occupation: Publisher
- Spouse: Effie Wise
- Children: Iphigene Ochs Sulzberger

Signature
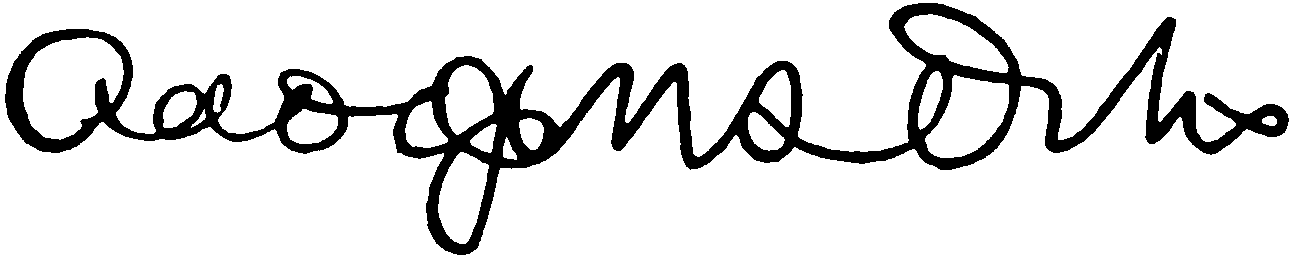

Adolph Simon Ochs (March 12, 1858 – April 8, 1935) was an American newspaper publisher and owner of The New York Times and The Chattanooga Times, which is now the Chattanooga Times Free Press. Through his only child, Iphigene Ochs Sulzberger, and her husband Arthur Hays Sulzberger, Ochs's descendants continue to publish The New York Times through the present day.

== Early life and education ==
Ochs was born in Cincinnati, Ohio, on March 12, 1858, to Julius Ochs and Bertha Levy, both German Jewish immigrants. His father had left Bavaria for the United States in 1846. Julius was a highly educated man, fluent in six languages, and he taught at schools throughout the South. He supported the Union during the Civil War. Ochs' mother Bertha came to the United States in 1848, fleeing the German Revolutions in Rhenish Bavaria, and lived in the South prior to her 1853 marriage to Julius. She sympathized with the Confederacy during the American Civil War, but the conflicting sympathies between husband and wife did not separate their household.

Following the end of the Civil War, the family moved to Knoxville, Tennessee, in the eastern, Union-affiliated part of the state. In Knoxville, Adolph studied in the public schools. During his spare time, he delivered newspapers.

== Career ==
At age 11, Ochs went to work at the Knoxville Chronicle as an office assistant to the newspaper's editor, William Rule, who became a mentor. In 1871, Ochs worked as a grocer's clerk in Providence, Rhode Island, while attending night school. He returned to Knoxville, where he was an apprentice to a pharmacist for some time.

In 1872, Ochs returned to the Chronicle as a printer's devil, who looked after various details in the composing room of the newspaper. His siblings also worked at the newspaper to supplement the income of their father, a lay religious leader for Knoxville's small Jewish community. The Chronicle was the only Republican, pro-Reconstruction, newspaper in the city, but Ochs counted Father Ryan, the Poet-Priest of the Confederacy, among his customers.

=== Chattanooga Times ===
In 1877, at age 19, Ochs borrowed $250 from his family (equivalent to $7,600 in 2025) to purchase a controlling interest in the Chattanooga Times, becoming its publisher.

The following year, he founded a commercial paper that he called The Tradesman. He was one of the founders of the Southern Associated Press and served as president.

=== The New York Times ===
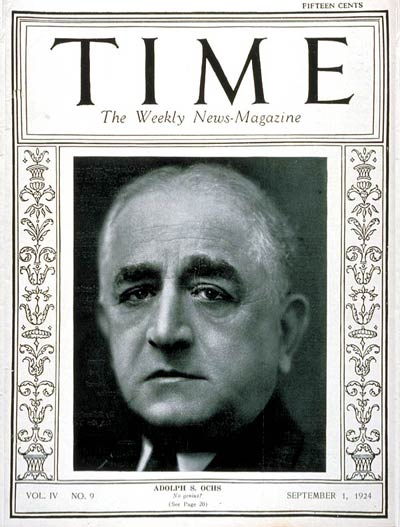
Ochs on the September 1, 1924, cover of Time magazine

In 1896, at the age of 38, he was advised by The New York Times reporter Henry Alloway that the paper could be bought at a greatly reduced price due to its financial losses and wide range of competitors in New York City.

After borrowing money to purchase the Times for $75,000, Ochs formed the New York Times Company, placed the paper on a strong financial foundation, and became the majority stockholder.

In 1904, Ochs hired Carr Van Anda as his managing editor. They focused on objective journalism at a time when newspapers were openly and highly partisan. They also decreased the newspaper's cost from 3 cents per issue to 1 cent, which led to the newspaper's survival. The newspaper's readership increased from 9,000 at the time of his purchase to 780,000 by the 1920s. He also added the Times' well-known masthead motto: "All the News That's Fit to Print".

In 1904, Ochs moved The New York Times to a newly built building on Longacre Square in Manhattan, which the City of New York then renamed as Times Square.

On New Year's Eve 1904, Ochs had pyrotechnists illuminate his new building at One Times Square with a fireworks show from street level.

Beginning with 1896, there was issued weekly a supplement, eventually called The New York Times Book Review and Magazine. Other auxiliary publications were incrementally added, including The Annalist, a financial review appearing on Mondays, The Times Mid-Week Pictorial on Thursdays, Current History Magazine, a monthly, started during World War I, The New York Times Index, started in 1913, published quarterly, and comparable only to the Index, published by The Times in London.

On August 18, 1921, the 25th anniversary of reorganization, The New York Times employed 1,885 people. It was classified as an independent Democratic publication, and consistently opposed William Jennings Bryan in his presidential campaigns. By its fairness in the presentation of news, editorial moderation and ample foreign service, it secured a high place in American journalism, becoming widely read and influential throughout the United States.

=== Philadelphia Public Ledger ===
In 1901, Ochs became proprietor and editor of the Philadelphia Times, which was later merged into the Philadelphia Public Ledger. Ochs was the sole owner of the Philadelphia-based newspaper from 1902 to 1912, when he sold it to Cyrus H. K. Curtis.

According to Wolfgang Disch, (Note: Wolfgang K. A. Disch wrote several books on the topic of marketing, mostly in German, including a bibliography.)

In 1916, Ochs communicated one of his most famous quotes, saying, "I affirm that more than 50% of money spent on advertising is squandered and is a sheer waste of printers' ink." The quote might be the origin of the common marketing saying, "I know half the money I spend on advertising is wasted, but I can never find out which half", a quote that has been attributed to John Wanamaker.

Ochs was elected to the American Philosophical Society in 1931.

== Personal life ==
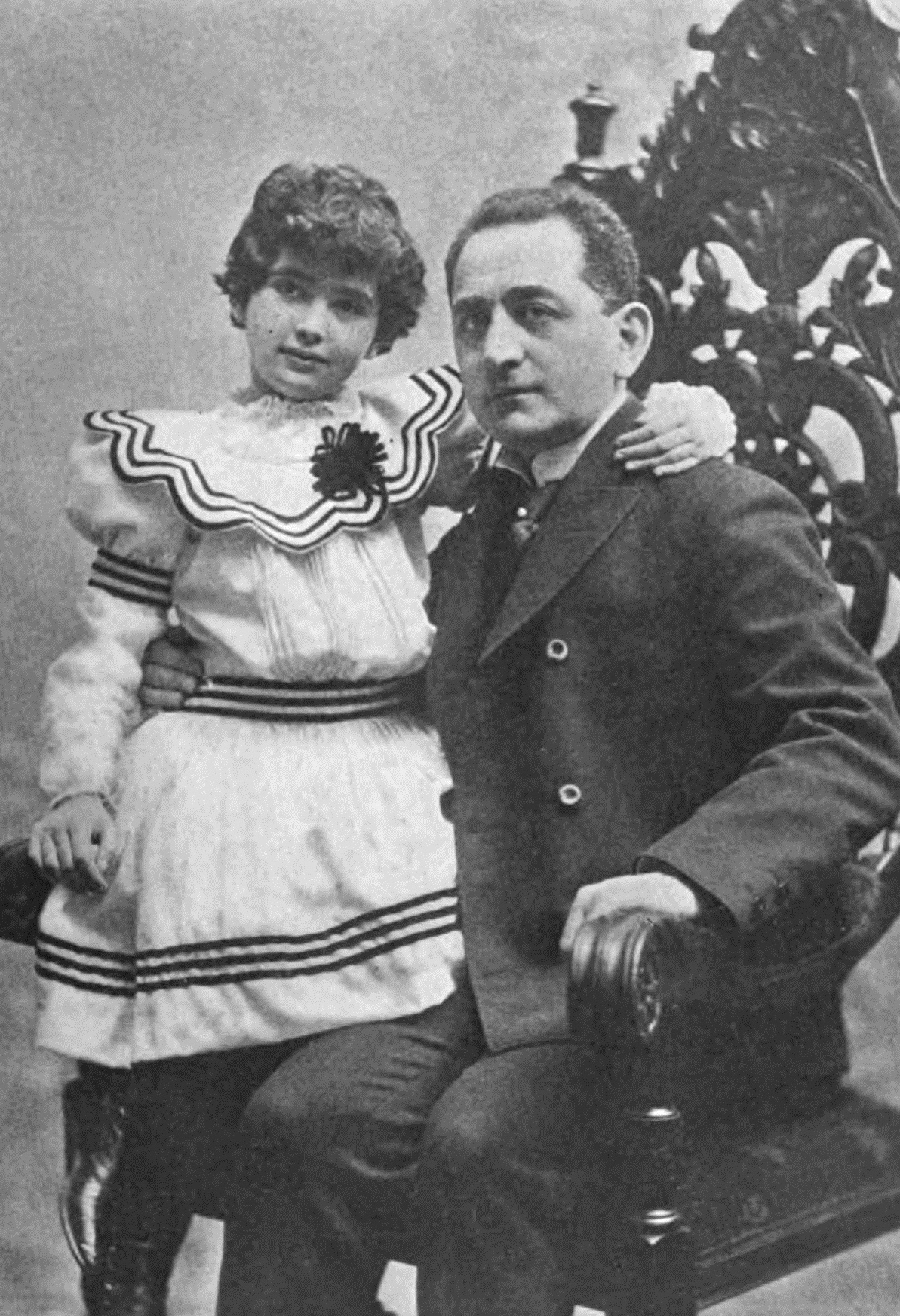
Ochs and his daughter, Iphigene, c. 1902

In 1884, Ochs married Effie Wise, a daughter of Rabbi Isaac Mayer Wise of Cincinnati, who was the leading exponent of Reform Judaism in the United States, and the founder of Hebrew Union College.

In 1928, Ochs built the Mizpah Congregation Temple in Chattanooga, Tennessee, in memory of his parents, Julius and Bertha Ochs. The Georgian colonial building was designated as a Tennessee Historical Preservation Site in 1979.

Ochs fought antisemitism during his career. He was active in the early years of the Anti-Defamation League, where he served as an executive board member, and used his influence as publisher of The New York Times to convince other newspapers nationwide to cease the unjustified caricaturing and lampooning of Jews in the American media.

Ochs was an opponent of a Jewish state in Palestine.

Ochs was the uncle of World War II major general Julius Ochs Adler.

== Death ==
Ochs died on April 8, 1935, during a visit to Chattanooga, Tennessee. He is buried at the Temple Israel Cemetery in Hastings-on-Hudson in Westchester County, New York.

== Legacy ==
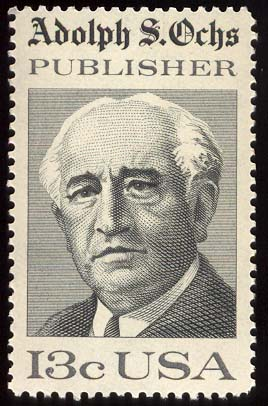
A 1976 United States Postal Service stamp commemorating Ochs

Ochs' daughter, Iphigene Bertha Ochs, married Arthur Hays Sulzberger, who became publisher of The New York Times following his death. Her son-in-law, Orvil Dryfoos, was publisher of The New York Times from 1961 to 1963, and he was succeeded by her son, Arthur Ochs Sulzberger. Her daughter, Ruth Holmberg, became publisher of The Chattanooga Times. Ruth Holmberg's son, Arthur Golden, authored Memoirs of a Geisha. Arthur Ochs Sulzberger Jr. served as publisher of The New York Times from 1992 until 2017, when he was succeeded by his own son, A. G. Sulzberger.

One of Ochs's nephews, Julius Ochs Adler, worked at The New York Times for more than 40 years, becoming general manager in 1935, after Ochs died. Another nephew, John Bertram Oakes, the son of his brother George Washington Ochs Oakes, in 1961 became editor of its editorial page, a position he held until 1976. Ochs was inducted into the Junior Achievement U.S. Business Hall of Fame in 1982. Another nephew, Adolph Shelby Ochs, was treasurer and a director of The Chattanooga Times. He was married to Mrs. Theodosia Fitzgerald Gray of Danville, Virginia, granddaughter of Dan River Inc. founder T.B. Fitzgerald, niece of Wachovia Bank founder James Alexander Gray and cousin of Bowman Gray Sr., former president and chairman of R. J. Reynolds.

== Notes ==
Business positions
Preceded by Business acquired from George F. Spinney	The New York Times Company Publisher; 1896–1935	Succeeded by Arthur Hays Sulzberger
Awards and achievements
Preceded by Edith Cummings	Cover of Time magazine 1 September 1924	Succeeded by Wu Pei-fu
