= Arthur Golden =

American author known for writing 'Memoirs of a Geisha'

- Born: December 6, 1956 (age 69); Chattanooga, Tennessee, U.S.
- Occupation: Writer
- Spouse: Gertrude "Trudy" Legge (1982–present)
- Children: 2
- Relatives: Ruth Sulzberger Holmberg (mother); Arthur Hays Sulzberger (grandfather); Adolph Ochs (great grandfather)
- Writing career
- Period: 20th century
- Genre: Historical fiction

Arthur Sulzberger Golden (born December 6, 1956) is an American writer. He is the author of the bestselling novel Memoirs of a Geisha (1997).

== Early life ==
Golden was born in Chattanooga, Tennessee, the son of Ruth (née Sulzberger) and Ben Hale Golden. His mother was Jewish. His father was not. Through his mother he is a member of the Ochs-Sulzberger family. His mother was a daughter of long-time New York Times publisher Arthur Hays Sulzberger and granddaughter of New York Times owner and publisher Adolph Ochs. His parents divorced when he was eight years old. His father died five years later. He was raised in Lookout Mountain, Georgia and attended Lookout Mountain Elementary School in Lookout Mountain, Tennessee.

Golden spent his middle and high school years at the Baylor School (then a boys-only school for day and boarding students) in Chattanooga, graduating in 1974 before attending Harvard University and receiving a degree in art history, specializing in Japanese art. In 1980, he earned an M.A. in Japanese history at Columbia University, and also learned Mandarin Chinese. After a summer at Peking University in Beijing, China, Golden worked in Tokyo, before returning to the United States, where he earned an M.A. in English at Boston University.

== Career ==
Golden's most well-known novel, Memoirs of a Geisha, was written over a six-year period. The novel was re-written in its entirety three times during its development. Golden changed the point of view with each re-write, eventually settling on Sayuri's perspective.

During research for the novel, Golden conducted interviews with a number of geisha, including famous ex-geisha Mineko Iwasaki. After the Japanese edition of the novel was published, Golden was sued by Iwasaki for breach of contract and defamation of character, with Iwasaki alleging that Golden had agreed to protect her anonymity if she was interviewed about her life as a geisha, due to the traditional code of silence held between geisha in regard to their clients. The lawsuit was settled out of court in February 2003.

After its release in 1997, Memoirs of a Geisha spent two years on the New York Times bestseller list. It has sold more than four million copies in English and has been translated into thirty-two languages around the world. In 2005, Memoirs of a Geisha was made into a feature film, starring Ziyi Zhang, Michelle Yeoh, Gong Li, and Ken Watanabe. The film was directed by Rob Marshall, and garnered three Academy Awards.

In 2000, Golden received the Golden Plate Award of the American Academy of Achievement.

He is a member of the board of directors of the New York Times.

== Personal life ==
Golden is married to Trudy Legge; they have two children. Golden currently lives in South Dartmouth, Massachusetts.
