= Arthur Hays Sulzberger =

Publisher of The New York Times from 1935 to 1961

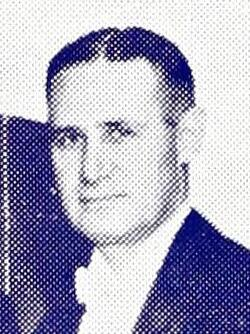
- Sulzberger c. 1938
- Born: September 12, 1891; New York City, U.S.
- Died: December 11, 1968 (aged 77); New York City, U.S.
- Education: Columbia University (BA)
- Occupation: Newspaper publisher
- Spouse: Iphigene Bertha Ochs
- Children: Marian Sulzberger Heiskell; Ruth Sulzberger Golden Holmberg; Judith Sulzberger Levinson; Arthur Ochs Sulzberger
- Parent(s): Cyrus Leopold Sulzberger; Rachel Peixotto Hays
- Family: Arthur Golden (grandson); Ben Dolnick (great-grandson); Cyrus Leo Sulzberger II (nephew)

Arthur Hays Sulzberger (September 12, 1891 – December 11, 1968) was publisher of The New York Times from 1935 to 1961. During that time, daily circulation rose from 465,000 to 713,000 and Sunday circulation from 745,000 to 1.4 million; the staff more than doubled, reaching 5,200; advertising linage grew from 19 million to 62 million column inches per year; and gross income increased almost sevenfold, reaching $117 million.

== Early life and education ==
Sulzberger was born in New York City, on September 12, 1891. His parents were Cyrus Leopold Sulzberger, a cotton-goods merchant, and Rachel Peixotto Hays. They came from old Jewish families, Ashkenazi and Sephardic, respectively. His great-great-grandfather, Benjamin Seixas, brother of the famous rabbi and American Revolutionary Gershom Mendes Seixas of Congregation Shearith Israel, was one of the founders of the New York Stock Exchange. His great-grandfather, Dr. Daniel Levy Maduro Peixotto, was a prominent physician and director of Columbia University's Medical College and a member of the Philolexian Society. His great-granduncle was Jacob Hays, the High Constable of New York from 1801 to 1850.

In 1909, Sulzberger graduated from Horace Mann School. In 1913, he graduated from Columbia College.

== Career ==
In 1918, Sulzberger began working at The New York Times, and became publisher when his father-in-law, Adolph Ochs, the previous Times publisher, died in 1935. In 1929, he founded Columbia's original Jewish Advisory Board and served on the board of what became Columbia-Barnard Hillel for many years. He served as a university trustee from 1944 to 1959 and is honored with a floor at the journalism school. He also served as a trustee of the Rockefeller Foundation from 1939 to 1957. He was elected a Fellow of the American Academy of Arts and Sciences in 1950. In 1954, Sulzberger received The Hundred Year Association of New York's Gold Medal Award "in recognition of outstanding contributions to the City of New York."

Carl Bernstein's 1977 exposé of the media's CIA ties noted that "Sulzberger signed a secrecy agreement with the CIA in the 1950s, according to CIA officials—a fact confirmed by his nephew, C. L. Sulzberger."

In 1956, Sulzberger received the Elijah Parish Lovejoy Award as well as an honorary Doctor of Laws degree from Colby College.

In 1961, he was succeeded as publisher first by son-in-law Orvil Dryfoos, then, two years later in 1963, by his son Arthur Ochs "Punch" Sulzberger.

Sulzberger broadened the Times' use of background reporting, pictures, and feature articles, and expanded its sections. He supervised the development of facsimile transmission for photographs and built the Times radio station, WQXR, into a leading vehicle for news and music. Under Sulzberger the Times began to publish editions in Paris and Los Angeles with remote-control typesetting machines.

Sulzberger is credited with the quote: "We journalists tell the public which way the cat is jumping. The public will take care of the cat."

== Anti-Zionism ==
A practicing Reform Jew, Sulzberger was an enthusiastic supporter of the American Council for Judaism, founded in June 1942 to oppose Zionism, giving it prominent coverage in his newspaper. In a 1946 speech, Sulzberger stated that Zionism was to blame for some of the Jewish deaths in the Holocaust, and that the refugee crisis during the war had been "a manageable, social and economic problem" until "the clamor for statehood introduced an insoluble political element" into the issue. He added it was his judgment that "thousands dead might now be alive" had Zionists put "less emphasis on statehood".

His stand against Zionism and a Jewish state of Israel on principle has been accused by Laurel Leff in her 2005 book Buried by the Times of deliberately burying accounts of Nazi atrocities against Jews in the back pages of the Times. She alleges that Sulzberger went out of his way to play down the special victimhood of Jews and withheld support for specific rescue programs for European Jews.

== Personal life ==
In 1917, he married Iphigene Bertha Ochs, the daughter of Adolph Ochs and Effie Wise (a daughter of Rabbi Isaac Mayer Wise). They had four children: Marian Sulzberger Heiskell (1918–2019), widow first of Times publisher Orvil Dryfoos and then of Time Inc. chairman Andrew Heiskell; Ruth Sulzberger Holmberg (1921–2017), publisher of the Chattanooga Times, married and divorced from Ben Hale Golden; Judith Sulzberger (1923–2011), physician, married Matthew Rosenschein Jr. (divorced), Dick Cohen (divorced), and Budd Levinson; and Arthur Ochs Sulzberger (1926–2012).

== Death ==
Sulzberger died December 11, 1968, in New York City.

== See also ==
- List of people from Harlem

Business positions
Preceded by Adolph Ochs	The New York Times Company Publisher; 1935–1961	Succeeded by Orvil Dryfoos
