= Arthur Ochs Sulzberger =

American businessman (1926–2012)

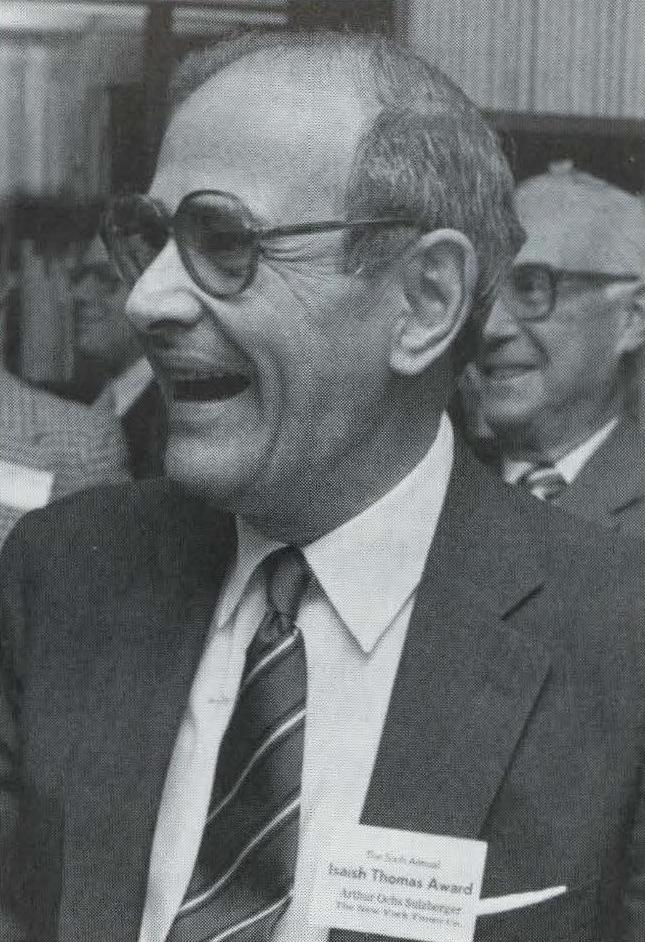
- Sulzberger in 1984
- Born: February 5, 1926; New York City, U.S.
- Died: September 29, 2012 (aged 86); Southampton, New York, U.S.
- Other name: Punch Sulzberger
- Education: Columbia University (BA)
- Occupation: Newspaper publisher
- Years active: 1963–1997
- Spouses: Barbara Winslow Grant (m. 1948; div. 1956) Carol Fox Fuhrman (m. 1956; died 1995) Allison S. Cowles (m. 1996; died 2010)
- Children: 4, including Arthur Jr.
- Parent(s): Arthur Hays Sulzberger; Iphigene Bertha Ochs
- Relatives: Adolph Ochs (grandfather); Isaac Mayer Wise (great-grandfather)
- Awards: Pulitzer Prize
- Military career
- Allegiance: United States
- Branch: United States Marine Corps
- Service years: 1944–1952
- Conflicts: World War II; Korean War

Arthur Ochs Sulzberger Sr. (February 5, 1926 – September 29, 2012) was an American publisher and a businessman. Born into a prominent media and publishing family, Sulzberger became publisher of The New York Times in 1963 and chairman of the board of The New York Times Company in 1973. Sulzberger relinquished to his son, Arthur Ochs Sulzberger Jr., the office of publisher in 1992, and the board chairmanship in 1997.

== Early life and education ==
Sulzberger was born to a Jewish family on February 5, 1926, in New York City, the son of Arthur Hays Sulzberger and Iphigene Bertha Ochs (daughter of Adolph Ochs, the former publisher and owner of The New York Times and the Chattanooga Times and granddaughter of Rabbi Isaac Mayer Wise). He had a sister named Judy, which gave rise to his nickname, "Punch", in reference to the British traditional puppet show, Punch and Judy. Sulzberger graduated from the Loomis Chaffee School and then enlisted into the United States Marine Corps during World War II, serving from 1944 to 1946, in the Pacific Theater. He earned a B.A. degree in English and history in 1951 at Columbia University. As a student, he roomed with composer Philip Springer in John Jay Hall. As a member of the Marine Forces Reserve he was recalled to active duty during the Korean War. Following completion of officer training, he saw duty in Korea and then in Washington, D.C., before being inactivated.

== Publisher of The New York Times ==
Sulzberger became publisher of The New York Times in 1963, after the death of his sister Marian's husband, Orvil Dryfoos, who had been publisher for less than two years. Sulzberger was 37 at the time, the youngest publisher in Times history. Prior to Dryfoos, Sulzberger's father, Arthur Hays Sulzberger, and maternal grandfather, Adolph Ochs, were the publishers, and also the chairs of the board of The New York Times Company.

In the 1960s Sulzberger built a large news-gathering staff at The Times. He was its publisher when the newspaper won a Pulitzer Prize in 1972 for publishing The Pentagon Papers. He was elected a fellow of the American Academy of Arts and Sciences in 1988. His son Arthur Ochs Sulzberger Jr. succeeded him as the newspaper's publisher in 1992. Sulzberger remained chairman of The New York Times Company until October 1997.

== Philanthropy ==
In addition to his work at The New York Times, he also served as trustee from 1968 as well as chairman of the Metropolitan Museum of Art from 1987 to 1998. He was elected as a life trustee of Columbia University in 1967.

== Personal life and death ==
Sulzberger was married three times. In 1948, he married Barbara Winslow Grant(of mostly Scottish and English heritage) in a civil ceremony at her parents' home in Purchase, New York. They had two children: Arthur Ochs Sulzberger Jr.; and Karen Alden Sulzberger (married to author Eric Lax); before divorcing in 1956.

In December 1956, he married Carol Fox Fuhrman; they had one daughter, Cynthia Fox Sulzberger Green, before his wife died in 1995. He also adopted Fox's daughter from a previous marriage, Cathy Sulzberger (who married Joseph George Perpich). In 1996, he married Allison Stacey Cowles, widow of William H. Cowles, 3rd (died 1992), who was part of the Cowles family that owns The Spokesman-Review of Spokane, Washington.

In 2005, the Newspaper Association of America (NAA) honored Sulzberger with the Katharine Graham Lifetime Achievement Award. Sulzberger dedicated the Wellesley College pub, aptly named "Punch's Alley", in honor of his wife, Allison, a class of 1955 Wellesley alum.

Sulzberger died at his home in Southampton, New York on September 29, 2012, at the age of 86.

=== Publication of the Pentagon Papers ===
On June 13, 1971, The New York Times published the first of seven articles on the Pentagon Papers. According to Floyd Abrams, Sulzberger "made the call to accept the risks rather than those of silence", adding that "In retrospect, the decision may seem obvious, but it was by no means an easy one at the time, and it remains one for which Sulzberger deserves enormous credit."

== Sources ==
- Behind the Times: Inside the New New York Times, by Edwin Diamond. Villard Books.
- The Trust: The Private and Powerful Family Behind The New York Times, by Alex S. Jones, Susan E. Tifft. Back Bay Books (2000), ISBN 0-316-83631-1.

Business positions
Preceded by Orvil Dryfoos	The New York Times Company Publisher; 1963–1992	Succeeded by Arthur Ochs Sulzberger Jr.
