= History of The New York Times (1998–present) =

Aspect of newspaper history

Following the establishment of their website, The New York Times retained its journalistic hesitancy from executive editor Joseph Lelyveld's refusal of publishing an article on the Clinton–Lewinsky scandal from Drudge Report. Editors conflicted with print editors on several occasions, including wrongfully naming security guard Richard Jewell as a suspect in the Centennial Olympic Park bombing and covering the death of Diana, Princess of Wales in greater detail than the print edition. The New York Times Electronic Media Company was adversely affected by the dot-com crash. The Times extensively covered the September 11 attacks. The following day's print issue contained sixty-six articles, which included the work of over three hundred dispatched reporters. Journalist Judith Miller was the recipient of a package containing a white powder during the 2001 anthrax attacks, furthering anxiety within The New York Times. In September 2002, Miller and military correspondent Michael R. Gordon wrote an article claiming Iraq had purchased aluminum tubes. The article was cited by then-president George W. Bush to claim that Iraq was constructing weapons of mass destruction; the theoretical use of aluminum tubes to produce nuclear material was subject of debate. In March 2003, the United States invaded Iraq, beginning the Iraq War.

An article in December 2005 disclosing warrantless surveillance by the National Security Agency contributed to further criticism from the George W. Bush administration and the Senate's refusal to renew the Patriot Act. In the Plame affair, a Central Intelligence Agency inquiry found that Miller had become aware of Valerie Plame's identity through then-vice president Dick Cheney's chief of staff Scooter Libby, resulting in Miller's resignation.

During the Great Recession, The New York Times suffered significant fiscal difficulties as a consequence of the 2007 subprime mortgage crisis and a decline in classified advertising. Exacerbated by Rupert Murdoch's revitalization of The Wall Street Journal through his acquisition of Dow Jones & Company, The New York Times Company started enacting measures to reduce the newsroom budget. The company was forced to borrow US$250 million (equivalent to $373,840,803.71 in 2025) from Mexican business oligarch Carlos Slim and fired over one hundred employees by 2010. nytimes.com's coverage of the Eliot Spitzer prostitution scandal, resulting in the resignation of then-New York governor Eliot Spitzer, furthered the legitimacy of the website as a journalistic medium. The Times's economic downturn renewed discussions of an online paywall; The New York Times implemented a paywall in March 2011. Abramson succeeded Keller, continuing her characteristic investigations into corporate and government malfeasance into the Times's coverage. Following conflicts with newly-appointed chief executive Mark Thompson's ambitions, Abramson was dismissed by Sulzberger Jr., who named Dean Baquet as her replacement.

Leading up to the 2016 presidential election, The New York Times elevated the Hillary Clinton email controversy and the Uranium One controversy; national security correspondent Michael S. Schmidt initially wrote an article in March 2015 stating that Hillary Clinton had used a private email server as secretary of state. Donald Trump's upset victory contributed to an increase in subscriptions to the Times. The New York Times experienced unprecedented indignation from Trump, who referred to publications such as the Times as "enemies of the people" at the Conservative Political Action Conference and tweeting his disdain for the newspaper and CNN. In October 2017, The New York Times published an article by journalists Jodi Kantor and Megan Twohey alleging that dozens of women had accused film producer and The Weinstein Company co-chairman Harvey Weinstein of sexual misconduct. The investigation resulted in Weinstein's resignation and conviction, precipitated the Weinstein effect, and served as a catalyst for the #MeToo movement. The New York Times Company vacated the public editor position and eliminated the copy desk in November. Sulzberger Jr. announced his resignation in December 2017, appointing his son, A. G. Sulzberger, as publisher.

Trump's relationship—equally diplomatic and negative—marked Sulzberger's tenure. In September 2018, The New York Times published "I Am Part of the Resistance Inside the Trump Administration", an anonymous essay by a self-described Trump administration official later revealed to be Department of Homeland Security chief of staff Miles Taylor. The animosity—which extended to nearly three hundred instances of Trump disparaging the Times by May 2019—culminated in Trump informing federal agencies to cancel their subscriptions to The New York Times and The Washington Post in October 2019. Trump's tax returns have been the subject of three separate investigations. During the COVID-19 pandemic, the Times began implementing data services and graphs. On May 23, 2020, The New York Times's front page solely featured U.S. Deaths Near 100,000, An Incalculable Loss, a subset of the 100,000 people in the United States who died of COVID-19, the first time that the Times's front page lacked images since they were introduced. Since 2020, The New York Times has focused on broader diversification, developing online games and producing television series. The New York Times Company acquired The Athletic in January 2022.

== 1998–2001: Clinton–Lewinsky scandal and conflicts with online editors ==
Executive editor Joseph Lelyveld remained defiant against what he perceived as journalistic irresponsibility, leading The New York Times with alternate articles in the days following the death of Diana, Princess of Wales. In January 1998, Drudge Report published an article alleging Bill Clinton was involved in a sexual relationship with White House intern Monica Lewinsky and Newsweek had held off on publishing investigative reporter Michael Isikoff's article on the affair. Though The Washington Post and the Los Angeles Times published articles on the Drudge Report's articles, the Times did not. In The Washington Post, Frankel expressed contempt for organizations that chose to cover the story. The New York Times devoted little attention to Clinton denying the allegations on 60 Minutes. Lelyveld's hesitation subsided when special counsel Ken Starr, appointed in the wake of the Whitewater controversy, began formally investigating the scandal and sent several subpoenas. Then-investigative reporter Jeff Gerth was the first to report on a meeting Clinton had with his personal secretary Betty Currie in which discussed the investigation. The Clinton–Lewinsky scandal tested Lelyveld's commitment to journalistic standards and he reluctantly published a story from national editor Dean Baquet about a semen-stained dress Lewinsky had kept. The New York Times published its first issue in color on October 16, 1997.

On September 14, 1998, the hacker group Hackers for Girlies allegedly gained superuser access to The New York Times's servers and displayed pornographic imagery on the website in retaliation for Mitnick's arrest, in what constituted as the first cyberattack against a major news organization. Times employees were made aware of the intrusion at 10:20 a.m. but did not resolve the issue until 7:30 p.m. New York Times Electronic Media Company president Martin Nisenholtz suspected the cyberattack may have been timed to follow the release of the Starr Report several days earlier. The Times garnered controversy over its coverage of the federal government's investigation into Wen Ho Lee, a nuclear scientist employed at Los Alamos National Laboratory. Lee, unnamed, allegedly gave classified nuclear documents to China. Over the next eighteen months, The New York Times published over three hundred pieces in relation with the investigation into Lee and China's access to government secrets. In December 1999, Lee was indicted by a federal grand jury and imprisoned without bail. The punitive conditions of his confinement were criticized and The New York Times drew ire from civil rights groups for failing to investigate the Federal Bureau of Investigation's dubious claims. In September 2000, the Times ran an editors' note acknowledging its errors.

Editors in the newsroom often clashed with online editors. In July 1996, The Atlanta Journal-Constitution wrongfully identified security guard Richard Jewell as the suspect in the Centennial Olympic Park bombing during that year's Summer Olympics. Department of Justice reporter David Johnston cautioned against naming Jewell after Federal Bureau of Investigation senior officials told him they did not believe the case against Jewell was strong. While the print edition of The New York Times did not accuse Jewell, nytimes.com editors named him within a headline. The death of Diana, Princess of Wales represented a dictonomy between editorial editor Bernard Gwertzman and Lelyveld; her death warranted dynamic updates on the website. Gwertzman's faster pace reporting was antithetical to the beliefs of editors who did not want their names attached to incomplete or unpolished articles. Meislin and Gwertzman relied upon wire stories from Reuters and the Associated Press to ensure the website was frequently updated, motivating reporters who would balk at events they could have covered. In August 1999, managing editor Bill Keller called political editor Jerry Gray to propose he staff a twenty-four hour newsroom for nytimes.com. Like Keller, Nisenholtz was a critic of the traditional news cycle implemented on nytimes.com, believing that websites such as Yahoo and CNN were "kicking [The New York Times's] ass".

By 1999, the New York Times Electronic Media Company was operating nytimes.com, boston.com, nytoday.com, golfdigest.com, and winetoday.com. The company was also responsible for maintaining The New York Times's digital archives, including negotiating with news retrieval services such as Dow Jones & Company and LexisNexis. The prospects of making the Electronic Media Company a standalone company became more apparent as companies such as The Walt Disney Company and Barnes & Noble began spinning off their digital divisions. The servers hosting nytimes.com could not sustain increases in web traffic; the website crashed during the 71st Academy Awards and the Martha's Vineyard plane crash that killed John F. Kennedy Jr. In May 1999, Times Company Digital—later named New York Times Digital in March 2000—was made its own separate division that reported to The New York Times Company's corporate office, not the newspaper division. The New York Times Company announced a US$100 million (equivalent to $186,956,521.74 in 2025) initial public offering of Times Company Digital with Goldman Sachs in January 2000. In October, the Nasdaq Composite crashed as part of the broader dot-com crash. New York Times Digital was forced to furlough over one hundred people and the company withdrew its initial public offering.

== 2001–2002: September 11 attacks ==
By December 2000, Lelyveld was preparing to retire. Lelyveld believed that Keller should replace him, though Sulzberger Jr. felt that The New York Times needed new management. Howell Raines was a self-described agent of change and appealed to Sulzberger Jr.'s progressiveness, though criticisms of his tenure appeared in Spy and circulated throughout the newsroom. Nonetheless, several notable editors supported Raines, including Max Frankel, Janet L. Robinson, and Baquet—a close friend of Lelyveld. Gerald M. Boyd stated that it "really wasn't a contest". Sulzberger Jr. inquired about Raines's management style after the criticisms surfaced to editorial editor Phil Taubman, to which Taubman assured him that Raines had become more gracious. Raines's appointment created a tumultuous transition of power. Lelyveld appointed Jill Abramson as Washington bureau chief and Nicholas Kristof as associated managing editor of the Sunday edition. Following the announcement, Lelyveld attempted to redesign the Times in his interregnum. The redesign was opposed by Raines, who called him a lame duck.

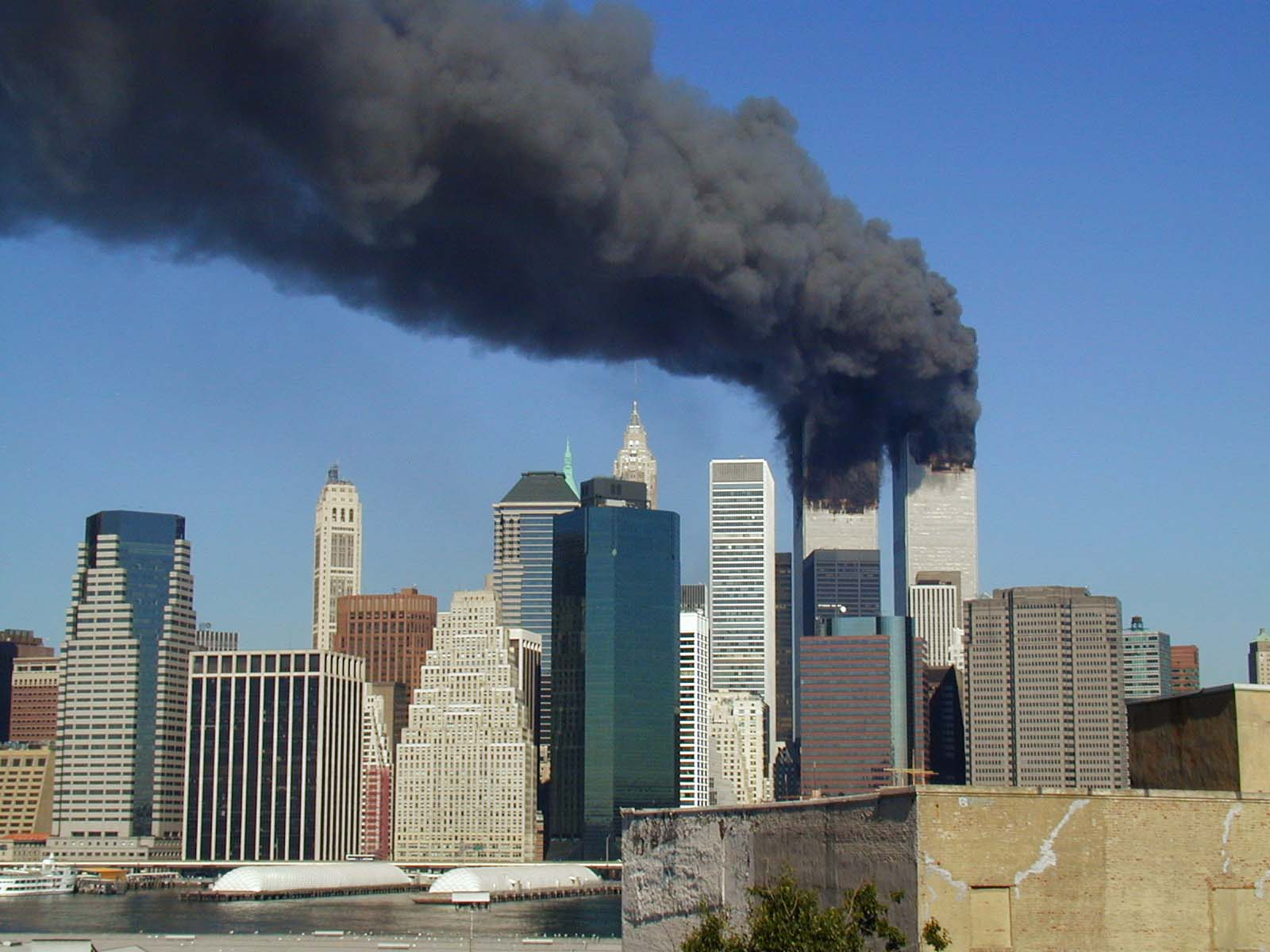
The New York Times extensively covered the September 11 attacks.

Raines became executive editor on September 5, 2001. On September 11, nineteen terrorists hijacked four passenger jets. The hijackers crashed two planes—American Airlines Flight 11 and United Airlines Flight 175—into the Twin Towers of the World Trade Center, collapsing the skyscrapers. A third plane, American Airlines Flight 77, crashed into The Pentagon, while a fourth plane, United Airlines Flight 93 was headed towards Washington, D.C. but crashed in rural Pennsylvania after a passenger revolt. That morning, most metropolitan editors with The New York Times had gone to vote in the New York City mayoral primaries and were told not to show up before noon; the election marked the end of New York City mayor Rudy Giuliani's term. Mass phone communications overloaded cell phone networks as reporters and readers attempted to call the Times about the attack, including eyewitness accounts. Anne Cronin, a features editor asked to fill-in for the early morning, was among the only employees in the building at the time. Deputy managing editor John M. Geddes gave Cronin his phone as he attempted to pull airline advertisements. Cronin directed six typists from the classified advertisements department to a conference room, instructing clerks to send eyewitness calls to the conference room and telling the typists to transcribe calls.

Sulzberger Jr. called Raines to report that the World Trade Center had gone up in flames. As Raines began to leave, Sulzberger Jr. called again to report that a second plane had hit the towers. When he arrived at the office, Cronin gave him an overview of the initial story assignments. Raines inspected each photograph from photographers with The New York Times and wire service photographers as they came in. The photos included The Falling Man, a photograph taken by Associated Press photographer Richard Drew depicting an unidentified man descending from the North Tower; Raines compared the photograph to Robert Capa's The Falling Soldier (1936). The issue of the Times the following day did not trim photographs between editions. It included a close-up in-color of the towers engulfed in flames beneath a large headline that read, "U.S. Attacked". Raines felt that the headline evoked the attack on Pearl Harbor and its design recalled "The Shuttle Explodes", a headline used for the Space Shuttle Challenger disaster. United Nations correspondent Serge Schmemann wrote the cover story for the print edition, while James Barron wrote for nytimes.com. A news alert was sent five minutes after the first plane hit. Robert D. McFadden, a journalist with whom The New York Times entrusted writing stories of significant importance to, attempted to get to the office from his rental home in East Hampton. McFadden arrived too late to write a story on the attacks, but assistant managing editor Susan Edgerley informed him that he would be doing lede-alls on the attacks going forward.

Dispatching over three hundred reporters, the following day's issue of The New York Times contained sixty-six articles on the attacks, and the editorial and Op-Ed page was devoted to the attacks. That morning, Raines ordered the Washington bureau to investigate the activities of the Federal Bureau of Investigation and the Central Intelligence Agency. Three weeks later, Bob Woodward of The Washington Post reported that FBI investigators found a leaflet containing Muslim prayers and last-minute instructions in the luggage of Mohamed Atta, the hijacker of American Airlines Flight 11 and the ringleader of the attacks. Raines, livid, chastised Abramson and reminded her of the Times's missteps during the Watergate scandal. The New York Times faced difficulty chronicling the loss of life. Four days after the attacks, metropolitan editor Christine Kay created a section titled "Portraits of Grief" (Note: The first issue was titled "Among the Missing".) using fliers from the New York University Medical Center. The section included short essays detailing the lives of victims of the attacks. The initiative earned praise from Al Hunt of The Wall Street Journal. By the end of the project, 2,400 people had been described.

Never have I, or many I work with, seen so much second-guessing and micromanaging.

— Glenn Kramon, September 2001

Anxiety and sorrow engulfed The New York Times in the months following the attacks, and a growing disdain for Raines mounted. A series of letters containing anthrax spores were mailed to the offices of several news organizations in the wake of the attacks. Several days after the first reported death, Judith Miller opened a package containing a white powder. The area was evacuated and the substance was determined to be harmless. Raines was displeased with Lelyveld's hastened appointment of Abramson and sought to remove her. Abramson told him that she had children in high school and did not want to leave the Washington, D.C. area. Raines favored Moscow bureau chief Patrick Tyler for Abramson's position and brought military correspondent Michael R. Gordon. Raines felt that Miller could make up for shortcomings he perceived existed in the Washington bureau and told Abramson to give her carte blanche. Boyd and Andrew Rosenthal's incessant requests to the bureau irked editors; John Broder, Abramson's deputy, referred to upper management as "the Taliban" in a call with Rosenthal. In one instance, Raines requested the bureau to write a story on the George W. Bush administration's restrictions on civil liberties following the attack. When Abramson informed Raines that the bureau had already written that story, Raines reprimanded her for speaking up against him.

== 2002–2003: Controversies over the Iraq War ==
In August 2002, Brent Scowcroft, the national security advisor under Gerald Ford and George H. W. Bush, opposed growing belligerence by Bush and vice president Dick Cheney over Iraq and Saddam Hussein in an opinion piece for The Wall Street Journal. Scowcroft argued that a war with Iraq was unwarranted, holding that the United States had no evidence to connect Hussein to the September 11 attacks, and that a war could spell greater doom for the region. Scowcroft's foreign policy experience gave greater weight to his pacifism; Republican figures such as then-House majority leader Dick Armey and then-senator Chuck Hagel previously advocated for Scowcroft's positions. Tyler and Department of State reporter Todd S. Purdum began writing an article on Scowcroft's comments, using an essay former secretary of state Henry Kissinger wrote in The Washington Post to satisfy Raines's ambition. The article attracted criticism from conservatives, who particularly directed their attention towards Raines; Raines's condemnation of former secretary of defense Robert McNamara did not escape critique. The Weekly Standard wrote that The New York Times had a publicly displayed bias and The Washington Post columnist Charles Krauthammer criticized the paper for "editorializing about a coming American war".

Iraq has made several attempts to buy high-strength aluminum tubes used to enrich uranium for a nuclear weapon.

— George W. Bush, September 11, 2002

That year, The New York Times published several articles advocating against an invasion of Iraq, citing the potential for an increase in the price of oil, a refugee crisis, and a perpetual war. Then-national security advisor Condoleezza Rice bemoaned the Times's coverage to White House reporter David E. Sanger. In late August, Cheney spoke at that year's Convention of Veterans of Foreign Wars using Kissinger's comments. After Raines rereviewed The Washington Post article, finding that the conclusion made by Tyler and Purdum was incorrect, two editors' notes were issued. On September 8, Gordon and Miller published a story claiming that senior officials allege that Iraq had purchased aluminum tubes. Cheney and Rice subsequently appeared on Sunday morning talk shows and referenced the story. Speaking to the United Nations General Assembly on September 11, Bush repeated claims of Iraqi aluminum tubes. The story represented an erroneous institutional failure—the theoretical use of aluminum tubes to produce nuclear material was subject of debate—and The New York Times's credibility was leveraged by Cheney and Rice to provide a casus belli for war. In March 2003, the United States officially invaded Iraq, beginning the Iraq War.

The New York Times began extensively criticizing the Augusta National Golf Club, the host of the annual Masters Tournament, in August 2002 for refusing to admit women, an endeavor that began with feminist Martha Burk. In November, the Times ran a story criticizing CBS for continuing to air the Masters Tournament. The continuous coverage attracted criticism from Slate's Mickey Kaus and Jack Shafer, and Glenn Kramon compared the Augusta story to a crusade. In December, the Daily News reported that The New York Times had pulled two sports columns written by Harvey Araton and Dave Anderson for disagreeing with the paper's position on Augusta; Araton had questioned if misogyny in sports should be condemned at a broader level, while Anderson had disagreed with an editorial calling on Tiger Woods to pull out from the Masters Tournament. Tensions had flared in the newsroom as a result of the Daily News's story. Boyd, who lead the newsroom while Raines negotiated the Times's acquisition of the International Herald Tribune, wrote a memo on the same day. Raines disagreed with Boyd's judgement and published the columns upon returning to the newsroom.

== 2003–2004: Jayson Blair and Raines's resignation ==
From 2002 to 2003, journalist Jayson Blair—regarded as prolific and with praise from Raines for his work—made several noted egregious errors and his behavior alarmed metropolitan editor Jonathan Landman. In October 2002, a series of coordinated shootings occurred in the Washington metropolitan area. Boyd assigned Blair to the story after The Baltimore Sun and The Washington Post routinely had exclusive stories The New York Times did not have. Blair reported that Maryland United States attorney Thomas M. DiBiagio halted an interview as suspect John Allen Muhammad was going to confess. The Washington Post publicly refuted the allegations and quoted DiBiagio. In February 2002, Landman sent Blair a negative evaluation for his substance abuse and consistent inebriation. In March, Landman sent a note to associate managing editor Bill Schmidt and head of recruiting Nancy Sharkey urging them to stop Blair from writing for the Times. Blair's editors prepared a list of steps for him to follow; Boyd blocked the enforcement of the list as probation, believing that it could open the paper up to a discrimination lawsuit.

On April 28, 2003, a reporter for The Washington Post called Blair to question him about apparent plagiarism in an article he had purportedly written from Los Fresnos, Texas. The article bore a resemblance to an article about Juanita Anguiano, a mother whose son Edward was the last soldier found missing in action in Iraq, written on April 18 by San Antonio Express-News reporter Macarena Hernandez, whom he had met years earlier at a minority recruitment program. National editor Jim Roberts called him the following day. Roberts inquired about Blair's recollection of the house he had visited. Blair accurately answered his questions using his access to The New York Times's computerized photo archive. Schmidt interviewed Blair the following morning and concluded that Blair's story was plagiarized after he stated that the car rental office at the airport was closed; a cursory check determined that it was open. The next morning, Blair resigned before Schmidt could fire him and stated he was considering suicide. The Times publicized the affair on May 2 with an editors' note.

The widespread fabrication and plagiarism represent a profound betrayal of trust and a low point in the 152-year history of the newspaper.

— The New York Times, May 11, 2003

The Blair scandal severely damaged The New York Times's reputation and credibility, and was an incident largely unparalleled in scope. Boyd began assembling several editors the morning the editors' note appeared. Boyd's secretary summoned several employees—legal correspondent Adam Liptak, business correspondent Jonathan Glater, beat reporter Jacques Steinberg, and editor Lorne Manly, who was promoted to permanent media editor that morning after serving in an acting position. Liptak, Glater, Steinberg, and Manly would investigate Blair's falsehoods as Times reporters, later joined by Kramon and investigative reporter Dan Barry. Kramon and Manly requested Raines and Boyd recuse themselves from the editing process of their report; Allan M. Siegal was hired to oversee their work. The team faced arduous working conditions, pressure to release a story, and rising tensions with Raines. Despite agreeing to not read the report until it was finished, Raines appeared on PBS NewsHour and stated that Blair had plagiarized thirty-six stories, a number produced by the team. The report was published in full on May 11. The examination dominated New York media amid a relatively quiet news cycle following the end of the invasion of Iraq. In an email the following day, Raines announced the formation of a Siegal-led commission to investigate Jayson Blair's mistruths and resolve issues from within the newsroom.

Criticism of Raines and Boyd mounted in the wake of the Blair scandal. Raines held a town hall meeting on May 14 at the Loews Astor Plaza. The meeting shifted its focus from Blair to Raines and Boyd; in a galvanizing moment, Landman's deputy editor Joe Sexton criticized Raines and questioned why Blair's sources were not questioned on the sniper attacks story, swearing at one point. Enraged, Raines fired back and chided him for swearing in a public venue. On the morning of June 4, Sulzberger Jr. announced Raines and Boyd's resignations. After Raines and Boyd had left the building, Sulzberger Jr. announced Lelyveld would serve as interim editor. Speculation over Lelyveld's replacement coalesced around Bill Keller, Dean Baquet, and The Boston Globe editor Martin Baron. Baquet, then managing editor of the Los Angeles Times, and Baron reassured their staff that they would not be leaving. Despite their previous work at The New York Times, Baquet and Keller were not presently employed at the publication and their appointment would be unprecedented. On July 14, Sulzberger Jr. announced Keller would be the next executive editor.

== 2004–2007: Judith Miller and further Iraq coverage ==
In April 2003, Judith Miller returned to Iraq to cover the country's weapons of mass destruction program. As a journalistic embed, Miller observed the Mobile Exploitation Team Alpha (MET Alpha) unit unsuccessfully search for weapons of mass destruction. Miller's reporting attracted ire from other reporters, editors, and executives. Baghdad bureau chief Patrick Tyler and his predecessor, John Fisher Burns, were chagrined over her reporting of Iraqi dissident Ahmed Chalabi; Miller had written an article Chalabi after being informed that the bureau intended to write its own article on him. Newsroom staff viewed her as untrustworthy and suspected that Miller was protected by Raines and Boyd despite producing stories discrediting The New York Times. In May, The Washington Post's Howard Kurtz surfaced an email from Miller to Burns admitting that her foremost source was Chalabi after circulating within the Washington bureau. Miller's behavior concerned Lelyveld in his tenure as acting executive editor. Keller informed Miller that she could no longer write about Iraq or weapons of mass destruction.

Despite Keller and Jill Abramson's intentions, criticism did not subside over The New York Times's coverage of Iraq. In February 2004, former Columbia Journalism Review executive editor Michael Massing published Now They Tell Us: The American Press and Iraq in The New York Review of Books, offering a scathing critique of the Times for failing to address Miller's reporting. Daniel Okrent, who was appointed public editor in December 2003, was receptive to Massing and other critics's grievances. Okrent told Keller that he would devote several weeks to review The New York Times's coverage. Concerned, Keller felt that the criticisms needed to be publicly addressed before Okrent published his findings. Over the course of three days, Abramson discovered several stories written by Miller that were not up to the Times's journalistic standards. In one article resurfaced by Abramson, Miller claimed that an unidentified scientist informed the team that Iraq had destroyed chemical weapons and biological warfare equipment days before the invasion began. The claim lacked independent confirmation and "should not have been published".

What we did not anticipate was the extent to which the explosives story would generate a firestorm of hostility towards The New York Times.

— Bill Keller, December 2004

In October 2004, days before the 2004 presidential election, The New York Times reported that 380 tons of high explosives had disappeared from Al Qa'qaa, an Iraqi weapons facility. The report was seized upon by Democratic candidate John Kerry against Bush. The White House and conservatives challenged the article's accuracy, claiming that the explosives were removed prior to the invasion. As the Times prepared to publish its article critical of the Bush administration, Keller initially decided against publishing an article disclosing warrantless surveillance by the National Security Agency following the September 11 attacks. Central Intelligence Agency correspondent James Risen and Department of Justice correspondent Eric Lichtblau attempted to persuade Keller, Abramson, and Washington bureau chief Phil Taubman. The conspicuous timing of the article and the government's urging that its publication would put national security at risk. In December 2005, the article appeared after Risen had threatened to include it in his forthcoming book State of War (2006). The article contributed to the Senate's refusal to renew the Patriot Act; New York senator Chuck Schumer said that the report "greatly influenced [his] vote". The White House and conservatives criticized The New York Times again, and left-wing media criticized the publication for indirectly assisting in Bush's successful reelection.

In February 2002, the Central Intelligence Agency dispatched former ambassador Joseph C. Wilson to Niger to investigate claims that Saddam Hussein had purchased yellowcake, a substance that could be used for uranium enrichment. Wilson questioned the factual basis of the war in various opinion pieces for The New York Times. In one such opinion piece in July 2003, Wilson held that justification for the invasion of Iraq relied upon fabricated and distorted evidence. A week after the opinion piece, columnist Robert Novak publicly disclosed that Wilson's then-wife Valerie Plame was a covert Central Intelligence Agency agent, a potential violation of the Intelligence Identities Protection Act. The Department of Justice opened an inquiry into Novak's actions as possible retaliation against Wilson and named Patrick Fitzgerald as special counsel in December 2003. Fitzgeneral subpoenaed Miller in June 2005, whom he suspected had received information about Wilson from Cheney's chief of staff Scooter Libby. Sulzberger Jr. and Keller fervently rallied the Times around Miller, but their position became untenable after an examination by three employees in October determined Miller spoke to Libby several times. Miller resigned on November 9.

Concerned of the advertising potential on the Internet, Sulzberger Jr. sought additional revenue sources for The New York Times. In September 2005, the Times imposed its first domestic paywall on nytimes.com with TimesSelect. The Wall Street Journal remained the only newspaper in the United States to implement a paywall by TimesSelect's introduction; the Los Angeles Times had attempted a paywall approach but abandoned it. The service provided readers with content from writers such as Maureen Dowd, Thomas Friedman, Bob Herbert, and one hundred free articles per month from The New York Times's archives. TimesSelect debuted at US$49.95 per year (equivalent to $82.34 in 2025), in comparison to the US$481 (equivalent to $792.92 in 2025) metropolitan readers paid per year for daily home delivery. TimesSelect was loathed by columnists who saw their readership decrease. Friedman noted that he had accrued international readers who were unwilling to pay, and he provided free access codes to TimesSelect. The service was discontinued two years later after nytimes.com had generated enough advertising revenue.

== 2007–2011: The New York Times Building and the Great Recession ==
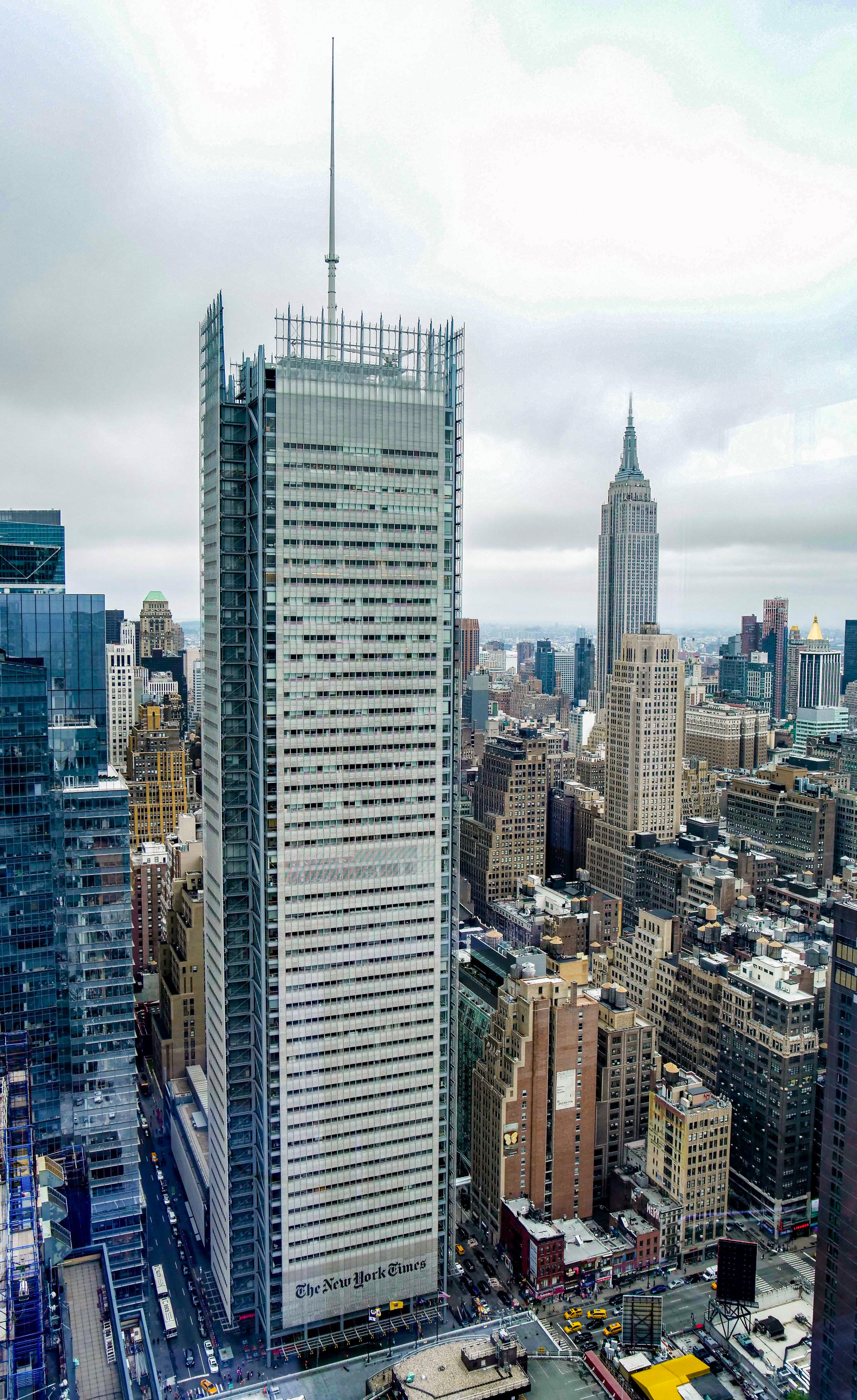
The New York Times Building, the headquarters of The New York Times since 2007.

By October 1999, The New York Times Company began considering a new headquarters on Eighth Avenue in an effort to adhere to technological demands and expansions. Revitalization efforts along 42nd Street, particularly following the construction and occupance of 4 Times Square by Condé Nast and other buildings—such as 3 Times Square for Reuters and 5 Times Square for Ernst & Young—created viability in the area for The New York Times to construct its headquarters there. The New York Times Company selected Forest City Ratner as the developer for its Eighth Avenue building in February 2000. Following several bids, Italian architect Renzo Piano's proposal was accepted in October. Fox & Fowle was selected as Piano's co-architect. The New York Times Building began construction in late 2004 and Times employees began occupying the building in June 2007. That month, The New York Times's printing operations moved to the new building. The building cost a projected US$1 billion (equivalent to $1,552,720,269.62 in 2025).

The newspaper industry exited a harrowing 2008 and entered 2009 in something perilously close to free fall.

— Pew Research Center, 2008

The Great Recession presented significant challenges to the newspaper industry, which had faced years of declining circulation and advertising. The scandals that had affected The New York Times decreased profits further; The New York Times Company earnings decreased from US$450 million (equivalent to $818,220,259.35 in 2025) in 2001 to US$292.5 million (equivalent to $498,579,545.45 in 2025) by the end of 2004. The recession ended several publications, forced other publications to end print circulation, and resulted in bureau closures and layoffs. Classified advertisements in real estate furthered their decline from websites such as Craigslist with the subprime mortgage crisis that preceded and concurred with the Great Recession. Company executives believed that the Times was sustained by loyal readership, though the Sulzberger's dynasty attracted criticism from investors, who noted the US$600 million (equivalent to $958,237,041.93 in 2025) loss from The Boston Globe's performance in 2006 and US$1.1 billion (equivalent to $1,707,992,296.58 in 2025) debt as a result of an ill-conceived share buyback.

The New York Times Company enacted a series of cost-cutting decisions as a result of the Great Depression and exacerbated by The Wall Street Journal, a newspaper reinvigorated by Rupert Murdoch following his acquisition of Dow Jones & Company in August 2007. Sulzberger Jr. sought to reduce the newsroom's budget by US$10 million (equivalent to $14,953,632.15 in 2025). In February 2008, dozens of employees were fired in what the Newspaper Guild described as the Saint Valentine's Day Massacre. Continued layoffs did not financially sustain The New York Times. In September, the Times ended its metropolitan section, followed by dividend reductions—a financial setback for the Sulzberger family, many of whom depended on the dividends and advertisements on the front page. The New York Times Company was forced to borrow US$250 million (equivalent to $373,840,803.71 in 2025) from Mexican billionaire Carlos Slim. The Atlantic writer Michael Hirschorn suggested that The New York Times could go out of business by May 2009. By December, the Times was worth US$1 billion (equivalent to $1,500,697,999.07 in 2025). The New York Times would cut over one hundred jobs over the next two years.

In March 2008, courts reporter William K. Rashbaum received a tip regarding a federal investigation into Emperors Club VIP, an international escort agency. An attempt to identify an unnamed client, purportedly a wealthy New York political figure, began out of fear that the Daily News or the New York Post would learn of the investigation. Several reporters cross-referenced the travel records of then-governor of New York Eliot Spitzer with the client. On March 10, upon returning from a jog, Spitzer noticed a reporter from The New York Times in the lobby of 985 Fifth Avenue, the apartment where he lived. Spitzer suspected that the reporter was there as part of the investigation and immediately rushed to the governor's office. Spitzer's departure expedited the article's publication online, a break from tradition; reports of significant importance were published online concurrently with printing presses. The prostitution scandal marked the legitimacy of nytimes.com for publishing news as the print form of the Times. Spitzer resigned a week later.

== 2011–2015: Online paywall and the Innovation Report ==
The New York Times's economic downturn had renewed discussions of an online paywall, and executives began analyzing online business models as an alternate source of revenue by January 2010. Sulzberger Jr. proposed a paywall that could be disabled in the event of a major story. By January 2011, Times employees were still working on the paywall system, spending US$40 million (equivalent to $57,248,520.71 in 2025) to US$50 million (equivalent to $71,560,650.89 in 2025) on the project. On March 28, 2011, (Note: The New York Times's online paywall was initially introduced in Canada on March 17, 2011.) The New York Times implemented a metered paywall across nytimes.com. Readers would be able to access twenty articles for free before being having to pay, a deviation from the absolute approach taken by The Wall Street Journal and the Financial Times, though readers could access links from incoming websites for free. The paywall debuted with three subscription services paid every four weeks, US$15 (equivalent to $21.47 in 2025) for access to nytimes.com and a mobile app, US$20 (equivalent to $28.62 in 2025) for access to nytimes.com and an iPad app, and US$35 (equivalent to $50.09 in 2025) for an all-access subscription. Over ten thousand readers initially signed up, and nearly four hundred thousand people had signed up by 2012. In March 2012, the number of free articles was reduced to ten.

On September 6, 2011, Keller retired. Sulzberger Jr. appointed Abramson as executive editor, the first female executive editor in The New York Times's history. Within weeks, Abramson had installed a new managing editor, two assistant managing editors, and several national desk editors. Abramson's characteristic investigations into corporate and government malfeasance carried into the Times's coverage—often including multimedia elements,—earning the publication four Pulitzer Prizes. In December 2012, The New York Times published "Snow Fall: The Avalanche at Tunnel Creek", a multimedia feature by John Branch regarding the Tunnel Creek avalanche earlier that year. "Snow Fall" was viewed by over three million people. By 2013, Abramson expressed doubts about her longevity as executive editor; newly-appointed chief executive Mark Thompson's ambitions conflicted with Abramson's and newsroom evaluations assessed her as difficult to work with. In April 2013, Politico published an article depicting Abramson as a struggling editor. On May 14, 2014, Sulzberger Jr. dismissed Abramson, naming Dean Baquet as her replacement, the first African-American executive editor.

The New York Times needs to accelerate its transition from a newspaper that also produces a rich and impression digital report to a digital publication that also produces a rich and impressive newspaper.

— The Innovation Report, March 24, 2014

During Abramson's tenure, The New York Times commissioned an internal report assessing the paper's transition into online platforms as nytimes.com traffic fell by half from the previous year. The eight-person Innovation Commission was overseen by Sulzberger Jr.'s son A. G. Sulzberger, who opposed Abramson's conventional ideas as editors left for position at online-focused publications such as BuzzFeed, The Guardian, and The Huffington Post. According to committee member Adam Bryant, systemic change was not the commission's goal. The Innovation Report was presented to a limited group of executives and editors on paper in March 2014. The committee argued that the Times as a business included data analysts and programmers, citing The Guardian's American editor Janine Gibson's work transitioning the paper online using social media platforms such as Twitter and Facebook. Sulzberger's committee found that editors were often unable to promote their work. The report included passages of discontent between Abramson and newsroom. Though it called for a reconsideration of the business-newsroom relationship heralded by Abramson, it included praises of her performance. Abramson read the Innovation Report as critical of her performance from the Sulzberger family. Abramson agreed to publish an abridged version of the report with a memorandum from her and Baquet endorsing its recommendations. One day after Abramson's dismissal, BuzzFeed writer Myles Tanzer obtained a full copy of the Innovation Report and subsequently published it. The report earned praise from the newspaper industry; Nieman Journalism Lab director Joshua Benton wrote that the Innovation Report was one of the "key documents of this media age" and admitted to having cried over its poignancy.

== 2015–2017: 2016 presidential election ==
The New York Times contributed to the elevation of the Hillary Clinton email controversy as a national story, believing that readers were "highly interested" in the controversy, and the publication was critical of Hillary Clinton as a whole. On March 2, 2015, national security correspondent Michael S. Schmidt reported that Clinton had used a private email server while conducting business as secretary of state. In April, the Times, The Washington Post, and Fox News obtained exclusive deals to pursue a storylines within Breitbart News contributor Peter Schweizer's book Clinton Cash. The New York Times subsequently published an article reporting that the Clinton Foundation received undisclosed payments from the founder of Uranium One chairman Ian Telfer as the Russian government assumed control of the company. The article and Clinton Cash became the basis for the Uranium One controversy. In July, Schmidt and Matt Apuzzo wrote an article claiming that the Department of Justice had opened a criminal investigation into Clinton; the Department of Justice had opened a security referral into Clinton's email practices instead.

The New York Times's editorial board endorsed Clinton for the presidency and offered a concurring opinion in opposition to Donald Trump for his "false and outrageous allegations" and "xenophobic nationalism". The Times temporarily removed its online paywall in the days leading up to the 2016 presidential election. The New York Times's coverage of the election was distinguished by data-driven visual journalism featuring live forecasts, an interactive map, and an online chat. The Times predicted that Clinton would win the presidency and prepared the headline "Madam President" in the hours before the election results were finalized. A defining feature of The New York Times's online coverage was "the needle", a thermometer dial showing the probability of Clinton or Trump winning. To represent the dial's margin of error, the needle of the dial fluctuated. The needle initially favored Clinton but shifted to Trump by 10:00 p.m. The Times reused the needle for the 2018 elections with a baseline at zero and a less prominent role. As Trump emerged victorious in Florida, journalists hastily rewrote stories and headlines. National political correspondent Alex Burns quickly rewrote a profile for Trump; by contrast, a profile for Clinton had been written days earlier.

In an upset victory, Trump was elected president. The New York Times ran the headline "Trump Triumphs". The Times became subject to criticism for its inaccurate prediction—attributed to neglected voter discontent in the Rust Belt—and Democrats associated Clinton's loss to the Times's coverage of the email controversy. The New York Times Company's executive committee gathered the following morning to discuss how a Trump presidency would affect the publication. Several days later, Trump tweeted that the Times was losing thousands of subscribers due to its "very poor and highly inaccurate coverage"; The New York Times added tens of thousands of subscriptions in the week following Election Day, its largest one-week rise since 2011. Then-editorial editor James Bennet proposed adding more conservative columnists to round out the Times's predominantly-liberal opinion writers. Months after the election, Bennet hired The Wall Street Journal editorial editors Bret Stephens and Bari Weiss. Stephens, in his debut column, questioned scientific consensus on climate change, and Weiss questioned whether Christine Blasey Ford's allegations of sexual assault against Brett Kavanaugh should affect his Supreme Court nomination, drawing indignation.

== 2017–2018: Donald Trump, sexual harassment investigations, and Sulzberger Jr.'s resignation ==
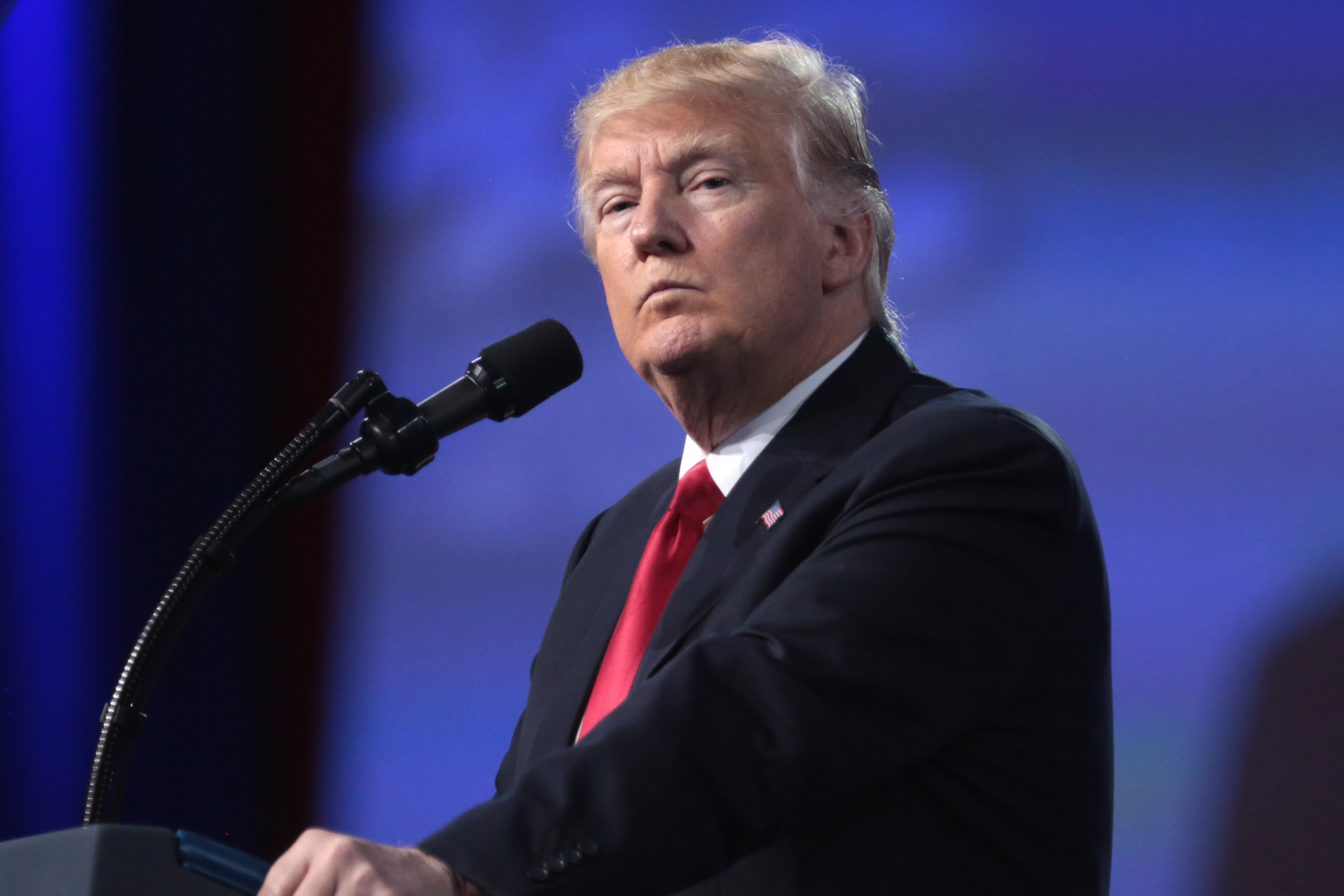
Former president Donald Trump issued ridicule against The New York Times at the 2017 Conservative Political Action Conference, referring to the publication as the "enemy of the people".

In February 2017, journalist Mark Mazzetti, Schmidt, and Apuzzo published an article claiming that individuals associated with the Trump campaign had contacts with Russian intelligence officials. At that year's Conservative Political Action Conference, Trump referred to publications such as The New York Times as "enemies of the people" and authored a tweet negatively criticizing the Times and CNN. Following his speech, then-White House press secretary Sean Spicer prohibited The New York Times and several other publications, including CNN, the Los Angeles Times, the BBC, and Politico from attending his press briefings. An article in March revealed that then-House Intelligence Committee chair Devin Nunes—who began an investigation into Russian interference in the 2016 elections—was provided with intelligence reports from two White House officials, contributing to his recusal the following month. On April 1, the Times published an article by Schmidt and business journalist Emily Steel alleging that Fox News host Bill O'Reilly engaged in sexual harassment; O'Reilly was released from the network on April 19.

On October 5, 2017, The New York Times published an article by journalists Jodi Kantor and Megan Twohey alleging that dozens of women had accused film producer and The Weinstein Company co-chairman Harvey Weinstein of sexual misconduct, allegations that had been rumored for decades prior. The article included a testimonial from actress Ashley Judd and states Weinstein paid eight settlements to victims, including actress Rose McGowan. The investigation created an imbroglio within The Weinstein Company; the company's board of directors proposed removing Weinstein. The New Yorker published a separate exposé into Weinstein on October 10 with additional details of forced oral and vaginal sex. The Times's investigation precipitated a broader range of allegations against hundreds of notable figures known as the Weinstein effect and was the catalyst for the #MeToo movement. In February 2018, The Weinstein Company filed for bankruptcy. Weinstein was indicted in May and convicted in February 2020; in March, he was sentenced to twenty-three years in prison.

The New York Times Company has focused on circulation figures for revenue after subscription-based revenue surpassed advertising in 2012, and acquired produce review website Wirecutter in October 2016 for US$30 million to integrate the website's reviews into The New York Times's lifestyle coverage. The company reported its largest increase in online subscribers in February 2017 amid criticisms from Trump and following the 2016 election, twice the growth in the third quarter. In an attempt to fundamentally alter the editing process, The New York Times Company offered copyeditors buyouts, effectively eliminating the standalone copy desk, and vacated the public editor position, By November 2017, the Times's revenue shifted towards online subscriptions and experienced exceptional performance amid a struggling media landscape; in December 2017, Carlos Slim reduced his investment in The New York Times. In October 2016, Sulzberger Jr. appointed his son, A. G. Sulzberger, as deputy publisher. On December 14, 2017, Sulzberger Jr. announced his resignation as publisher, appointing Sulzberger to the position.

== 2018–2020: Fourth Sulzberger era and the COVID-19 pandemic ==
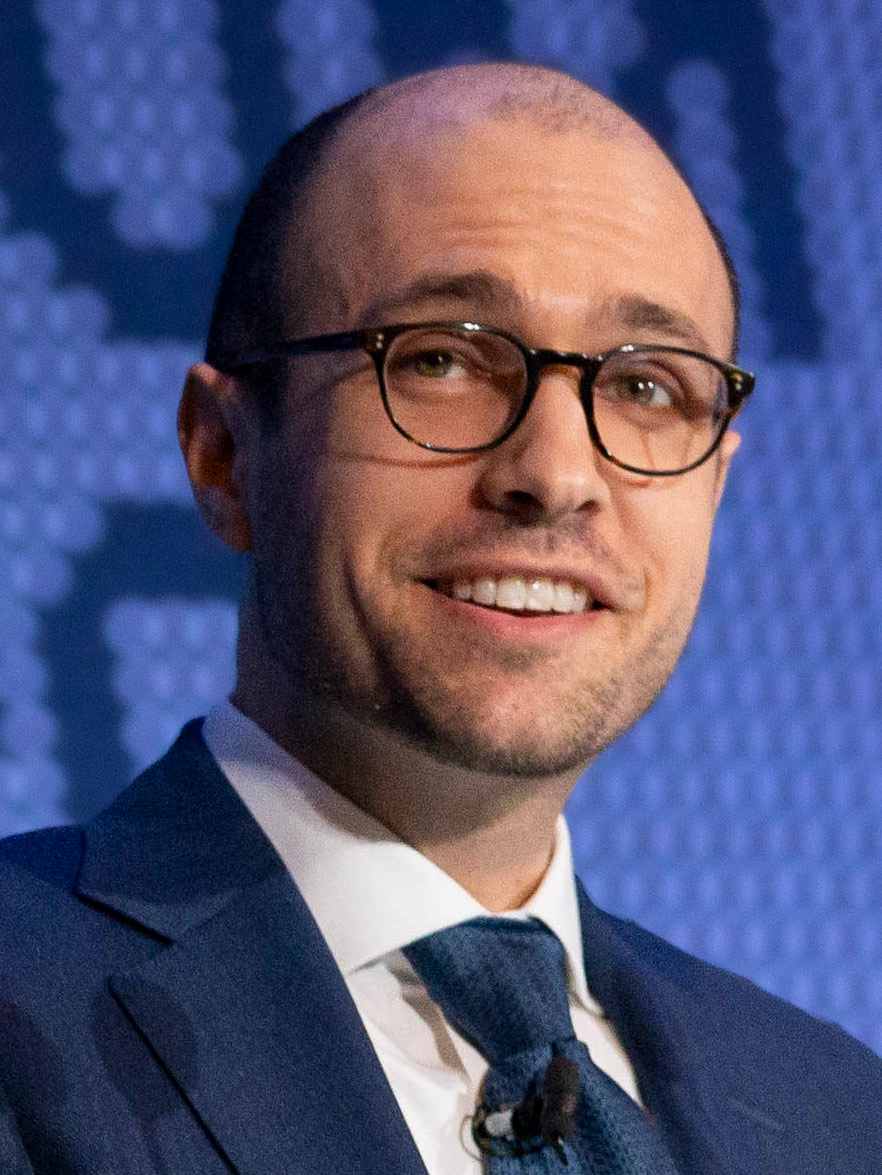
A. G. Sulzberger became publisher of The New York Times in 2018.

Sulzberger became publisher of The New York Times on January 1, 2018, following efforts from Sulzberger's cousins, Sam Dolnick and David Perpich, to succeed Sulzberger Jr. Trump's relationship—equally diplomatic and negative—marked Sulzberger's tenure; The New York Times found nearly three hundred public instances of Trump disparaging the Times by May 2019, including calling the paper an "enemy of the people" in four separate tweets. In July 2018, Sulzberger and Bennet attended an impromptu and off-the-record meeting with Trump and then-press secretary Sarah Huckabee Sanders at the White House. Trump violated the agreement of the meeting several days later by tweeting about it. In response, The New York Times issued a statement criticizing Trump's "deeply troubling anti-press rhetoric". In January 2019, Trump spoke with Sulzberger, joined by White House correspondents Peter Baker and Maggie Haberman. Sulzberger criticized Trump in an opinion piece for The Wall Street Journal several months later. In October, Trump instructed federal agencies to end subscriptions to the Times and The Washington Post.

On September 5, 2018, The New York Times published "I Am Part of the Resistance Inside the Trump Administration", an anonymous essay by a self-described Trump administration official later revealed to be Department of Homeland Security chief of staff Miles Taylor. In the opinion piece, Taylor provides several criticisms of Trump, including his relationship with Russian president Vladimir Putin, his threat to democracy and the "health of [the United States] republic", and his "erratic behavior". The article details discussions among Cabinet members of using the Twenty-fifth Amendment to remove Trump; Taylor reserves that "no one wanted to precipitate a constitutional crisis". According to multiple aides and allies, Trump was "volcanic" upon learning of the opinion piece and the contention of discontent within his Cabinet. Trump called for a Department of Justice investigation into the author and criticized The New York Times on Twitter. The anonymity of the essay resulted in speculation online as to the author's identity, including then-secretary of defense Jim Mattis, then-attorney general Jeff Sessions. In particular, the author's use of the word "lodestar" was noted for its potential connection to then-vice president Mike Pence. Taylor revealed that he had written the article days before the 2020 presidential election.

The New York Times has extensively investigated Trump's tax records since 2016. In September 2016, investigative journalist Susanne Craig anonymously received three of Trump's tax returns from 1995. The returns were published in an article on October 2, 2016. The documents show that Trump declared a US$916 million (equivalent to $1,935,422,581.35 in 2025) loss, a substantial deduction that could have eliminated the federal income taxes Trump owed for his role on The Apprentice or his salary as chairman and chief executive of Trump Hotels & Casino Resorts. Trump acknowledged that he used the loss to avoid paying federal income taxes during his second presidential debate with Clinton. Two years later, The New York Times published the results of its investigation into Trump's taxes, disproving his claims of self-made wealth and alleging that he committed tax schemes. The New York State Department of Taxation and Finance stated it would investigate the claims, though the article did not produce a significant audience. The New York Times published another report in September 2020, detailing Trump's tax returns through 2017 and 2018. The article was the subject of a lawsuit filed by Trump against his niece Mary and the Times in September 2021. The lawsuit was dismissed in May 2023 and Trump was ordered to pay nearly US$400,000 in legal fees in January 2023.

The COVID-19 pandemic fundamentally altered The New York Times's workplace, pushing The New York Times Company to implement remote work. The computer and technical assistance department sent over four hundred monitors to Times employees within weeks. The Times created an obituary series titled "Those We Lost" to profile a subset of COVID-19 deaths. From March 2020 to June 2021, obituaries for five hundred people were written by nearly one hundred journalists. The pandemic and the George Floyd protests led to uncertainty as to Baquet's successor, a discussion centralized around Bennet, Joseph Kahn, and Clifford J. Levy; in June 2022, Kahn was appointed executive editor. The increase in home cooking during the pandemic led to an increase in traffic to The New York Times's cooking website equivalent to traffic experienced during Thanksgiving the previous year, necessitating improvements to the website's infrastructure. The Times prominently integrated graphs into its front pages, expressing job losses with a bar chart extending into the right column. In one front page, a spike map of COVID-19 deaths extended into The New York Times's nameplate for the first time.

The New York Times has tracked COVID-19 cases in the United States since March 2020. Initial tracking, including the cluster of pneumonia in Hubei and cases in the United States in January and February, relied upon a Google Sheet. A significant increase in COVID-19 tested the Times's approach as the spreadsheet became cumbersome to edit and unresponsive. The federal government faced challenges in creating a reliable federal dataset, making COVID-19 case numbers a decentralized effort among states; available local data varied from PDFs to dashboards, and what constituted a case was ambiguous. The New York Times created a Node.js-based web application that could scrape information from several different sources in March 2020. The Times made its dataset publicly available on GitHub that month. By June, The New York Times was staffing six developers with scraping data and more than one hundred employees were involved in data collection efforts. In February 2021, the Centers for Disease Control and Prevention expanded its reporting to include county data and case numbers decreased due to vaccination efforts. As a result, The New York Times has winded down much of its efforts.

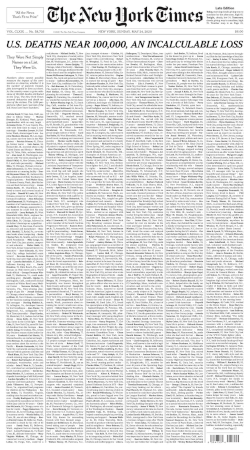
U.S. Deaths Near 100,000, An Incalculable Loss, the front-page article on May 24, 2020.

Since the onset of the COVID-19 pandemic, editors in the graphics department have created visuals to represent the death toll of COVID-19. On May 23, 2020, the front page of The New York Times solely featured U.S. Deaths Near 100,000, An Incalculable Loss, a subset of the 100,000 people in the United States who died of COVID-19 comprising the entire page. The project was the work of Simone Landon, an assistant graphics editor who sought to meaningfully express the lives lost. According to design director Tom Bodkin, it is the first time the front page of The New York Times lacked images since they were introduced. The Times has used various images and graphics to express COVID-19's death toll since then, including an image of Austin-based artist Shane Reilly's yard featuring one flag for every Texan who died from COVID-19 for 200,000 deaths in the United States. In February 2021, the front page of The New York Times contained a timeline graphic with one dot for every person who died of COVID-19 for 500,000 deaths due to COVID-19. A version of the graphic appeared online in January.

== 2020–2023: Tom Cotton's opinion piece, broader diversification and The Athletic ==
On June 3, 2020, The New York Times published "Send In the Troops", an opinion piece written by Arkansas senator Tom Cotton arguing for military action in response to the George Floyd protests. According to the National Review Online and a town hall following the piece, the idea of solely arguing for the invocation of the Insurrection Act of 1807 was suggested by the Times. The opinion piece drew outrage from employees and an open revolt ensued; (Note: Attributed to multiple references:) one thousand newsroom employees signed a letter against the piece as Sulzberger defended it on the basis of a "principle of openness to a range of opinions". Senate Minority Leader Mitch McConnell sardonically compared the opinion piece with others written by Russian president Vladimir Putin and then-Iranian foreign minister Mohammad Javad Zarif. An internal review found that a "rushed editorial process" had occurred and that Bennet had not read Cotton's opinion piece. The New York Times vowed to redevelop its opinion section. On June 7, Bennet resigned. Kathleen Kingsbury was named as his replacement. Bennet-appointee Bari Weiss resigned on July 14 after criticism mounted of her characterization of a meeting regarding "Send In the Troops".

The New York Times Company has acquired several companies and expanded to various ventures in an effort to diversify, a strategy devised by chief executive Meredith Kopit Levien. By July 2020, The New York Times had ten scripted television series and three feature documentaries in production. The Times' partnered with FX and Hulu to produce The New York Times Presents, a television documentary series, in July 2020; the series was nominated for a Primetime Emmy Award for Outstanding Documentary or Nonfiction Special for Framing Britney Spears. In June 2021, The New York Times published Day of Rage: How Trump Supporters Took the U.S. Capitol, a video investigation reconstructing the events of the January 6 United States Capitol attack. Day of Rage involved an estimated fifteen to twenty journalists and was shortlisted for the Academy Award for Best Documentary Short Film. The New York Times Company acquired Serial Productions, the production company behind Serial, in July 2020, after acquiring journalism audio service Audm in March.

In January 2022, The New York Times Company acquired The Athletic, a sports journalism website founded in 2016, for US$550 million, in an effort to gain more subscribers. The acquisition is the second-largest in the company's history. David Perpich became publisher of The Athletic. As publisher, Perpich integrated The Athletic into The New York Times's All Access bundle with The New York Times Cooking, The New York Times Games, and Wirecutter. The acquisition of The Athletic marked a shift in the Times's reporting of sports as the sports department focused on less traditional sports coverage; in 2015, The New York Times put New York Knicks writer Scott Cacciola on a sabbatical from Knicks coverage after the team had a beleaguered season. In July 2023, the Times disbanded its sports department, relying on coverage from The Athletic. The move was condemned by the New York Times Guild as a union busting attempt; The Athletic is not part of a union.

== 2023–present: Artificial intelligence and the Gaza war ==
The New York Times has opposed the use of artificial intelligence by employees, an effort led in the Times's corporate office by chief product officer Alex Hardiman and editorially by deputy managing editor Sam Dolnick and other senior editors, according to Vanity Fair. A memo written by director of photography Meaghan Looram and deputy managing editors Dolnick and Steve Duenes explicitly disallowed employee use of generative artificial tools. The New York Times has dedicated at least sixty employees to artificial intelligence working groups; during The New York Times Company's annual hackathon in July 2023, employees suggested artificial intelligence to develop chatbots for the Times's cooking website and a gift suggesting system for Wirecutter. In August, Semafor reported that The New York Times would not join a media organization coalition led by IAC Inc., formed to negotiate content rights with technology companies. That month, the Times updated its terms of service to disallow content scraping and blocked OpenAI's web crawler through robots.txt. NPR reported that The New York Times Company was considering legal action against OpenAI that could force the company to eliminate ChatGPT's dataset, according to Ars Technica. In December, The New York Times hired Quartz co-founder Zach Seward to lead artificial intelligence efforts.

In December 2023, The New York Times Company sued OpenAI and Microsoft in the District Court for the Southern District of New York, retaining law firm Susman Godfrey and Rothwell, Figg, Ernst and Manbeck. OpenAI attempted to reach a content licensing deal in April, but failed to reach a conclusion. According to the lawsuit, The New York Times began negotiations with OpenAI and Microsoft in April; such efforts did not produce any outcomes. The Times alleges that Browse with Bing, a feature that allows ChatGPT to access the internet, produced material significantly similar to Wirecutter's content, but did not attribute its content to Wirecutter and removed referral links to other websites. The lawsuit argues against the fair use arguments posed by technology companies because artificial intelligence tools are able to reproduce copyrighted content. Additionally, the lawsuit cites several instances of artificial intelligence confabulations in ChatGPT incorrectly attributed erroneous information to The New York Times. The Times requested for the defendants to be responsible for billions of dollars in damages and for the companies to delete training data and chatbot models containing copyrighted content from The New York Times. In a public statement in January 2024, OpenAI claimed that the Times had manipulated the results of its assessments. In February, Axios reported that The New York Times was developing an advertisement platform using generative artificial intelligence to recommend article targets for advertisers. The Times used artificial intelligence to generate auditory narration of its articles.

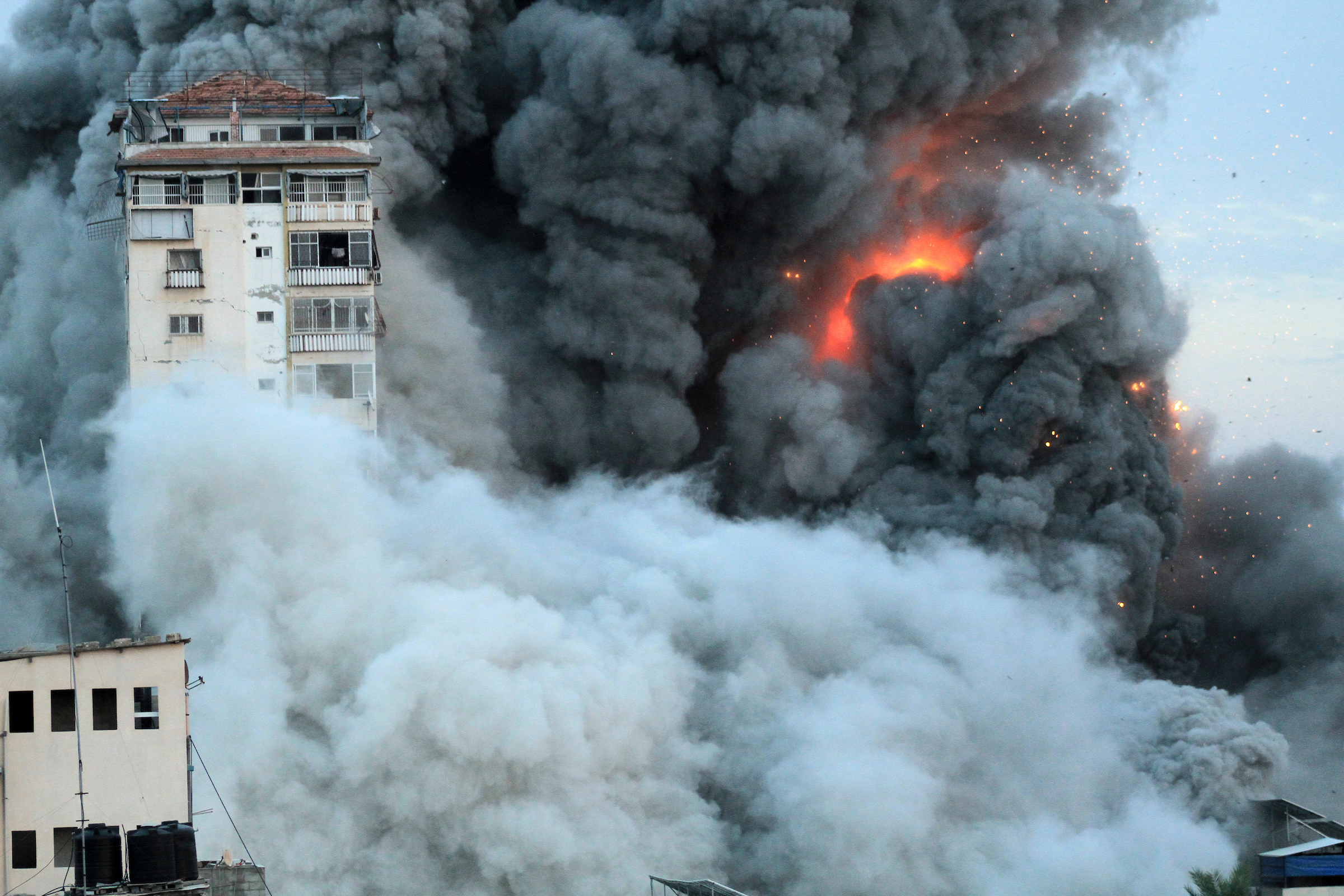
The residential buildings “Palestine Towers” destroyed by Israeli air strikes in Gaza on October 7, 2023. The Gaza war presented an upheaval within The New York Times.

The Gaza war presented an upheaval within The New York Times. In October 2023, the Times published a headline and issued a notification claiming that Israel was responsible for the Al-Ahli Arab Hospital explosion, attributing the explosion to claims by Hamas. The Times issued an editors' note several days later; president Joe Biden reportedly privately expressed that the headline could have escalated the war. In December, The New York Times published an investigation titled "'Screams Without Words': How Hamas Weaponized Sexual Violence on Oct. 7", alleging that Hamas weaponized sexual and gender-based violence during its armed incursion on Israel. The investigation was the subject of an article from The Intercept questioning the journalistic acumen of Anat Schwartz, a filmmaker involved in the inquiry who had no prior reporting experience and agreed with a post stating Israel should "violate any norm, on the way to victory", doubting the veracity of the opening claim that Gal Abdush was raped in a timespan disputed by her family, and alleging that the Times was pressured by the Committee for Accuracy in Middle East Reporting in America. The New York Times initiated an inquiry that received criticism from NewsGuild of New York president Susan DeCarava for purported racial targeting; the Times's investigation concluded in ambiguity, but found that journalistic material was handled improperly. The investigation was criticized in a letter by fifty professors; The New York Times stated that "Screams without Words" met the paper's editorial standards.

On January 31, 2025, a Defense Department memo announced that The New York Times must move out of its longtime workspace on the Correspondents' Corridor in the Pentagon, a move under a new Annual Media Rotation Program for the Pentagon Press Corps.
