= A Fragile Trust =

2013 film directed by Samantha Grant

- Film poster
- Directed by: Samantha Grant
- Written by: Samantha Grant; Richard Levien
- Produced by: Samantha Grant; Brittney Shepherd
- Cinematography: Singeli Agnew; Samantha Grant
- Edited by: Richard Levien
- Music by: Justin Melland
- Production company: Gush Productions
- Distributed by: Bullfrog Films
- Release date: June 15, 2013 (Sheffield Doc Fest)

A Fragile Trust: Plagiarism, Power, and Jayson Blair at The New York Times is a 2013 documentary film by director/producer Samantha Grant about Jayson Blair, a former journalist at The New York Times who was discovered copying the work of other reporters in 2003. The film explores Blair's rise as a promising young journalist and his decline into a spiral of lies, drugs, and mental illness. The documentary also explores how Blair's deception was handled by The Times' editorial staff and how many other media outlets covered the scandal as an issue of race, asserting that Blair's plagiarism was overlooked by superiors because he is African American.

A Fragile Trust had its film festival debut in June 2013 at the Sheffield Doc/Fest in Sheffield, England. It premiered in the United States on April 11, 2014, and screened at cities and universities across the U.S. and internationally. The film had its national theatrical release on April 11, 2014, and its national PBS broadcast premiere on May 5, 2014, as part of the Independent Lens documentary series. A companion Web-browser-based video game entitled Decisions on Deadline was released alongside the film designed to simulate the ethical choices journalists must make.

== Synopsis ==
The film features a series of exclusive interviews including discussions with Blair and former executive editor Howell Raines, who stepped down after Blair's plagiarism was uncovered and staff at The Times complained that the breach should have been handled sooner. Raines took the mantle of executive editor in September, 2001, just days before the 9/11 terrorist attacks on The World Trade Center and The Pentagon, leading the paper to "an unprecedented seven Pulitzer prizes." Despite the paper's success under Raines, many reporters expressed feelings of being under pressure and bullied by his demanding management style. Discontent reached an apex after Blair's resignation when a 14,000-word expose of the journalist's plagiarism was published in the Sunday edition of The Times and staff discovered that the paper's metro editor, Jonathan Landman, sent Raines an unheeded memo urging him "to stop Jayson from writing for The Times. Right now."

Blair, who was accused of plagiarizing in at least 36 of his articles, says in the film that even he is unsure how things got so out of control. In addition to dealing with drug and alcohol abuse and mental illness, he was also savvy with the Internet, a skill he says many of his editors did not possess at the time. This allowed to him copy and modify text from a variety of articles without lifting entire stories. Eventually, editors realized that Blair had plagiarized large sections of copy written by Macarena Hernandez in an article for the San Antonio Express-News about an American soldier who had gone missing in Iraq. Afterward, some of Blair's colleagues were tasked with the secret assignment of combing through all 73 pieces he wrote for The Times. This investigation led to the discovery that Blair often stayed at his apartment in New York when claiming to cover stories like the one Hernández wrote in Texas and the Beltway sniper attacks in Washington, D.C. When his deception was revealed, Blair said he considered suicide and resigned from The New York Times. Following a town hall meeting with Times employees, Raines stepped down alongside managing editor Gerald M. Boyd.

== Reception ==
A Fragile Trust won the Best Documentary Award at the 2014 Macon Film Festival and the Alliance of Women Film Journalists EDA Award from the 2014 Salem Film Fest. It was nominated for the Special Jury Award and the EDA Award at the 2013 Sheffield Doc/Fest, for Best Documentary at the Hawaii International Film Festival, the Metropolis Award at the 2013 DOC NYC, for Best Documentary at the 2013 Big Sky Documentary Film Festival, for Best Documentary at the 2014 Fargo Film Festival, and Best Documentary at the 2014 Cleveland Film Festival. It was also selected for the Hot Docs DocSoup screening series.

The film has a 56/100 based on a normalized rating of nine reviews on Metacritic. The New York Times' review said that "[l]ightness of touch is missing from the film, which features animated graphics and an ominous score," while Variety called it a "meticulous postmortem," and David Cuillier, director and associate professor of the University of Arizona School of Journalism and the immediate past president of the school's Society of Professional Journalists chapter, said it "should be required viewing for all journalism students, and interesting discussion fodder for pros."

== Cast ==
- Jayson Blair
- Howell Raines
- Macarena Hernandez
- Seth Mnookin
- Lena Williams
- Howard Kurtz
