= Hard News (book) =

2004 book by Seth Mnookin

Hard News: The Scandals at The New York Times and Their Meaning for American Media
- Author: Seth Mnookin
- Language: English
- Genre: Non-fiction
- Publisher: Random House
- Publication date: 2004
- Publication place: United States
- ISBN: 9780812972511

Hard News: The Scandals at The New York Times and Their Meaning for American Media is a 2004 book by journalist Seth Mnookin about the reign of Howell Raines at The New York Times. It addresses the Jayson Blair scandal.

Mnookin's thesis is that The New York Times remains the newspaper at the center of America's self-knowledge, and understanding of the rest of the world, and that accordingly 2003, a year of scandals at that paper that forced the resignation of Raines as executive editor, did important damage.

The fracturing of news coverage, all the cable and satellite stations and weblogs, have done nothing to diminish the importance of this particular institution, Mnookin writes. To the contrary, "the number of media options is so overwhelming that there almost needs to be a default standard-bearer....Every morning, the Times front page comes closer than any other single source of information to determining what will count as major news for the next twenty-four hours."
