= Gerald Boyd =

Gerald Boyd may refer to:

- Gerald M. Boyd (1950–2006), American journalist
- Gerald Boyd (British Army officer) (1877–1930)
