= Jill Abramson =

Former executive editor of The New York Times (born 1954)

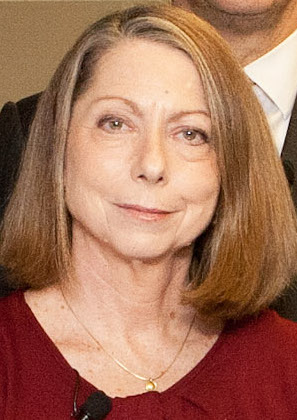
- Abramson in 2012
- Born: Jill Ellen Abramson; March 19, 1954 (age 72); New York City, U.S.
- Education: Radcliffe College (BA)
- Occupations: Journalist; editor; author; academic
- Years active: 1973–present
- Notable credit(s): The New York Times (1997–2014); The Wall Street Journal (1988–1997); The American Lawyer (1977–1986); Time (1973–1976)
- Spouse: Henry Little Griggs III (m. 1981)
- Children: 2

Executive editor of The New York Times
- In office September 2011 – May 2014
- Preceded by: Bill Keller
- Succeeded by: Dean Baquet

Jill Ellen Abramson (born March 19, 1954) is an American author, journalist, and academic. She is best known as the former executive editor of The New York Times; Abramson held that position from September 2011 to May 2014. She was the first female executive editor in the paper's 160-year history. Abramson joined the New York Times in 1997, working as the Washington bureau chief and managing editor before being named as executive editor. She previously worked for The Wall Street Journal as an investigative reporter and a deputy bureau chief.

In March 2016, she was hired as a political columnist for Guardian US. In 2019, she received widespread criticism after her book Merchants Of Truth was found to contain plagiarized passages and numerous factual errors, though Abramson's book was praised for its truthfulness by Donald Trump.

In 2012, she was ranked number five on the Forbes list of most powerful women. She was also named as one of the 500 most powerful people in the world by Foreign Policy.

== Early life and education ==
Abramson was born in New York City and grew up in a Jewish home. Her sister, Jane O'Connor, is the author of the Fancy Nancy book series. She received her high school diploma from Ethical Culture Fieldston School and a BA in History and Literature from Radcliffe College at Harvard University in 1976.

== Career ==
While a Harvard undergraduate, she was the arts editor of The Harvard Independent, and worked at Time magazine from 1973 to 1976. Subsequently, she spent nearly a decade as a senior staff reporter for The American Lawyer. In 1986, she was appointed as editor in chief of Legal Times in Washington, D.C., serving for two years. From 1988 to 1997, she was a senior reporter in the Washington bureau of The Wall Street Journal, eventually rising to deputy bureau chief. She joined The New York Times in 1997, becoming its Washington bureau chief in December 2000.

Abramson was the Times' Washington Bureau chief during the turbulent period of Spring 2003 during the run-up to the war in Iraq and the Jayson Blair scandal, which led to the resignation of Executive Editor Howell Raines and Managing Editor Gerald Boyd. In a February 2013 interview, Abramson spoke of the conflict she had with Raines as D.C. bureau chief, saying, "Howell from the get-go just had no use for me. ... I did think about quitting." Abramson was named to the news managing editor position (with co-Managing Editor John M. Geddes) by Raines' successor Bill Keller.

In 1995, Abramson and her Wall Street Journal colleague (and fellow Fieldston alumna) Jane Mayer co-authored Strange Justice: The Selling of Clarence Thomas, which detailed circumstances surrounding the confirmation hearings of Justice Clarence Thomas. Maureen Dowd would later write of having bonded with Abramson during that time. From 2000 to 2001, she was a professor at Princeton University. She was elected a Fellow of the American Academy of Arts and Sciences in 2001.

In February 2007, Abramson testified in the perjury trial of Scooter Libby, United States v. Libby. She was called as a defense witness to undercut the credibility of Judith Miller.

In 2010, Abramson worked on news content on the Times' website for six months.

On June 2, 2011, Abramson became the executive editor of the Times, replacing Bill Keller who stepped down from the position to become a full-time writer.

Abramson was scheduled to address the commencement exercises of Barnard College on May 14, 2012. Her speech was canceled after President Barack Obama requested to speak instead. She received an honorary degree at Fairleigh Dickinson's 69th Commencement Ceremony in May 2012.

In April 2013, Abramson was the subject of a sharply critical profile in Politico written by Dylan Byers entitled "Turbulence at the Times," in which anonymous Times staffers called her "impossible" and "very, very unpopular." Abramson was deeply distressed by the report, later saying it made her cry.

On May 14, 2014, Abramson was fired from her position as executive editor of the Times, and Dean Baquet succeeded her in that role. Abramson was reportedly fired because of "her arbitrary decision-making, a failure to consult and bring colleagues with her, inadequate communication, and mistreatment of colleagues". Five days later, she delivered the commencement address at Wake Forest University. In June 2014, it was announced that Abramson had joined the English department at Harvard, and would teach classes on writing narrative nonfiction.

During the run-up to the 2016 U.S. presidential election, Abramson argued in a column for Guardian US that Hillary Clinton, whom she had covered as a reporter and editor since the Whitewater controversy, was "fundamentally honest and trustworthy."

On February 19, 2018, Abramson followed up her 1995 book on Clarence Thomas and the Anita Hill hearings with a discussion concerning new evidence that Thomas had committed perjury which might be tied to possible impeachment. Abramson indicated that her reporting was initiated by an article by the journalist Marcia Coyle from 2016 when Abramson stated, "Tipped to the post by a Maryland legal source who knew Smith (who made the allegations), Marcia Coyle, a highly regarded and scrupulously nonideological Supreme Court reporter for The National Law Journal, wrote a detailed story about (Moira) Smith's allegation of butt-squeezing, which included corroboration from Smith's roommates at the time of the dinner and from her former husband. Coyle's story, which Thomas denied, was published October 27, 2016".

External videos
- After Words interview with Abramson on Merchants of Truth, February 16, 2019, C-SPAN

In December 2018, Fox News reported that Abramson's book Merchants of Truth criticized her former employer the Times for abandoning objectivity and becoming "anti-Trump" to bolster profits. Abramson responded by stating that the Fox News review "distorts and takes what I wrote totally out of context" and praised the Times along with The Washington Post for their "superb coverage of the corruption enveloping the Trump administration, the best investigative reporting I've seen."

== Plagiarism accusations ==
In February 2019, Vice News correspondent Michael C. Moynihan said Abramson's book Merchants of Truth contained several instances of plagiarism, posting a series of tweets comparing passages of the book to passages of other publications, including Time Out, The Ryerson Review of Journalism, The New Yorker, The Columbia Journalism Review, and other works. In a February 7 interview on Fox News, Abramson said she had no comment on the plagiarism accusations, but later that evening said she would review the passages in question. However, in an interview with NPR's Michel Martin, Abramson admitted that she "fell short" in attributing her sources for some passages of the book. In an interview with CNN's Brian Stelter, Abramson said that most of the plagiarized text was cited in footnotes, but that was she was sorry that a few pieces of text were not. Stelter pointed out to Abramson that lifting words from other sources and citing footnotes is still considered plagiarism.

== Personal life ==
In 1981, Abramson married Harvard classmate Henry Little Griggs III. Griggs was then president of Triad, a political public relations company. He is self-described as a "writer, editor and media-relations consultant specializing in nonprofit advocacy campaigns." They have two children.

In May 2007, Abramson was seriously injured in a truck-pedestrian crash near The New York Times's headquarters in Times Square. She subsequently filed a lawsuit against the truck's driver, owner, and operator, who was involved in the crash, as well as two companies involved in the crash.

In August 2010, Abramson was seriously injured while hiking in Yellowstone National Park. Suffering a broken arm and back injuries, she was airlifted to Billings, Montana for corrective surgery, which resulted in a full recovery.

Abramson has four tattoos on her body that she describes as "telling the story of me." They include a New York City Subway token; the letter "H," representing her alma mater, Harvard University, and her husband, Henry; and the letter "T" in the Gothic font of the New York Times logo. Abramson first unveiled her New York Times tattoo on a New York interview show less than a month before being fired from the paper, saying that it, along with the 'H' tattoo represent "the two institutions that I revere, that have shaped me." She has called her Times tattoo, which is emblazoned on her back, her "personal hieroglyphic." However, although she worked at The Wall Street Journal for 10 years, she elected to not be similarly marked by that newspaper because "It just wasn't in my family's blood."

== Bibliography ==
- Where They Are Now: The Story of the Women of Harvard Law 1974. New York: Doubleday, 1986. ISBN 978-0-385-19432-7, OCLC 12314642
- With Jane Mayer: Strange Justice: The Selling of Clarence Thomas. New York: Houghton Mifflin, 1994. ISBN 978-0-395-63318-2
- With Bill Keller: Obama: The Historic Journey. Callaway-New York Times 2009, ISBN 978-1594488931.
- The Puppy Diaries : Raising a Dog Named Scout. New York: Times Books. 2011. ISBN 978-0-805-09342-1.
- Merchants of Truth: The Business of News and the Fight for Facts. New York: Simon & Schuster, 2019. ISBN 9781501123207
