= Seth Mnookin =

American author and journalist

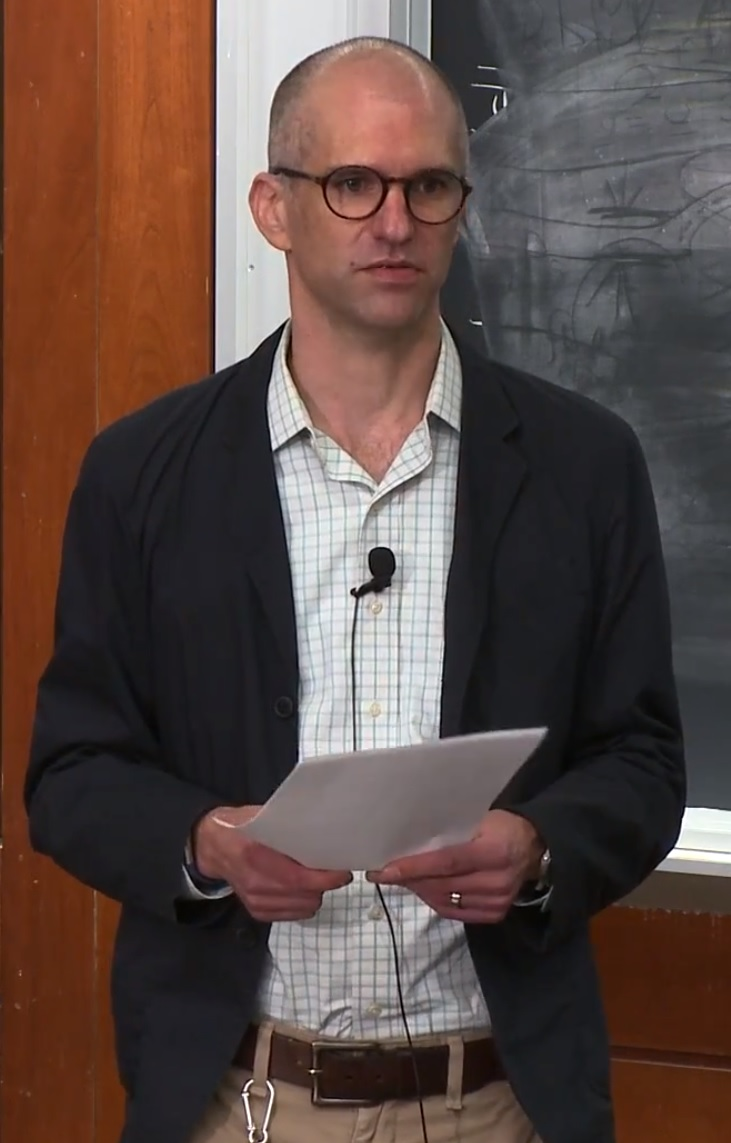
- Mnookin in 2018
- Born: Newton, Massachusetts, U.S.
- Education: Harvard University
- Occupations: Author; journalist
- Notable work: Hard News (2004)
- Website: sethmnookin.com

Seth Mnookin is an American non-fiction author and journalist.

As of 2025, he is a science writing professor at MIT, where he is also the Chair of Comparative Media Studies/Writing department and the Director of Institute's Graduate Program in Science Writing. He was a 2019 Guggenheim Fellow and is a former contributing editor at Vanity Fair.

== Early life and education ==
Mnookin grew up in a Jewish household in Newton, Massachusetts, and is a graduate of Newton North High School. He graduated from Harvard University with a degree in history and science in 1994 and was named a Joan Shorenstein Fellow at Harvard Kennedy School in 2004.

== Books ==
Mnookin is the author of three non-fiction books.

=== Hard News ===
His first book, Hard News: The Scandals at the New York Times and Their Meaning for American Media (Random House, 2004) grew out of reporting he did as a senior writer at Newsweek in 2002 and 2003. It uses the Jayson Blair plagiarism and fabrication scandal to conduct a broader examination of the troubles during the Howell Raines administration at the New York Times. It was named a Washington Post "Best Of" book for 2004 and was listed as one of the London Independent's list of the Top 50 books ever written on the media. It received overwhelmingly positive reviews from New York magazine ("richly dramatic, hugely entertaining"), Entertainment Weekly ("vigorous, purposeful prose and a killer knack for building suspense"), the Los Angeles Times ("two terrific books in one: a riveting thriller...and a Shakespearean tragedy"), and the Washington Post ("hard to put down...reads like a thriller"), among other places, and the book prompted Hunter S. Thompson to say Mnookin was "one of the best and brightest journalists of this ominous, post-American century." A negative review was published by the New York Times itself, which called the book "tedious" and said it "elevates trivial details to novelistic significance."

=== Feeding the Monster ===
In the fall of 2004, Vanity Fair assigned Mnookin a story on the Boston Red Sox. He began covering the team right before they won the 2004 World Series, and ended up spending more than a year living with the team and was given a key to Fenway Park His book, "Feeding the Monster: How Money, Smarts and Nerve Took a Team to the Top" (Simon & Schuster), chronicled the history of the team from 2001 to 2006, the first half-decade of the John W. Henry-Tom Werner ownership, and includes details about Theo Epstein's abbreviated departure from the team in late 2005. It was published in the summer of 2006, and it entered the New York Times Hardcover Bestseller List for Nonfiction at number 8. After Epstein left the Red Sox for the Chicago Cubs, he made an apparent reference to the book when he talked about the difficulty of dealing with "the monster" of fan and ownership expectations for a championship team every year.

=== The Panic Virus ===
In 2011, Simon & Schuster published Mnookin's The Panic Virus: The True Story of the Vaccine-Autism Controversy. The book examines the history of the controversy over vaccines and autism, going back to a retracted 1998 study by Andrew Wakefield through to the current day. It is heavily critical of several public figures, including Jenny McCarthy, Oprah Winfrey, and Robert F. Kennedy, Jr.

In The Panic Virus, Mnookin tells the story of several parents who, after choosing to either skip or delay their children's vaccine schedule, saw their children contract easily avoidable diseases such as Haemophilus influenzae and Pertussis. He relays the accounts of parents who objected to or delay their children's vaccine schedules for various reasons such as ambivalence, religious objections, or even misguided information from external sources. He also highlights the Cedillo v. Secretary of Health and Human Services, beginning on June 11, 2007, in which the Cedillo family's lawsuit made the claim that Thiomersal, a compound found in Hepatitis B, DPT, and Hib vaccines, weakened their daughter's immune system such that the live measles virus found within the MMR vaccine overwhelmed her system and thereby caused Autism. After a lengthy process, the courts ruled against the Cedillo family, citing questionable witnesses and a large quantity of circumstantial evidence. Mnookin additionally focuses on the now-discredited Andrew Wakefield and his work as a main player in the vaccines-cause-autism argument. Wakefield is repeatedly mentioned, as is celebrity advocate against vaccination Jenny McCarthy, often in the context of anecdotes by parents outraged by the often one-sided exposure given to these figures in the media.

The Panic Virus was named one of the Wall Street Journal's Top Five Health and Medicine books of the year. The New York Times called it a "tour de force" and wrote that "[p]arents who want to play it safe, but are not altogether sure how, should turn with relief to this reasoned, logical and comprehensive analysis of the facts." Writing for the Wall Street Journal, Michael Shermer said it "should be required reading at every medical school in the world. ... a lesson on how fear hijacks reason and emotion trumps logic. — A brilliant piece of reportage and science writing." The Panic Virus was a finalist for the Los Angeles Times book prize in the "Current Interest" category. It won the New England Chapter of the American Medical Writers Association's Will Solimene Award for Excellence and the National Association of Science Writers 2012 "Science in Society" Award In 2011 Mnookin also brought out an Australian edition with a new preface which directly takes on the situation in Australia, documenting the behavior of antivaxxer Meryl Dorey and relaying the story of the McCafferys, who lost their four-week-old daughter Dana due to pertussis and low vaccination rates.

== Other work ==
Mnookin began his career in the mid '90s as a rock critic at a webzine called Addicted to Noise. His interviews with Morphine's Mark Sandman helped cement Sandman's reputation as being a contentious interview subject, and he was featured in the 2012 documentary "Cure for Pain: The Mark Sandman Story." He later worked at the Palm Beach Post, the Forward, and Brill's Content. Mnookin has written for many other newspapers and magazines, including GQ, New York magazine, Wired, the New Yorker, the Washington Post, the New York Times and the Boston Globe.

On October 7, 2012, Mnookin wrote an article of childhood vaccination entitled "Why So Many Parents Are Delaying or Skipping Vaccines" for the online portion of Parade magazine describing the reasoning of parents who either delay or skip their children's recommended vaccinations and the danger such logic may pose.

His articles for Vanity Fair include features on Bloomberg News and the New York Times' Iraq bureau, investigations into Judith Miller scandal at the New York Times and allegations that Dan Brown borrowed heavily from other books in The Da Vinci Code, and a profile of Stephen Colbert. Mnookin participated in coverage of the search for Tamerlan and Dzhokhar Tsarnaev, suspects in the Boston Marathon bombing, following the brothers from Cambridge, Massachusetts to Watertown, Massachusetts. On July 21, 2014, he published a story in the New Yorker about a family whose child was the first ever case of a rare genetic disease. He also has reviewed books about science and society for the New York Times Book Review.

== Personal life ==
During the 1990s, Mnookin struggled with overcoming heroin addiction, an experience he recounted in an article at Salon.com. His mother, Wendy Mnookin, has also written about his heroin addiction and subsequent recovery. He currently lives outside of Boston, Massachusetts with his wife, son, daughter, and dogs.

== Bibliography ==
=== Books ===
- Mnookin, Seth (2004). Hard news: the scandals at the New York Times and their meaning for American media. New York: Random House.
- — (2006). Feeding the monster : how money, smarts, and nerve took a team to the top. New York: Simon & Schuster.
- — (2011). The panic virus : a true story of medicine, science, and fear. New York: Simon & Schuster.
