= Losing Ground =

Losing Ground may refer to:

- Losing Ground (book), a critique of welfare programs by Charles Murray published in 1984
- Losing Ground (1982 film), an American film by Kathleen Collins
- Losing Ground (2005 film), an American film by Bryan Wizemann
- Losing Ground (2023 film), a Burmese short documentary film
- "Losing Ground" (song), a 1997 song by Groove Terminator
- "Losing Ground", a song by Italian band Disarmonia Mundi, from The Isolation Game
