= Colm Byrne =

Irish playwright

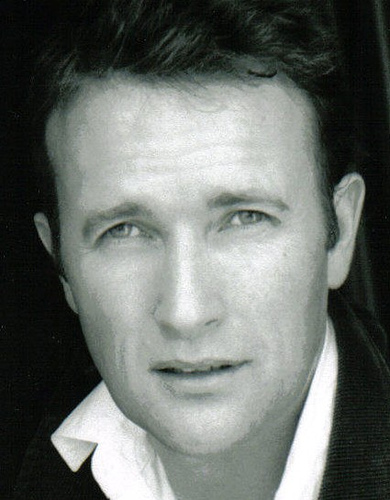
- Colm Byrne, Playwright, Ireland
- Born: 1966 (age 59–60); Limerick, Ireland
- Occupation: playwright

Colm Byrne (born 1966) is an Irish playwright. He was born in Limerick and lives in Galway. His plays have been noted as political, lively and poetic. He is a recipient of a Bay Area Critics Circle award and is a writer in residence with the LA Writer's Center.

== Works ==
=== Theatre ===
- Himself (2003) - Off-Broadway
- Bed Time for Bali (2005)
- Choke Point- The Downfall of Jayson Blair (2007) - Edinburgh Festival
- FreeFall:Heroes (2011)- Druid Theatre, Galway
- State of Limn (2010) - Flatlake Festival
- The Sum of All Things (2012) - Electric Picnic

=== Novels ===
- Jesus Wife (2014)

=== Film ===
- Losing Ground

== Sources ==
"Playwrights Database". Archived from the original on 7 June 2011.

"LA Writer's Center". Archived from the original on 1 July 2007.

"Edinburgh Fringe".

"Internet Movie Database".
