= Merchants of Truth =

2019 book

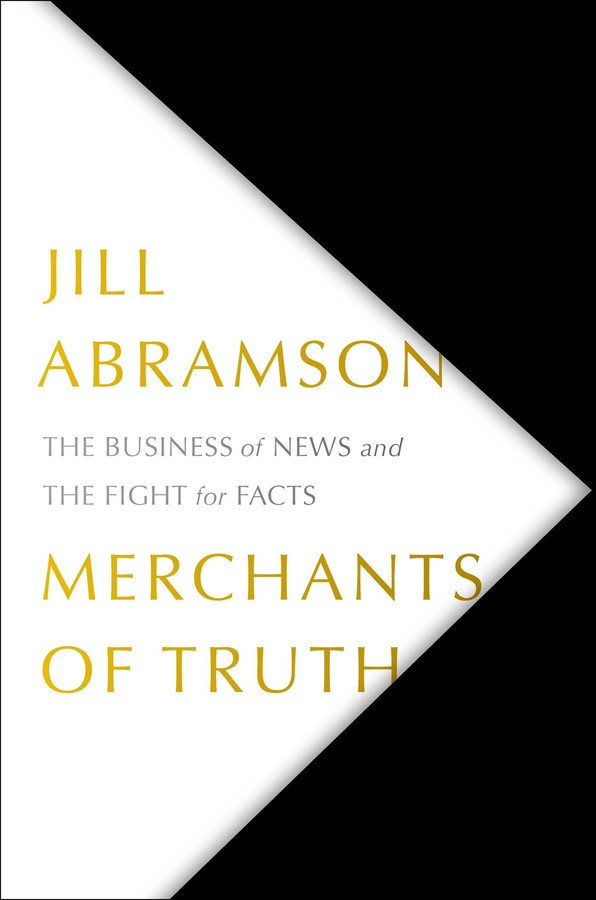
- Author: Jill Abramson
- Subject: Media & communication industries, journalism
- Publisher: Simon & Schuster
- Publication date: February 2019
- Pages: 544
- ISBN: 978-1-5011-2320-7

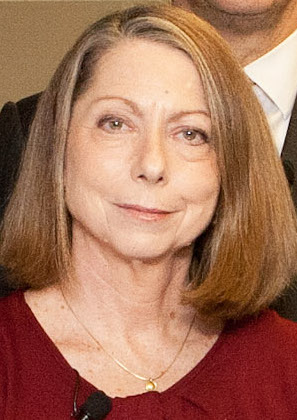
Abramson, 2012

Merchants of Truth: The Business of News and the Fight for Facts is a 2019 book by Jill Abramson that follows four news organizations—The New York Times, The Washington Post, BuzzFeed, and Vice News—through changes in news media technology and standards over the course of the 21st century. The author was formerly Executive Editor of The New York Times.

Multiple writers and journalists posted comparisons between previous texts and that of Abramson's book, which they presented as plagiarized. She responded by saying that she did not think plagiarism was an issue in her book. However, in an interview with NPR's Michel Martin, Abramson admitted she "fell short" in attributing her sources for some passages of the book.

Merchants of Truth was also criticized for various factual mistakes, causing the Columbia Journalism Review to highlight the book as an example of "the perils of publishing without a fact-checking net." Abramson expressed regret about the errors, but argued that "in a 500-page book I fear it’s inevitable that there are going to be some."

== Reception ==
Commercial reception of the book has been poor, due in part to the plagiarism controversy, with fewer than 3,000 copies being sold in its first week, according to BookScan.
