= Edward Baquet =

American restaurateur and civil rights activist

Eddie Baquet
- Born: March 26, 1922
- Died: September 21, 1993 (aged 71); New Orleans, Louisiana, U.S.
- Spouse: Myrtle Romano
- Culinary career
- Cooking style: Soul food Louisiana Creole cuisine
- Previous restaurant: Eddie's (1966—1984)

Edward Joseph Baquet Sr. (March 26, 1922 – September 21, 1993; pronounced bah-KAY) was an American restaurateur and civil rights activist. He owned Eddie's, a Louisiana Creole cuisine restaurant in Gentilly, New Orleans. He openly supported desegregation in the 1960s.

== Early life ==
Following service in the United States Army during World War II, Baquet went to work for the United States Postal Service as a mail carrier. Shortly thereafter, he began working evenings as a manager at Paul Gross Chicken Coop, which was a restaurant owned by his aunt Ada Baquet Gross and her husband, the restaurant being located in the Tremé neighborhood of New Orleans. Baquet first learned the restaurant business through his work there.

Baquet's family was prominent among the Louisiana Creole people. His uncle and aunt's restaurant, Paul Gross Chicken Coop, was one of a handful of restaurants owned by people of African-American descent in New Orleans at the time. Two of Baquet's uncles, George Baquet and Achille Baquet, were notable Jazz musicians.

== Restaurant career ==
In 1966, Baquet purchased Goodfella's Bar for USD $27,000, which he borrowed. He then re-opened the establishment as Eddie's Restaurant, which was located at 2119 Law Street in the 7th Ward of New Orleans. Baquet and his wife and children lived in the back portion of the restaurant. Baquet's wife Myrtle Baquet (née Romano) was the chef at the restaurant and remained in that capacity for the duration of its operation, creating significant awareness of the restaurant.

Eddie's Restaurant served Soul food and Louisiana Creole cuisine. Over time as the restaurant gained notoriety, Eddie's had a multi-racial clientele. During an appearance on The Tonight Show, actor Bill Cosby described in a humorous way his visit to Eddie's Restaurant, helping give the restaurant broad appeal, as Cosby declared it his favorite place to eat.

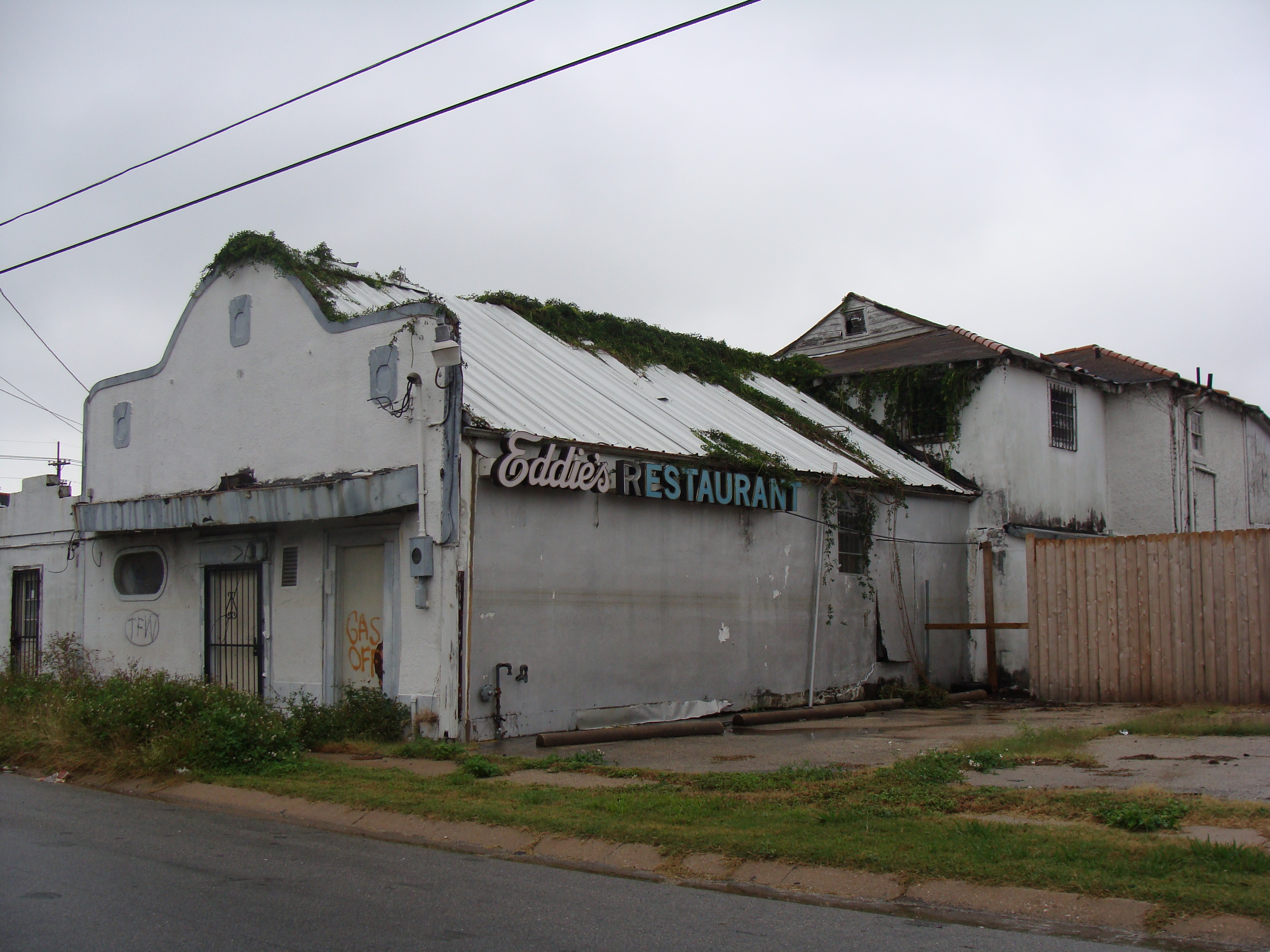
Eddie's Restaurant in a dilapidated state in 2008, years after closure

Baquet's son Wayne Baquet Sr. trained as a businessperson and subsequently entered the restaurant business with his parents. At the son's encouragement, Baquet and his family opened secondary locations (Note: The names and addresses of the secondary locations is uncertain.) such as Eddie's Fried Chicken and Hot Sausage.

A 1977 review by restaurant critic Richard Collin stated about Eddie's Restaurant, "This is one of the most gifted Creole kitchens in town and some of the best New Orleans dishes are served here in breathtaking versions." Collin also made note of the food quality despite the decrepit exterior of the restaurant.

Through much of his career, Baquet supported various civil rights campaigns in the New Orleans area, including sheltering protesters. He openly supported desegregation in the 1960s.

Baquet died of leukemia at University Hospital, New Orleans on September 21, 1993.

=== Activism ===
Baquet began his work as a civil rights activist while he was working at the Chicken Coop, which was the restaurant owned by his uncle Paul Gross. At that time, Baquet allowed civil rights protestors to come into the restaurant and provided safe harbor for them at a time and locale where protesting civil rights activism could be dangerous. For his on-going efforts as a civil rights activist, the local chapter of the NAACP recognized Baquet with an award in 1991.

== Legacy ==
Following Baquet's retirement in 1984, his son Wayne Sr, Wayne's wife and Wayne's son Wayne Baquet Jr remained in the restaurant business in New Orleans. Eddie's Restaurant closed in 1996, although their restaurant Li'l Dizzy's Cafe became notable for its creole food, in a style that Wayne Baquet Sr referred to as "creole soul". Edward Baquet and his family have opened twelve restaurants in the New Orleans area.

Li'l Dizzy's Cafe displays a portrait of Edward Baquet.

Baquet's son, Dean Baquet, became a prominent journalist and newspaper editor and served as the executive editor of The New York Times from May 2014 to June 2022. Baquet's son Terry Baquet became a journalist and editor for The Times-Picayune newspaper and other publications in the New Orleans area. Edward Baquet and his wife Myrtle Baquet had five sons together, Wayne, Terry, Rudolph, Edward Jr, and Dean.
