= John M. Geddes =

American journalist (1951–2026)

- Born: John Martin Geddes; November 19, 1951; Providence, Rhode Island, U.S.
- Died: October 20, 2026 (aged 74); New York City, U.S.
- Occupation: Journalist
- Notable credit: The New York Times
- Spouse(s): Irmgard Erica Wilksen (m. 1992; divorced); Jyll Holzman

John Martin Geddes (November 19, 1951 – October 20, 2026) was an American journalist who served as one of two managing editors of The New York Times. He was appointed to that post in 2003, and left it in 2013. Geddes served as managing editor for news operations. He and Jill Abramson were selected to replace former managing editor Gerald M. Boyd, who resigned after copyright infringements by Jayson Blair were found.

== Background ==
Geddes was born in Providence, Rhode Island, on November 19, 1951. He attended college at the University of Rhode Island, graduating in 1974 with a degree in economics, and obtained a master's degree in business journalism in 1976 from the University of Wisconsin–Madison. He later served as an Executive Advisory Board member for the Harrington School of Communication and Media at the University of Rhode Island.

During the late 1970s to early 1990s, Geddes primarily worked at The Wall Street Journal in editorial positions. He also was hired by both the Ansonia Evening Sentinel and the A.P.-Dow Jones News Service as a reporter. Geddes was a marketing research executive before becoming part of the staff for The New York Times in 1994. He started out as a business editor for becoming deputy managing editor in 1997. On January 18, 2013, Geddes announced he was accepting a buyout offer and would be leaving the Times.

In 2014 Geddes held a Shorenstein Fellowship at the Shorenstein Center on Media, Politics and Public Policy at the Harvard Kennedy School, during which he wrote about the collision of journalism and digital innovation as viewed by reporters and commentators covering technology. He was later managing editor for Bloomberg Politics directing its 2016 election coverage.

Geddes's first marriage, to Irmgard Erica Wilksen, ended in divorce; they had two children. He later married Jyll Holzman, a Times advertising executive. He died from lung disease at a hospital in Manhattan on October 20, 2026, at the age of 74.
