= Dean Baquet =

American journalist (born 1956)

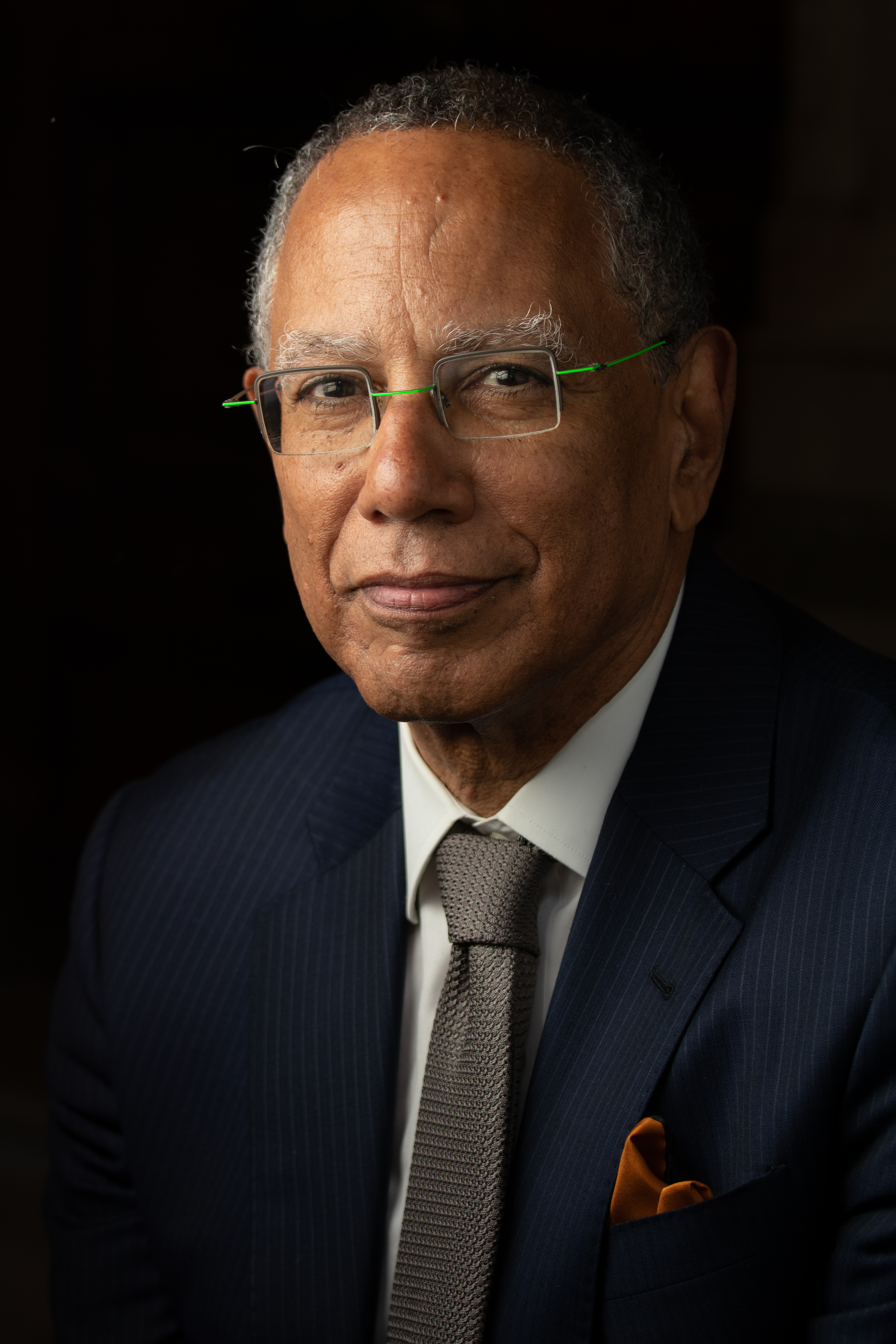
- Baquet in 2018
- Born: September 21, 1956 (age 69); New Orleans, Louisiana, U.S.
- Education: Columbia University (did not graduate)
- Occupations: Journalist; Editor
- Notable credit(s): The New York Times; Los Angeles Times; Chicago Tribune
- Spouse: Dylan Landis (m. 1986)
- Children: 1
- Father: Edward Baquet

Dean P. Baquet (/bæˈkeɪ/; born September 21, 1956) is an American journalist. He served as executive editor of The New York Times from May 2014 to June 2022. Between 2011 and 2014 Baquet was managing editor under the previous executive editor Jill Abramson. He is the first Black person to have led the newsroom.

A native of New Orleans, Baquet began his career in journalism there in the 1970s before moving to the Chicago Tribune in the 1980s. He joined The New York Times metro desk in 1990 and in 1995 became that paper's national editor, after having served as deputy metro editor. In 2000, he left to become managing editor, and later executive editor of the Los Angeles Times. He returned to The New York Times as Washington bureau chief in 2007, after he refused to implement management-desired newsroom budget cuts at the Los Angeles paper.

In 1988, Baquet shared a Pulitzer Prize for Investigative Journalism, leading a team of reporters that included William Gaines and Ann Marie Lipinski at the Chicago Tribune, for "their detailed reporting on the self-interest and waste" that plagued the Chicago City Council.

== Early life and education ==
Baquet was raised Catholic in Tremé, a working-class Creole neighborhood in New Orleans, Louisiana. He is the fourth of five sons of New Orleans restaurateur Edward Baquet.

Baquet graduated from St. Augustine High School in 1974. Baquet received a scholarship to study English at Columbia University, but dropped out shortly before graduation to pursue a career in journalism.

Baquet worked in New Orleans for almost a decade before leaving for the Chicago Tribune.

== Career ==
Video of Baquet's 2017 interview with Jay-Z for The New York Times

Baquet began his journalism career at the New Orleans States-Item, which later merged with The Times-Picayune. After six years at the Times-Picayune, he joined the Chicago Tribune in 1984, where he won the Pulitzer Prize, before joining The New York Times in April 1990 as an investigative reporter on the Metro desk. In May 1992, he became the special projects editor for the business desk. In January 1994, he held the same title, but he operated out of the executive editor's office. In 1996, he became national editor.

In 2000, he joined the Los Angeles Times as managing editor, working as editor John Carroll's "right-hand man". Baquet became the top editor in 2005 after Carroll resigned amid clashes with the Tribune Company, which had acquired the Los Angeles Times from the Chandler family in 2000. He was the first Black person to serve as the newspaper's top editor. Baquet was fired in 2006 after he publicly opposed plans to cut newsroom jobs.

Two months later, Baquet rejoined The New York Times as the Washington bureau chief. He became managing editor in September 2011, serving under executive editor Jill Abramson, and was promoted to executive editor on May 14, 2014. Baquet has made hiring reporters and editors of color a priority, saying that his efforts to diversify the newsroom have been "intense and persistent".

Baquet, whom U.S. President Donald Trump has attacked by name, has spoken out against Trump's anti-press rhetoric, telling The Guardian, "I think personal attacks on journalists, when he calls them names, I think he puts their lives at risk." Baquet was formerly on the board of directors of the Committee to Protect Journalists. In April 2022, The New York Times announced that Baquet would no longer be executive editor, and will be succeeded by Joseph Kahn. The company stated that it had plans for Baquet to lead a new venture and that he would remain at the paper, later announcing he would lead a fellowship program to train young journalists in local investigative journalism.

=== Notable stories ===
Baquet was awarded the Pulitzer Prize for Investigative Reporting in 1988, in recognition of a six-month investigation that he conducted alongside Chicago Tribune reporters William C. Gaines and Ann Marie Lipinski documenting corruption and influence-peddling in the Chicago City Council in a seven-part series. Baquet was also a finalist for the 1994 Pulitzer Prize for Investigative Reporting, for stories that exposed "fraud and mismanagement" at the largest U.S. non-profit health insurer.

Between 1990 and 1995 he reported on different cases of corruption and money laundering.

As managing editor at the Los Angeles Times, Baquet was involved in the newspaper's decision to publish, a few days before the 2003 California recall election, an article containing "a half-dozen credible allegations by women in the movie industry" that Arnold Schwarzenegger, a front-runner in the election, had sexually harassed them. The newspaper debated whether to withhold publication until after the election, ultimately deciding not to do so. In 2006, Brian Ross and Vic Walter of ABC News reported that Baquet and Los Angeles Times managing editor Douglas Frantz had made the decision to kill a planned Times story about NSA warrantless surveillance of Americans, acceding to a request made to them by the Director of National Intelligence John Negroponte and Director of the NSA Michael Hayden. Baquet confirmed that he had spoken with Negroponte and Hayden, but said that "government pressure played no role in my decision not to run the story", and that he and Frantz had determined that "we did not have a story, that we could not figure out what was going on" based on highly technical documents submitted by a whistleblower. Baquet's decision was criticized by Glenn Greenwald, who said that Baquet had "a really disturbing history of practicing this form of journalism that is incredibly subservient to the American national security state."

In the aftermath of the 2016 U.S. presidential election, Baquet explained to NPR that some mainstream media outlets were too secular for their own good. He said:

I think that the New York-based and Washington-based ... media powerhouses don't quite get religion. We have a fabulous religion writer, but she's all alone. We don't get religion. We don't get the role of religion in people's lives. And I think we can do much, much better. And I think there are things that we can be more creative about to understand the country.

Baquet later characterized an article in which The New York Times' public editor questioned whether the Times' prior coverage of President Trump's possible Russia ties had been unnecessarily and overly cautious as a "bad column" that comes to a "fairly ridiculous conclusion". In an interview after the Mueller report came in, Baquet said: "We wrote a lot about Russia, and I have no regrets. It’s not our job to determine whether or not there was illegality."

In 2019, The New York Times published the headline "Trump Urges Unity Vs. Racism", referring to Trump's speech on the 2019 El Paso shooting and the 2019 Dayton shooting. Baquet called it a "bad headline" but defended the Times' coverage of Trump. The next month, The New York Times published personal details about the whistleblower at the center of the impeachment inquiry against Donald Trump, a decision which Baquet defended.

== Personal life ==
In September 1986, Baquet married writer Dylan Landis. They live in Greenwich Village. He is Catholic.

== Awards and honors ==
In 1988, Baquet earned the Pulitzer Prize for Investigative Reporting for coverage of corruption in the Chicago City Council, as well as the Peter Lisagor Award for investigative reporting.

He received the Chicago Tribune's William H. Jones Award for Investigative Reporting in 1987, 1988, and 1989. He received an honorary degree from Loyola University New Orleans in 2013, was a guest speaker at Columbia College Class Day in 2016, and received the Reporters Committee for Freedom of the Press' Freedom of the Press Award in 2018.

In 2019, Baquet received the Larry Foster Award for Integrity in Public Communication at the Arthur W. Page Center Awards, the Norman C. Francis Leadership Institute National Leadership Award for Excellence, and was named one of the "35 most powerful people in New York media" by The Hollywood Reporter. He received an Honorary Doctor of Humane Letters from Xavier University of Louisiana in 2020.

In 2022, Baquet was honored by Syracuse University's S.I. Newhouse School of Public Communications with the Fred Dressler Leadership Award at the Mirror Awards ceremony in New York City.

== See also ==
- New Yorkers in journalism
- List of The New York Times controversies
- She Said (film)

Preceded by Jill Abramson	Executive editor of The New York Times; May 14, 2014 – June 2022	Incumbent
