= Losing Ground (2005 film) =

- Directed by: Bryan Wizemann
- Written by: Bryan Wizemann
- Produced by: Bryan Wizemann
- Starring: Eileen O'Connell; Kendall; Pigg Matthew Mark Meyer
- Cinematography: Mark Schwartzbard
- Edited by: Brad Studstrup
- Music by: Trevor de Clercq
- Release date: March 20, 2005
- Running time: 90 minutes
- Country: United States
- Language: English

Losing Ground is a 2005 independent film directed by Bryan Wizemann adapted from Wizemann's play of the same name. It follows seven people over the course of a single night in a Las Vegas video-poker bar, and their tangled interactions.

The film features the same cast as the stage performance and was filmed using high-definition video at The Gate, a bar in Park Slope. Losing Ground premiered at the Cinequest Film Festival on March 11, 2005, to generally favorable reviews. The film was distributed to a small number of theaters in New York City. It was released on DVD January 26, 2009.

== Cast ==
- Eileen O'Connell
- Kendall Pigg
- Matthew Mark Meyer
- Monique Vukovic
- Rhonda Keyser
- John Good
- Colm Byrne

== Stage production ==
The play initially ran at Tom Noonan's Paradise Theater from March 29, 2003, to April 13, 2003.
