= Macarena Hernandez =

American academic and journalist

Macarena Hernández is an American academic and journalist from La Joya, Texas. She has written about Latino issues such as immigration and education.

== Newspaper work and scandals ==
Hernández has a B.A. in English Professional Writing and Journalism from Baylor University, and a Masters in Journalism from University of California, Berkeley.

While in college, Hernandez interned at The New York Times, and following graduation, became the Rio Grande Valley Bureau Chief for the San Antonio Express-News. In 2003, a New York Times reporter who had interned alongside her, Jayson Blair, was caught plagiarizing a newspaper article she had written for the Express-News. The revelation uncovered dozens of other stories that Blair had plagiarized or fabricated for The Times, setting off a national media story.

Hernández joined the staff of The Dallas Morning News in August 2005. Soon after, she penned a column discussing the frequency with which illegal immigrants are the victims of crime in the United States, citing a Georgia case in which six Mexicans were murdered. When Fox's Bill O'Reilly expressed outrage that the Mexican flag was flown as a show of sorrow, Hernández accused O'Reilly of preaching hate. In retaliation, O'Reilly called for a boycott of the Dallas Morning News.

== Academic career and awards ==
Hernandez later became the Victoria Advocate Endowed Professor in Humanities and taught in the Communications Department at the University of Houston–Victoria, where she was co-founder and managing director of Centro Victoria, creating resources for Latino literature in the United States. She is now the Fred Hartman Distinguished Professor of Journalism at her alma mater, Baylor University.

In 2003, Latina named her one of their Women of the Year, and Hispanic Magazine named her one of 2004's Trendsetters. In 2006, the Los Angeles Times called her a "Media Face to Watch." In 2016 Hernandez was the recipient of a Creative Capital Award.
