= Gerald M. Boyd =

American journalist (1950–2006)

- Born: Gerald Michael Boyd; October 3, 1950; St. Louis, Missouri, US
- Died: November 23, 2006 (aged 56); New York City, U.S.
- Occupations: Journalist, newspaper editor, journalism consultant, lecturer
- Known for: Managing editor of The New York Times
- Spouse: Robin Stone
- Children: 1

Gerald Michael Boyd (October 3, 1950 – November 23, 2006) was an American journalist and editor. He was the first African-American metropolitan editor and managing editor at The New York Times, after joining the newspaper in 1983 in its Washington, D.C. bureau. A controversy in 2003 about the reporting of Jayson Blair forced both Boyd and the executive editor, Howell Raines, to resign that year.

Boyd started his journalism career in 1973 at the St. Louis Post-Dispatch, in his hometown city, after graduating from the University of Missouri. In 1977 he and a colleague, George Curry, founded the Greater St. Louis Association of Black Journalists. In addition, they established a program to train black high school students in the business. Raines received a Nieman Fellowship in 1979.

== Biography ==
Born in St. Louis, Missouri, Boyd had an older brother and younger sister. After their mother's death at a young age from sickle cell anemia, their father left the family and they were raised by their paternal grandmother. He attended local schools, including Soldan High School. There he worked on the high school newspaper and after school at a grocery store to earn money for the family. He won a full scholarship to the University of Missouri sponsored by the St. Louis Post-Dispatch, which also guaranteed him a job after graduation.

He joined the newspaper in 1973. Together with colleague, George Curry, in 1977 the two reporters founded the Greater St. Louis Association of Black Journalists. In addition, they established a program to train black high school students in the business.

After joining The New York Times in 1983, Boyd worked in the Washington, DC bureau. By the early 1990s, he moved to New York City, where he led coverage that won three Pulitzer Prizes:

- The 1993 World Trade Center bombing
- A series on children in poverty
- Race relations in the United States

Boyd also shared the leadership of The Times reporting following the September 11, 2001 attacks. The newspaper's coverage, including its published biographies of all known victims, earned a total of seven Pulitzer prizes. In 2002 Boyd won National Association of Black Journalists "Journalist of the Year" award.

Boyd and executive editor Howell Raines resigned in June 2003 in the wake of the Jayson Blair reporting controversy related to plagiarism and fabrication. They were said to have lost the support of the newsroom. He was succeeded by co-managing editors Jill Abramson and John M. Geddes.

After resigning, Boyd worked as a consultant. He also kept an office at the Columbia University Graduate School of Journalism. Boyd died in Manhattan at age 56 of complications from lung cancer.

== Personal life ==
Boyd was married three times. He and his third wife Robin Stone had a son.
