= Jonathan Landman =

American journalist (born 1952)

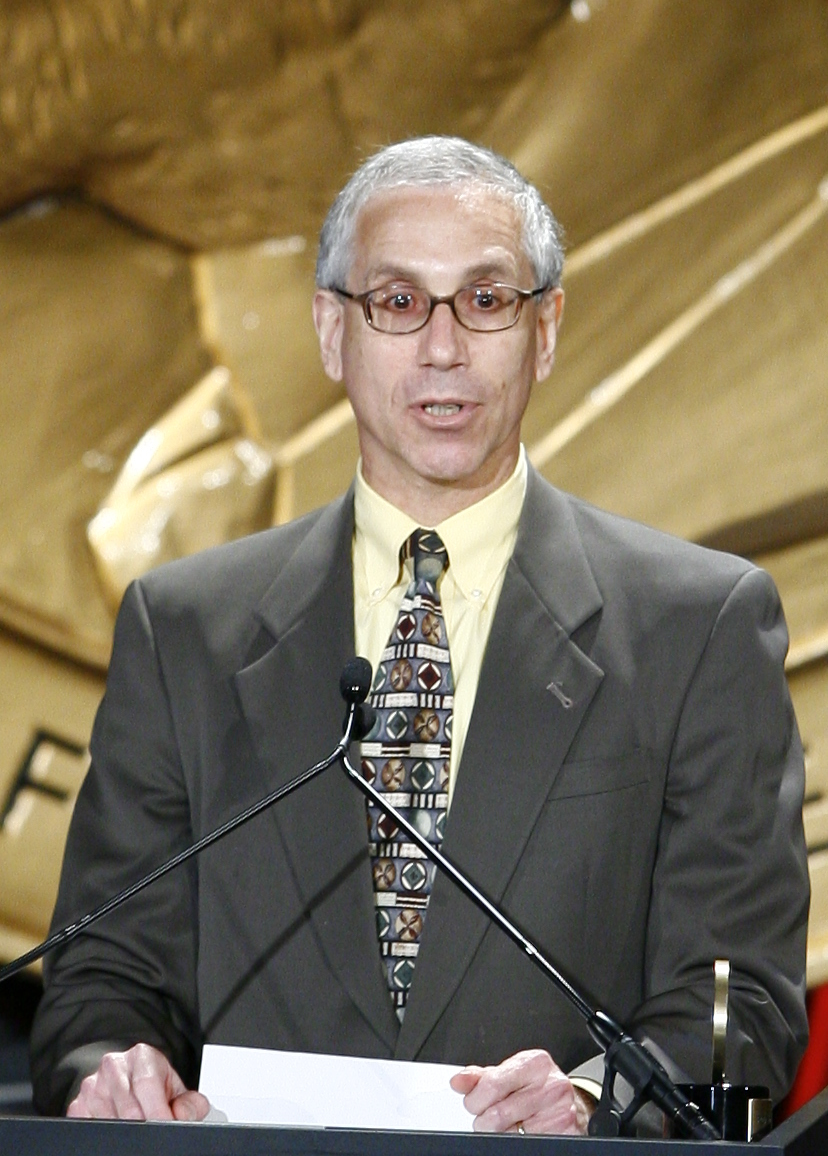
- Landman for NYTimes.com at the 68th Annual Peabody Awards
- Born: November 14, 1952 (age 72); New York City
- Occupation: journalist
- Notable credit: The New York Times

Jonathan I. Landman (born November 14, 1952) is an American journalist and editor-at-large for Bloomberg View, promoted in 2013, from his position as managing editor of Bloomberg's opinion section. Formerly the deputy managing editor at The New York Times, Landman became its deputy managing editor responsible for digital journalism for The Times in August 2005.

Born in New York City on November 14, 1952, Landman received a B.A. degree, magna cum laude, in American history from Amherst College, in 1974 and an M.S. degree in journalism from Columbia University Graduate School of Journalism in 1978. He is a member of the Amherst College Board of Trustees and a member of the faculty at The Writer's Institute of The Graduate Center at City University of New York. Landman is married and has two children.

== Work history ==
A timeline of Landmans work history, prior to joining Bloomberg, is listed below.

- May 2005 Landman had become assistant managing editor and member of The New York Times masthead
- 2004-2005 Times acting culture editor
- 2003-2004 Times assistant managing editor for enterprise
- 1999-2003 metropolitan editor of the Times
- 1994-1999 editor of The Times' Week in Review section (In 1995, Landman spent six months as acting Sunday business editor, supervising the new Money & Business section and six months, in 1996, as acting deputy metro editor)
- 1992-1994 deputy editor of the Times Washington bureau
- 1991-1992 assistant editor of the Times in Washington
- 1990-1991 assistant metropolitan editor, New York Times
- 1989-1990 assistant national editor, New York Times
- 1987 Landman joined The Times as a copy editor
- 1985-1987 deputy city editor at the New York Daily News
- 1984-1985 reporter at Newsday, where he covered Suffolk County, in 1984 and 1985.
- 1979-1984 reporter covering education, city hall and investigative news stories at the Chicago Sun-Times
- 1978-1979 Landman worked at The Ford Foundation as assistant to Fred W. Friendly, who was the program advisor of communications.
- 1977-1975 assistant editor at Scholastic Magazines
