= Jayson Blair =

American journalist (born 1976)

- Born: Jayson Thomas Blair; March 23, 1976 (age 50); Columbia, Maryland, U.S.
- Education: University of Maryland, College Park
- Occupations: Writer; journalist; life coach

Jayson Thomas Blair (born March 23, 1976) is an American former journalist who worked for The New York Times. In May 2003, he resigned from the newspaper following the revelation of fabrication and plagiarism within his articles.

In 2004, he published a memoir entitled Burning Down My Masters' House. He reflected on his career, discussed receiving a diagnosis of bipolar disorder following his resignation from the New York Times, and offered his perspective on race relations at the newspaper.

He subsequently established a bipolar disorder support group and pursued a life-coaching career.

== Background ==
Blair was born in Columbia, Maryland, the son of a federal executive and a schoolteacher. While attending the University of Maryland, College Park, he was a student journalist. For the 1996–1997 academic year, he was selected as the second African-American editor-in-chief of its student newspaper, The Diamondback. According to a 2004 article by the Baltimore Sun, "some of his fellow students opposed his selection, describing him as "an elbows-out competitor."

After a summer interning at The New York Times in 1998, Blair was offered an extended internship there. He declined in order to complete more coursework for graduation, but returned to the Times in June 1999. He postponed the year of coursework needed to complete his degree.

That November, he was classified as an "intermediate reporter" at The Times. He was later promoted to a full reporter.

== Plagiarism and fabrication scandal ==
On April 28, 2003, Blair received a call from Times national editor James Roberts asking him about similarities between a story he had written two days earlier and one published April 18 by San Antonio Express-News reporter Macarena Hernandez. The senior editor of the Express-News had contacted the Times about the similarities between Blair's article in the Times and Hernandez's article in his paper.

The resulting inquiry led to the discovery of fabrication and plagiarism in a number of articles written by Blair. Some fabrications include Blair's claims to have traveled to the city mentioned in the dateline, when in fact he did not.

Questionable articles included the following:

- In the October 30, 2002, piece "US Sniper Case Seen as a Barrier to a Confession", Blair wrote that a dispute between police authorities had ruined the interrogation of Beltway sniper suspect John Muhammad and that Muhammad was about to confess, quoting unnamed officials. This was swiftly denied by everyone involved. Blair also named certain lawyers who were not present as having witnessed the interrogation.
- In the February 10, 2003, piece "Peace and Answers Eluding Victims of the Sniper Attacks", Blair claimed to be in Washington. He allegedly plagiarized quotations from a Washington Post story and fabricated quotations from a person he had never interviewed. Blair ascribed a wide range of attributes to a man featured in the article, almost all of which the man in question denied. Blair also published information that he had promised was off the record.
- In the March 3, 2003, piece "Making Sniper Suspect Talk Puts Detective in Spotlight", Blair claimed to be in Fairfax, Virginia. He described a videotape of Lee Malvo, the younger defendant in the case, being questioned by police and quoted officials' review of the tape. No such tape existed. Blair also claimed a detective noticed blood on a man's jeans, leading to a confession (which had not occurred).
- In the March 27, 2003, piece "Relatives of Missing Soldiers Dread Hearing Worse News", Blair claimed to be in West Virginia. He allegedly plagiarized quotations from an Associated Press article. He claimed to have spoken to the father of Jessica Lynch, who had no recollection of meeting Blair; said "tobacco fields and cattle pastures" were visible from Lynch's parents' house when they were not; erroneously stated that Lynch's brother was in the National Guard; misspelled Lynch's mother's name; and fabricated a dream that he claimed she had had.
- In the April 3, 2003, piece "Rescue in Iraq and a 'Big Stir' in West Virginia", Blair claimed to have covered the Lynch story from her hometown of Palestine, West Virginia. Blair never traveled to Palestine, and his entire contribution to the story consisted of rearranged details from Associated Press stories.
- In the April 7, 2003, piece "For One Pastor, the War Hits Home", Blair wrote of a church service in Cleveland and an interview with the minister. Blair never went to Cleveland; he spoke to the minister by telephone, and copied portions of the article from an earlier Washington Post article. He also plagiarized quotations from The Plain Dealer and New York Daily News. He fabricated a detail about the minister keeping a picture of his son inside his Bible and got the name of the church wrong.
- In the April 19, 2003, piece "In Military Wards, Questions and Fears from the Wounded", Blair described interviewing four injured soldiers in a naval hospital. He had never gone to the hospital and had spoken to only one soldier by telephone, to whom he later attributed made-up quotes. Blair wrote that the soldier "will most likely limp the rest of his life and need to use a cane", which was untrue. He said another soldier had lost his right leg when it had been amputated below the knee. He described two soldiers as being in the hospital at the same time, but they were admitted five days apart.

After internal investigations, The New York Times reported on Blair's journalistic misdeeds in an "unprecedented" 7,239-word front-page story on May 11, 2003, headlined "Times Reporter Who Resigned Leaves Long Trail of Deception". The story called the affair "a low point in the 152-year history of the newspaper." Former New York Times stringer Milton Allimadi disputed this characterization, arguing that the editors knew the paper had reached much lower points during the 1960s into the 1980s, through a pattern of reporters and editors fabricating details for news stories from Africa.

After the scandal broke, some 30 former staffers of The Diamondback, who had worked with Blair when he was editor-in-chief at the university newspaper, signed a 2003 letter alleging that Blair had made four serious errors as a reporter and editor while at the University of Maryland. They said these and his work habits brought his integrity into question. The letter-signers alleged that questions raised by some of these staffers at the time were ignored by Maryland Media, Inc., the board that owned the paper.

== Aftermath ==
The investigation, known as the Siegal committee, found heated debate among the staff over affirmative action hiring, as Blair is black. Jonathan Landman, Blair's editor, told the Siegal committee he felt that Blair's being black played a large part in the younger man's initial promotion in 2001 to full-time staffer. "I think race was the decisive factor in his promotion," he said. "I thought then and I think now that it was the wrong decision."

Others disagreed. Five days later, New York Times op-ed columnist Bob Herbert, an African American, asserted in his column that race had nothing to do with the Blair case:

Listen up: the race issue in this case is as bogus as some of Jayson Blair's reporting... [F]olks who delight in attacking anything black, or anything designed to help blacks, have pounced on the Blair story as evidence that there is something inherently wrong with The New York Times's effort to diversify its newsroom, and beyond that, with the very idea of a commitment to diversity or affirmative action anywhere. And while these agitators won't admit it, the nasty subtext to their attack is that there is something inherently wrong with blacks.

Executive editor Howell Raines and managing editor Gerald Boyd resigned after losing newsroom support in the aftermath of the scandal.

After resigning from the Times, Blair struggled with severe depression. According to his memoir, he entered a hospital for treatment and was diagnosed with bipolar disorder for the first time. He has acknowledged that he had been self-medicating when he was dealing with substance abuse of alcohol and cocaine in earlier years.

== Later career ==
Blair later returned to college to complete his postponed degree.

The year after he left the Times, Blair wrote a memoir, Burning Down My Masters' House, published by New Millennium Books in 2004. Its initial print run was 250,000 copies; some 1,400 were sold in its first nine days. Although most reviews were critical, sales of the book increased after Blair was interviewed by Larry King and Fox News Channel host Bill O'Reilly.

In his book, Blair revealed extended substance abuse, which he had ended before he resigned from the newspaper, and a struggle with bipolar disorder, which was diagnosed and first treated after he resigned. He also discussed journalistic practices at the Times, and his view of race relations and disagreements among senior editors at the newspaper.

Since the scandal, Blair has spoken to journalism classes and groups about what he describes as the slippery slope that led him to fabricate and plagiarize. He has also said he regretted writing the book as early as he did and recommends that people not read it.

In 2006, Blair was running a support group for people with bipolar disorder. He has continued to receive treatment himself for this condition. In 2007 Blair started working as a life coach in Virginia. Three years later, he opened his own coaching center.

In 2023, Blair reentered journalism when he started a podcast called the "Silver Linings Handbook". It features interviews with people from different walks of life, including journalists, business people, family members of victims of crimes, attorneys, law enforcement and others. Blair also has advocated for more ethical reporting in the true crime genre. In 2024, he started a Substack called "The True Crime Times," where he is a writer and editor, with podcast hosts Brett Talley and Alice LaCour, American lawyers who had served in the Justice Department.

== In popular culture ==
- Choke Point, the play written by Colm Byrne and produced in 2007, is based on Blair's downfall.
- A play about Blair, CQ/CX, written by Gabe McKinley, was produced by the Atlantic Theater Company in 2012. McKinley knew Blair personally, having worked at the Times during the period Blair was there.
- Law & Order used the Blair story as the inspiration for Episode 14.02: "Bounty."
- In Law & Order: Criminal Intent, the Blair story inspired an episode about a young journalist in the third season episode "Pravda" (3.5).
- Season 5 of the HBO series The Wire dealt with the subject of journalistic fabrications, as well as the decline of print journalism. It mentions Jayson Blair in the last episode. The Wire creator David Simon had been a Baltimore Sun journalist and worked on The Diamondback, the student newspaper at the University of Maryland, College Park, where Blair was editor.
- A 2003 series of Pearls Before Swine comic strips portray Rat writing fraudulent New York Times stories about former Iraqi dictator Saddam Hussein.
- A scene in Gilmore Girls episode "The Reigning Lorelai" (4.16) shows Rory's editor, Doyle, becoming frustrated with the way Yale Daily News staffers act in the newsroom, calling it "the breeding ground for the next Jayson Blair".
- A documentary film featuring Jayson Blair was made by director/producer Samantha Grant. A Fragile Trust premiered at the Sheffield International Documentary Film Festival on June 14, 2013.
- The Simpsons based a joke on the Blair story in Episode 15.22, "Fraudcast News". Milhouse tells Lisa he's sorry but a story he "filed from Baghdad was all made up, (he) was actually in Basrah".
- During the White House Correspondents' Dinner in 2008, Craig Ferguson remarked, "The New York Times unfortunately did not buy a table. They feel—I just want to make sure I get this right—they felt that this event undercuts the credibility of the press. It's funny, you see I thought that Jayson Blair and Judy Miller took care of that."

== See also ==
- Journalism scandals
- Fake news

== Bibliography ==
- Blair, Jayson (2004). Burning Down My Masters' House: My Life at the New York Times. New Millennium Press. ISBN 978-1-932407-26-6.
