= Howell Raines =

American journalist (born 1943)

Howell Hiram Raines

Executive editor of The New York Times
- In office 2001–2003
- Preceded by: Joseph Lelyveld
- Succeeded by: Bill Keller

Personal details
- Born: February 5, 1943 (age 83)

Howell Hiram Raines (/ˈhaʊəl ˈreɪnz/ HOW-əl RAYNZ; born February 5, 1943) is an American journalist, editor, and writer. He was executive editor of The New York Times from 2001 until he left in 2003 in the wake of the scandal related to reporting by Jayson Blair. In 2008, Raines became a contributing editor for Condé Nast Portfolio, writing the magazine's media column. After beginning his journalism career working for Southern newspapers, he joined The Times in 1978, as a national correspondent based in Atlanta. His positions included political correspondent and bureau chief in Atlanta and Washington, DC, before joining the New York City staff in 1993.

Raines has also published a novel, two memoirs, an oral history of the civil rights movement, and a history of the Union soldiers from Alabama who played a decisive role in the Civil War and were scrubbed from the history books.

== Early life and career ==
Raines was born in Birmingham, Alabama. He earned a bachelor's degree from Birmingham–Southern College in 1964 and a master's degree in English from the University of Alabama in 1973. In September 1964, Raines began his newspaper career as a reporter for the Birmingham Post-Herald in Alabama. He also reported for WBRC-TV in Birmingham.

After a year as a reporter at the Birmingham News, in 1971 Raines was selected as political editor of the Atlanta Constitution. In 1976 he left that post to become political editor at the St. Petersburg Times.

== The New York Times ==
Raines joined The New York Times in 1978, as a national correspondent based in Atlanta. By 1979, Raines was promoted to Atlanta's bureau chief, a position he held until 1981, when he became a national political correspondent.

By the next year, Raines had advanced to become a White House correspondent for The Times. He progressed to management in 1985, becoming deputy Washington editor. In 1987, Raines transferred to London and worked as the newspaper's London bureau chief. The next year, he returned to Washington, D.C., to become the city's bureau chief.

In 1992, Raines published an essay, "Grady's Gift", about his childhood in Alabama. He fondly described the family's black housekeeper. His memoir was awarded the Pulitzer Prize for Feature Writing.

In 1993, Raines moved to New York City as the Times editorial page editor, a position he held for eight years. The aggressive, colloquial style of his editorials, especially those critical of President Bill Clinton and his administration, drew widespread notice and a share of criticism. His work marked a departure from the measured tone for which Times editorials had been known.

Raines was appointed executive editor of The Times in September 2001, serving until May 2003. At that time, controversy generated by the reporting scandal related to Jayson Blair led to his dismissal. A Times internal investigation revealed that 36 of the 73 national stories Blair filed with the paper over a six-month period were marred by errors, false datelines, or evidence of plagiarism. Raines was faulted for continuing to publish Blair months after the paper's metro editor, Jonathan Landman, sent him a memo urging him "to stop Jayson from writing for The Times. Right now."

The Blair inquiry also revealed widespread discontent among Times staffers over Raines' management style, which was described as arbitrary and heavy-handed. According to a New York Times article, the deputy metropolitan editor, Joe Sexton, was quoted as telling Raines and managing editor Gerald Boyd, at a closed meeting of employees, "I believe that at a deep level you guys have lost the confidence of many parts of the newsroom ... People feel less led than bullied." On another occasion Jerelle Kraus, art director for the newspaper's weekend section, was quoted as saying, "I hope things settle down and we get a decent executive editor who's reasonable. Howell Raines is someone who is feared." Both Raines and Boyd resigned.

The paper's owner, Arthur Ochs Sulzberger, Jr., also conducted an investigation and concluded that Raines had alienated most of the New York and Washington bureaus. Raines' resignation, along with that of Gerald Boyd, was announced in the June 5, 2003 issue of The Times.

Joseph Lelyveld, who had been executive editor of The Times from 1994 to 2001, agreed to replace Raines on an interim basis. On July 14, 2003, it was announced that Bill Keller had been chosen as Raines' permanent replacement. In an interview on the Charlie Rose Show of July 11, Raines admitted that Sulzberger had "asked [him] to step aside."

== Later activities ==
Raines reviewed his tenure as executive editor of the New York Times in a 21,000-word piece published in the May 2004 issue of The Atlantic. In it, he said that he was hired by Sulzberger in the shared conviction that The Times had grown complacent and no longer functioned as a meritocracy in the assignment of stories to reporters.

In the private meeting with reporters called by Sulzberger, in which the owner announced Keller's succession to Raines' old job, Sulzberger reportedly denied ever holding such a view. Raines stood by his account and implied that Sulzberger was retreating from the position which he said he and the owner shared at the time of his promotion.

In the only interview I have given on the Jayson Blair affair, I spoke on the Charlie Rose show of the resistance I had encountered as a 'change agent' who was handpicked by the publisher to confront the newsroom's lethargy and complacency. A few days later, as he introduced my successor, Bill Keller, to the assembled staff, Arthur [Ochs Sulzberger, Jr.] rebutted my comment by saying, 'There's no complacency here—never has been, never will be.' I can guarantee that no one in that newsroom, including Arthur himself, believed what he said ... Arthur's words signaled that nothing dramatic would be done to upset the paper's cosseted world.

Raines revisited the controversy in his 2006 book, The One That Got Away. It combines fishing stories and a review of his career as a journalist and editor. He assessed the events preceding the Jayson Blair scandal and his own dismissal. On January 14, 2008, Condé Nast Portfolio announced that Raines would become its media columnist. His first column, published in the March issue, analyzed the possibility of Rupert Murdoch buying the New York Times, which he said would have deeply adverse consequences. Raines published an op-ed in the March 14, 2010, edition of The Washington Post that was highly critical of Fox News Channel. He suggested its biased reporting was not sufficiently criticized by legitimate media.

== Books by Raines ==
External videos
- Booknotes interview with Raines on Fly Fishing Through the Midlife Crisis, May 1, 1994, C-SPAN
- Discussion with Raines on The One That Got Away: A Memoir, at the Aspen Institute, July 20, 2006, C-SPAN

In addition to his 2006 memoir, Raines' books have included a novel, Whiskey Man (1977); an oral history of the civil-rights movement, My Soul Is Rested: Movement Days in the Deep South Remembered (1983); the best-selling memoir Fly Fishing Through the Midlife Crisis (1993); and Silent Cavalry: How Union Soldiers from Alabama Helped Sherman Burn Atlanta--and Then Got Written Out of History (2023).

== Family ==
Raines's son Ben was the discoverer of the remains of the last known ship to bring Africans as slaves to the United States, the Clotilda, in Alabama waters in 2019.

His other son, Jeff, is a guitarist for the New Orleans band Galactic.
