= History of The New York Times (1945–1998) =

Aspect of newspaper history

Following World War II, The New York Times continued to expand. The Times was subject to investigations from the Senate Internal Security Subcommittee, a McCarthyist subcommittee that investigated purported communism from within press institutions. Arthur Hays Sulzberger's decision to dismiss a copyreader who plead the Fifth Amendment drew anger from within the Times and from external organizations. In April 1961, Sulzberger resigned, appointing his son-in-law, The New York Times Company president Orvil Dryfoos. Under Dryfoos, The New York Times established a newspaper based in Los Angeles. In 1962, the implementation of automated printing presses in response to increasing costs mounted fears over technological unemployment. The New York Typographical Union staged a strike in December, altering the media consumption of New Yorkers. The strike left New York with three remaining newspapers—the Times, the Daily News, and the New York Post—by its conclusion in March 1963. In May, Dryfoos died of a heart ailment. Following weeks of ambiguity, Arthur Ochs Sulzberger became The New York Times's publisher.

Technological advancements leveraged by newspapers such as the Los Angeles Times and improvements in coverage from The Washington Post and The Wall Street Journal necessitated adaptations to nascent computing. The New York Times published "Heed Their Rising Voices" in 1960, a full-page advertisement purchased by supporters of Martin Luther King Jr. criticizing law enforcement in Montgomery, Alabama for their response to the civil rights movement. Montgomery Public Safety commissioner L. B. Sullivan sued the Times for defamation. In New York Times Co. v. Sullivan (1964), the U.S. Supreme Court ruled that the verdict in Alabama county court and the Supreme Court of Alabama violated the First Amendment. The decision is considered to be landmark. After financial losses, The New York Times ended its international edition, acquiring a stake in the Paris Herald Tribune, forming the International Herald Tribune. The Times initially published the Pentagon Papers, facing opposition from then-president Richard Nixon. The Supreme Court ruled in The New York Times's favor in New York Times Co. v. United States (1971), allowing the Times and The Washington Post to publish the papers.

The New York Times remained cautious in its initial coverage of the Watergate scandal. As Congress began investigating the scandal, the Times furthered its coverage, publishing details on the Huston Plan, alleged wiretapping of reporters and officials, and testimony from James W. McCord Jr. that the Committee for the Re-Election of the President paid the conspirators off. The exodus of readers to suburban New York newspapers, such as Newsday and Gannett papers, adversely affected The New York Times's circulation. Contemporary newspapers balked at additional sections; Time devoted a cover for its criticism and New York wrote that the Times was engaging in "middle-class self-absorption". The New York Times, the Daily News, and the New York Post were the subject of a strike in 1978, allowing emerging newspapers to leverage halted coverage. The Times deliberately avoided coverage of the AIDS epidemic, running its first front page article in May 1983. Max Frankel's editorial coverage of the epidemic, with mentions of anal intercourse, contrasted with then-executive editor A. M. Rosenthal's puritan approach, intentionally avoiding descriptions of the luridity of gay venues.

Following years of waning interest in The New York Times, Sulzberger resigned in January 1992, appointing his son, Arthur Ochs Sulzberger Jr., as publisher. The Internet represented a generational shift within the Times; Sulzberger, who negotiated The New York Times Company's acquisition of The Boston Globe in 1993, derided the Internet, while his son expressed antithetical views. @times appeared on America Online's website in May 1994 as an extension of The New York Times, featuring news articles, film reviews, sports news, and business articles. Despite opposition, several employees of the Times had begun to access the Internet. The online success of publications that traditionally co-existed with the Times—such as America Online, Yahoo, and CNN—and the expansion of websites such as Monster.com and Craigslist that threatened The New York Times's classified advertisement model increased efforts to develop a website. nytimes.com debuted on January 19 and was formally announced three days later. The Times published domestic terrorist Ted Kaczynski's essay Industrial Society and Its Future in 1995, contributing to his arrest after his brother David recognized the essay's penmanship.

== 1945–1955: Continued period and staff changes ==
In November 1945, the 44th Street Theatre was demolished. In its place, 229 West 43rd Street was expanded, leaving the building adjacent to Sardi's and the Paramount Theatre. By February 1948, the annex was combined with the old building, improving production capacity by more than half. The expansion gave the composing room a total of 40,000 ft^{2} (3,700 m^{2}) and more than one hundred linecasting type machines. In April 1950, additional floorage was provisioned to WQXR and WQXR-FM. By 1951, the Times had an editorial staff of 1,350; despite its size, the paper was an agile news machine. On April 11, 1951, at 1 a.m., MacArthur was relieved of his duties by Harry S. Truman. Within the hour, White House correspondent William H. Lawrence had dictated the story and sent it to the presses. At the Keith-Albee Building, the Times's Washington, D.C. bureau watched MacArthur address Congress the following week. Among the staff present was Anthony Leviero, the former White House correspondent before Lawrence who traveled to Wake Island with MacArthur and Truman for a conference. Leviero hastily penned a story detailing the conference, including MacArthur's assertion that China would not intervene in the Korean War—an event that resulted in a series of defeats ultimately leading to MacArthur's relief.

In December 1951, James died. He was succeeded by Turner Catledge. Under Catledge, The New York Times established daily news conferences in his office, eliminating the role of bullpen editors—such as Neil MacNeil—who determined the placement of stories and their size relative to the paper. Catledge staffed several positions, including appointing Robert Garst and Theodore Menline Bernstein as associate editors. According to Gay Talese, Catledge favored Bernstein; Garst was delegated to housekeeping roles and as acting managing editor. In 1953, Times photoengravers went on strike for two weeks. During the strike, The New York Times did not publish for the first time in its history. Supported by most Times employees, staff who crossed the picket line were ostracized. John Randolph was removed as picture editor in January 1954 after placing a photograph of newlyweds Marilyn Monroe and Joe DiMaggio kissing on the front page. Clifton Daniel became The New York Times's Moscow correspondent—the only permanent Russian correspondent for a Western newspaper—in 1954; Catledge ordered Daniel back to New York on Arthur Hays Sulzberger's orders in November 1955 after Daniel developed an ulcer.

== 1955–1961: McCarthyism and Sulzberger's resignation ==
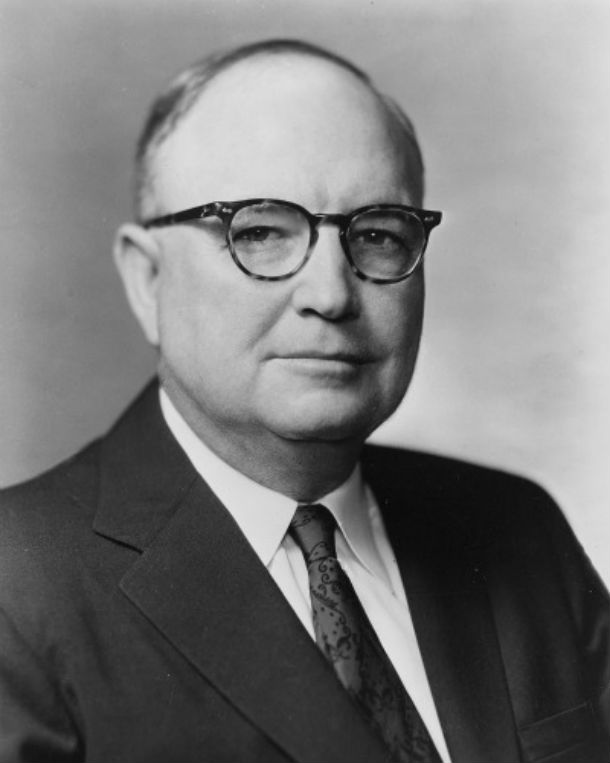
Senator James Eastland investigated the Times in 1955 and 1956.

The New York Times was subject to intense investigations by the Senate Internal Security Subcommittee, a Senate subcommittee that advanced McCarthyism and investigated purported communism from within press institutions. From December 1955 to January 1956, forty-four subpoenas were issued against current or former employees of the Times. The investigations divided the staff of The New York Times, comprising current Communist Party USA members—including a copyeditor caught editing a Times dispatch from Moscow, former members turned conservatives, and opponents of McCarthyism. The New York Times's management reckoned with retaining Ochs's values and denouncing the investigation; Times management believed that the paper was being specifically singled out for its opposition to Senate Internal Security Subcommittee chairman James Eastland's values, as well as those of his colleague William E. Jenner and subcommittee counsel J. G. Sourwine, by condemning segregation in Southern schools, the methods used by other congressional committees, and McCarthyism.

Sulzberger believed that The New York Times was not a sacrosanct institution above a congressional investigation and stated his opposition to communism, urging employees not to plead the Fifth Amendment. A Times copyreader who did not reveal his political leanings appeared before the Senate Internal Security Subcommittee and plead the Fifth Amendment; Sulzberger dismissed the copyreader. The American Civil Liberties Union issued a letter of protest as a result of the dismissal. Sulzberger published the letter and his response in The New York Times. The letter polarized readers and was poorly received in some quarters, including by Ochs's nephew John Bertram Oakes. Sulzberger and his son-in-law, The New York Times Company president Orvil Dryfoos, drafted a statement in November 1955 to justify dismissing further employees. The rising cost of newspaper production and the recession of 1958 cut into The New York Times's profits in the years following the investigations. By 1959, Sunday edition numbers necessitated a west side expansion of 229 West 43rd Street. The annex was used primarily for publishing the Sunday issue, which had a circulation of 1,600,000 by 1967 and varied in weight between four and seven pounds.

Times reporter Herbert Matthews' articles in the late 1950s, which consistently supported the idea that Fidel Castro would hold free elections and restore the Cuban constitution, played a significant role in U.S. foreign policy and helped persuade Washington to cease shipments of arms to Fulgencio Batista. In 1959, Castro awarded a medal to The Times and wrote: "To our American friend Herbert Matthews with gratitude. Without your help, and without the help of the New York Times, the Revolution in Cuba would never have been."

Dryfoos's role in The New York Times increased after 1958, when Sulzberger suffered a stroke. In January 1961, following an account in The Nation, a Times correspondent in Guatemala reported of an offensive against Cuba. Correspondent Tad Szulc was in Miami while being transferred from Rio de Janeiro to Washington, D.C. and discovered invasion plans on the Bay of Pigs. Szulc appeared to Dryfoos and Catledge to inform them of the invasion; both men were hesitant to publish the story, with Dryfoos believing that the Times could be blamed for bloodshed if the invasion failed. The men called James Reston, Sulzberger's assistant, who advised them not to publish "any dispatch that would pinpoint the timing of the landing". The decision was criticized by Bernstein and news editor Lewis Jordan. The Bay of Pigs invasion in April 1961 was a failure for the United States; then-president John F. Kennedy summoned Catledge to chide him for not publishing further information. On April 25, 1961, amid poor health, Sulzberger resigned and appointed Dryfoos as his successor. As publisher, Dryfoos sought to expand The New York Times into the Pacific Coast. The endeavor was a logistical challenge for the Times, which insisted on using Linotype machines. The New York Times diverted the Western editions copies to Teletypesetters that could transmit keystrokes to Los Angeles. Led by Andrew Fisher, the Western edition was identical to the New York paper.

== 1961–1964: Newspaper strike and Dryfoos's death ==
By 1962, increasing newspaper production costs, higher wage demands, and the emergence of television advertising presented existential threats to the newspaper industry. In response, publishers implemented automated printing presses. Typographers viewed the automated machines as an attempt to replace them. The New York chapter of the International Typographical Union was led by Bert Powers, who regularly disputed with publishers; Powers advocated for higher wages, bolstered pension and welfare funds, and additional sick days. Powers particularly feared automatic typesetting machines and believed that printers should develop their own identity. On December 8, 1962, the New York Typographical Union declared a strike against The New York Times, the Daily News, the New York Journal American, and the New York World-Telegram & Sun. Printers picketed outside the offices of their publishers, inadvertently affecting the New York Daily Mirror, the New York Herald Tribune, the New York Post, the Long Island Star Journal, and the Long Island Daily Press, who were forced to stop their presses and lock their doors.

The strike immediately affected the routine media consumption habits of New Yorkers; some readers abandoned newspapers altogether, turning to television, news magazines, or books. Other readers who continued to read newspapers read The New York Times through the paper's Western edition mailed from California or turned to other newspapers such as The Wall Street Journal and Women's Wear Daily, including out-of-state newspapers such as The Philadelphia Inquirer and The Christian Science Monitor. Financially, printers were supported by union funds and state insurance; newspaper and business owners were most affected. New York mayor Robert F. Wagner Jr. and labor negotiator Theodore W. Kheel were able to forge an agreement on March 31, 1963. The agreement guaranteed a thirty-five hour workweek, achieved a common contract expiration date, limited the use of automated equipment, and increased salaries. The strike left New York with three remaining papers—The New York Times, the Daily News, and the New York Post—from a dozen in 1930.

Following the strike, Dryfoos visited Puerto Rico. While in Puerto Rico, he was administered to a hospital in San Juan for an illness. Dryfoos was then flown to Columbia-Presbyterian Medical Center in New York, where he was pronounced dead on May 25 of a heart ailment, potentially due to the strike. Dryfoos was mourned by Kennedy, secretary of state Dean Rusk, United Nations secretary-general U Thant, politician Adlai Stevenson II, French statesman Jean Monnet, then-president of Mexico Adolfo López Mateos, Nigerian politician Jaja Wachuku, and his funeral at Temple Emanu-El attracted two thousand mourners. After Dryfoos was buried, weeks of ambiguity followed as The New York Times did not have a publisher to replace him; the Sulzberger family believed that he would live through the 1970s. Arthur Hays Sulzberger was restricted to a wheelchair, while his son, Arthur Ochs Sulzberger, did not have enough experience to run the paper. Arthur Ochs's mother, Iphigene Ochs Sulzberger, favored Reston. On June 20, Arthur Hays announced that Arthur Ochs would become The New York Times's next publisher, the youngest person to serve the role.

== 1964–1966: Second Sulzberger era and New York Times Co. v. Sullivan ==
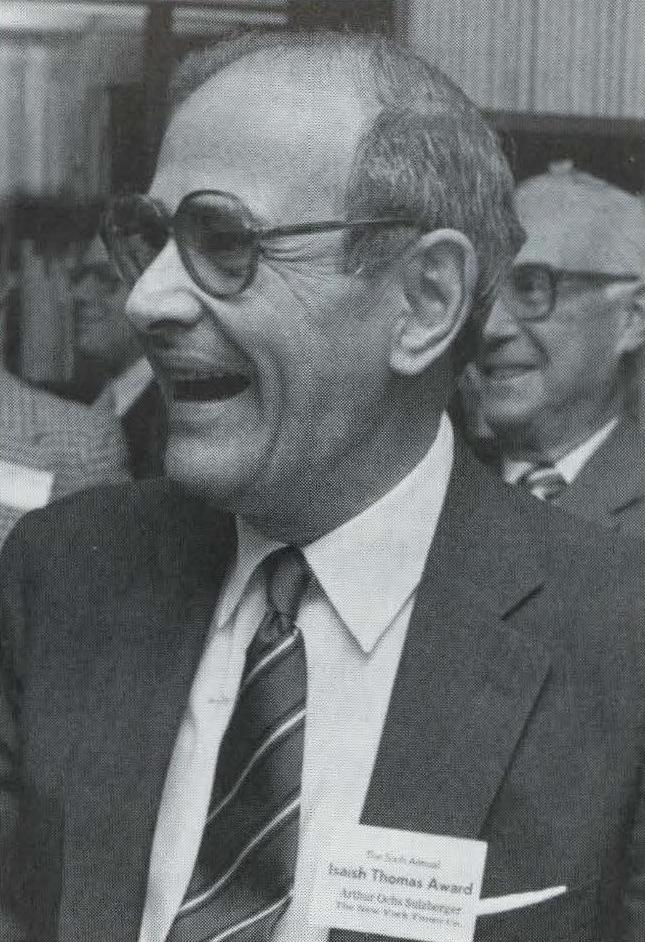
Arthur Ochs Sulzberger became the publisher of The New York Times in 1963.

Dryfoos's death brought significant alterations to The New York Times. Following Sulzberger's accession, general manager and vice president Amory Bradford resigned; Bradford's reputation was tarnished after an article by A. H. Raskin following the strike besmirched him and accused him of being pugnacious. Bradford was succeeded by Harding F. Bancroft, a descendant of churchman Richard Bancroft. The Times retained many of its executives and printed their names above the editorial page. In January 1964, Sulzberger ceased publication of the Western edition that had routinely been published since October 1962. Though Iphigene Ochs Sulzberger was one of the wealthiest women in the United States at the time—her net worth was estimated by Fortune to be between US$150 million (equivalent to US$1.39 billion in 2025) and US$200 million (equivalent to US$1.85 billion in 2025) by 1968—the strike cut deep into the Times's reserves and circulation numbers for the Western edition decreased despite demand for the Times in the Pacific Coast.

Sulzberger believed that The New York Times could not follow in his father or grandfather's footsteps, holding tradition inviolable but adjusting to nascent technologies and adapting to a precarious newspaper industry. The Washington Post and The Wall Street Journal began to improve their coverage, occasionally providing superior political and economic coverage than the Times, and the Los Angeles Times led the United States in advertising lineage, bolstered by the diversified Times Mirror Company. The Los Angeles Times began to modernize its advertising sector with computing, analyzing circulation trends; The New York Times began modernizing in 1964 with the purchase of a Honeywell 200 that would perform the accounting work of twenty-five employees. The Honeywell 200 was placed in a windowless room on the seventh floor of 229 West 43rd Street. Despite his fiscally-driven changes, Sulzberger did not cede on The New York Times's coverage. The Times continued to publish full texts of speeches and documents such as the Warren Commission report on the assassination of John F. Kennedy.

In an attempt to centralize executive authority and dismiss elderly employees, Sulzberger appointed Turner Catledge executive editor on September 1, 1964, a newly created post that gave Catledge more control over The New York Times's content. Catledge's position allowed him to serve as a regent for the journalistically unaware Sulzberger. Catledge's promotion drew the ire of Lester Markel, the displaced head of the Sunday Times, who was not supportive of his collectivist ambitions nor Bernstein's additions that drew from Markel's former prerogatives; most of all, Markel believed that The New York Times was no longer above other papers and no longer held itself in an esteemed position. Dryfoos's death shifted editorial weight from Washington to New York, particularly after the resignation of Reston's associate Wallace Carroll. Sulzberger did not seek to lose Reston, the Washington bureau chief, and made him an associate editor; Sulzberger appointed Tom Wicker as his successor on Reston's behest, much to Moscow correspondent Max Frankel's scorn.

The New York Times erroneously claimed that thirty-eight witnesses saw or heard the murder of Kitty Genovese in March 1964 but did not act upon the attack. Times reporter Martin Gansberg's figure gained weight with Loudon Wainwright Jr.'s reporting in Life and editor A. M. Rosenthal's book Thirty-Eight Witnesses (1964). Rosenthal stated that he heard the number thirty-eight from then-police commissioner Michael J. Murphy at Emil's Restaurant and Bar. Then-attorney general Charles Skoller told Jim Rasenberger in 2004 that there were "half a dozen that saw what was going on"; Skoller's interview was republished in the Times. The New York Times acknowledged its error in Robert D. McFadden's obituary of perpetrator Winston Moseley in 2016. The murder of Kitty Genovese was an early example of the bystander effect based on the Times's reporting and has been attributed to the creation of 9-1-1 in the United States. One witness claimed that his father called the police, reporting that a woman was "beat up" and "staggering around".

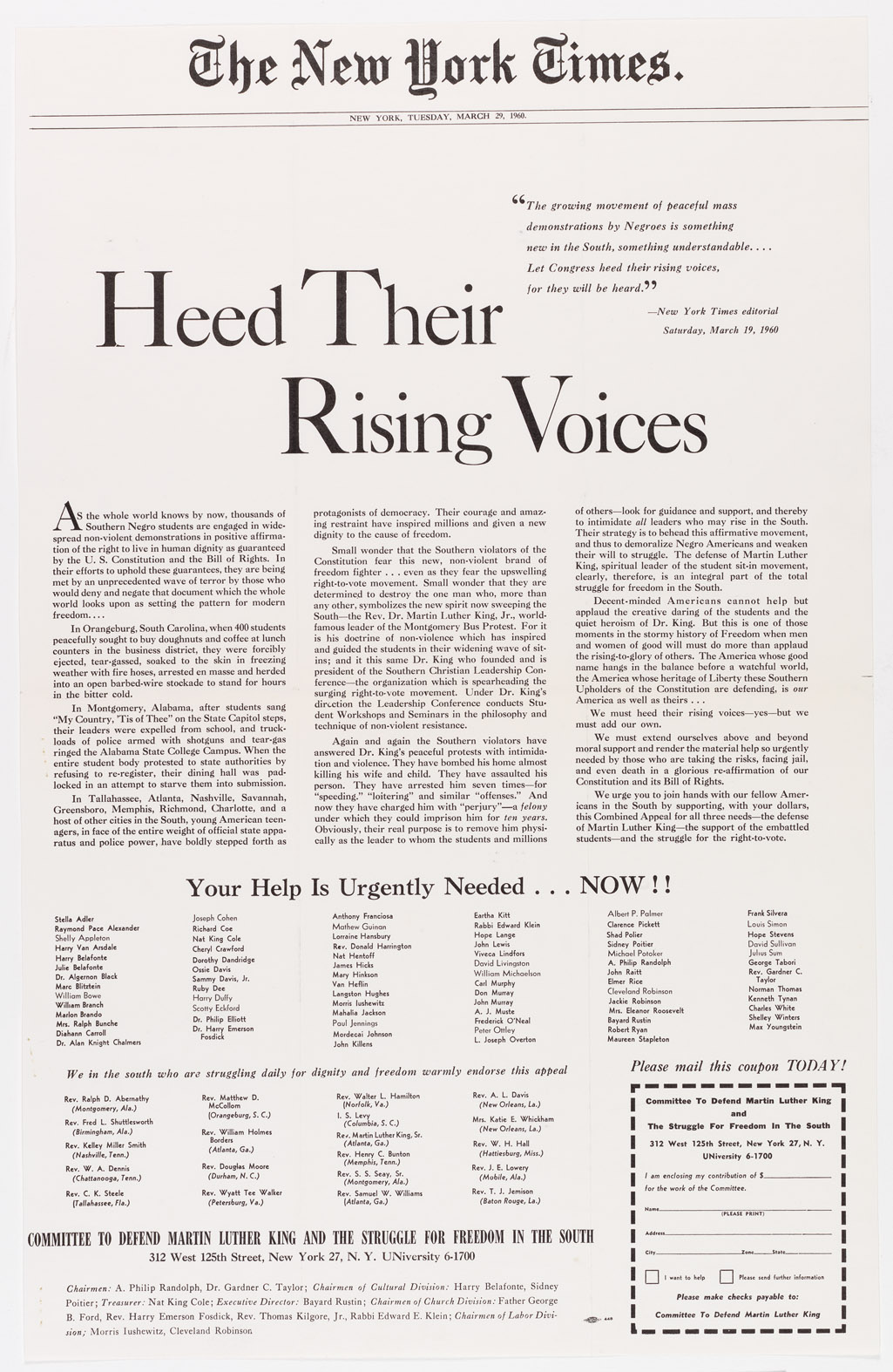
The Times was sued over "Heed Their Rising Voices"

On March 29, 1960, "Heed Their Rising Voices", an advertisement placed by the Committee to Defend Martin Luther King and the Struggle for Freedom in the South, appeared on page twenty-five of The New York Times. The advertisement described the civil rights movement among black students, including an "unprecedented wave of terror" that police forces met protesters with. The advertisement spoke out against the actions taken by Montgomery Police Department in Montgomery, Alabama; a number of the advertisement's assertions were proven false. Montgomery Public Safety commissioner L. B. Sullivan, despite not being named in the advertisement, sued the Times for defamation seeking US$500,000 (equivalent to US$5.44 million in 2025) in damages. Alabama courts and the Supreme Court of Alabama sided with Sullivan before the case was taken to the Supreme Court. In New York Times Co. v. Sullivan, the Court unanimously ruled in a landmark decision that newspapers cannot be held liable for defamatory statements unless made with actual malice.

== 1966–1971: Changing landscape and additional papers ==
A shift in the New York newspaper landscape in 1966 significantly benefited The New York Times. In April 1966, three failing publications—the New York Herald Tribune, the New York Journal-American, and the New York World-Telegram—agreed to merge to form the New York World Journal Tribune. Union workers went on strike against the New York World Journal Tribune from April to September 1966, delaying the paper's debut until the end of the strike; the World Journal Tribune would shut down in May 1967. As The New York Times's circulation numbers increased to 875,000 in 1966—an increase of 100,000 from the previous year—and 900,000 following the New York World Journal Tribune's closure, Sulzberger increased the paper's advertising rates. The increased rates drew criticism from advertising director Monroe Green; Green would retire at the end of 1967, allowing Sulzberger to consolidate the advertising, production, and circulation departments under Andrew Fisher.

In 1967, the international edition was discontinued, faced with an annual loss of US$1.5 million (equivalent to US$14.48 million in 2025) and decreasing circulation against the Paris Herald Tribune, which had recently entered a partnership with The Washington Post. Sulzberger purchased a stake in the Paris Herald Tribune, forming the International Herald Tribune. The World Journal Tribune's collapse left New York with one remaining afternoon paper, the New York Post. Sulzberger considered a second afternoon paper that would break from the Times's traditional prose, appearing more in form as the New York Herald Tribune. Several names were considered, including The Evening Times and The Metropolitan, before New York Today was chosen, later the New York Forum. Rosenthal was named the editor of the Forum. The pages were set in type in August 1967 and locked. Three employees—Rosenthal, James L. Greenfield, Stephen A. O. Golden—were authorized to be there that morning. A stringer, Jim Connolly, repeatedly grilled the men on what the paper would look like before being asked to leave by a security guard. Two hundred copies were printed in total; forty-five copies were sent to news executives before being recalled, while the remaining copies were locked in a safe in the corporate treasurer's office. Sulzberger ultimately did not print further issues of the New York Forum after several weeks.

Wicker's tenure as the Washington bureau chief was met by animosity from Catledge and Daniel. Greenfield, Rosenthal's protégé, embodied their efforts to replace the aloof and distant Wicker. Catledge, Daniel, Rosenthal, and Greenfield attempted to persuade Sulzberger into appointing Greenfield in February 1968; the men nearly succeeded, but Reston vehemently opposed the plan and stated that the staff of the Washington bureau would resign en masse. A visibly stressed Sulzberger informed Catledge that he would not go through with the plan and appointed Frankel instead. Upon learning of Sulzberger's intentions, Greenfield told Rosenthal, "Abe, don't ever ask me to come into this place again." Greenfield resigned on the spot and reportedly told Arthur Gelb that he "couldn't face cleaning out his desk", asking if Gelb would send him his favorite sweater and other items from his drawer. Greenfield returned to The New York Times in September 1969 as the paper's foreign editor under Rosenthal, who became managing editor.

== 1971–1972: The Pentagon Papers and New York Times Co. v. United States ==
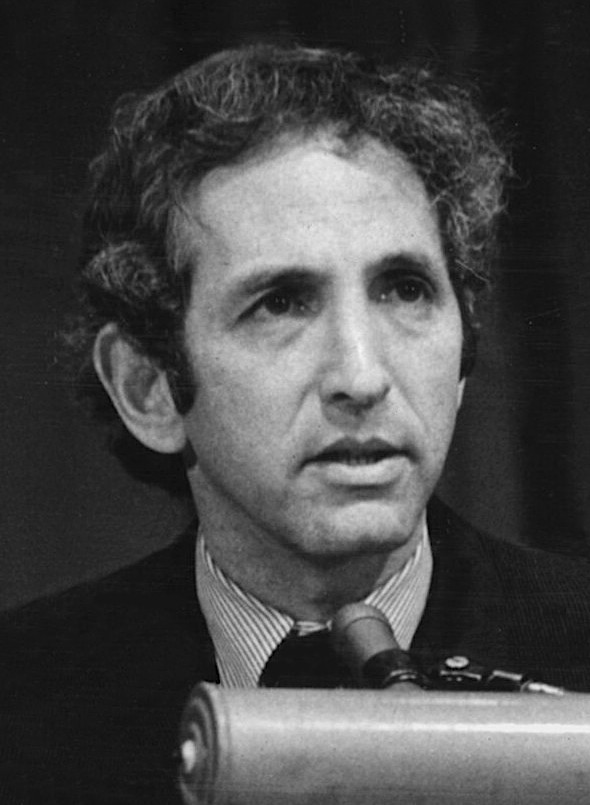
Daniel Ellsberg provided The New York Times with the Pentagon Papers.

Driven by a speech by Randy Kehler opposing the Vietnam War, RAND Corporation employee Daniel Ellsberg began photocopying pages of a Department of Defense report detailing the United States's involvement in the war, later known as the Pentagon Papers. Throughout 1970 and 1971, Ellsberg attempted to approach prominent politicians that could disseminate the Pentagon Papers, including the foremost congressional opponent of the Vietnam War, George McGovern, in January 1971, and wrote a letter to The New York Times in November 1970 describing the war as "immoral, illegal, and unconstitutional". McGovern told Ellsberg that he should go to the Times; reluctantly, he called reported Neil Sheehan in February. In March 1971, reporter Neil Sheehan met with Ellsberg and agreed to publicize the papers if The New York Times agreed to protect Ellsberg's identity.

Several weeks later, Sheehan and his wife Susan, a writer for The New Yorker, checked into a hotel in Cambridge, Massachusetts under a fictitious name to copy the papers. When the Sheehans arrived in Cambridge, Ellsberg informed Sheehan that he could only read—not copy—the Pentagon Papers, because they would then be property of The New York Times. In Secrets: A Memoir of Vietnam and the Pentagon Papers (2002), Ellsberg stated that he was concerned that the Times would not publish the documents in full and that the Federal Bureau of Investigation could become aware of the papers. To Sheehan, Ellsberg's concerns were "about going to jail" and his cavalierness towards exposing the documents to members of Congress. After confiding to his wife, who told him to "Xerox it", Sheehan believed that Ellsberg was too dangerous and began photocopying the documents at multiple copy shops in Boston after he had left on vacation.

The New York Times faced a race to publish the documents once they were photocopied. Greenfield stored the documents in his Manhattan apartment before they were moved to a suite at the New York Hilton Midtown. Sheehan and Allan M. Siegal primarily worked on sifting through the documents, meticulously citing each statement; other reporters joined in, including Hedrick Smith, E. W. Kenworthy, and Fox Butterfield. Despite the Times's legal counsel Lord Day & Lord advising against publishing the papers, nearly informing the Department of Justice, the Pentagon Papers appeared on the front page of The New York Times on June 13, 1971, though it was placed beside an article on the wedding of then-president Richard Nixon's daughter Tricia Nixon Cox, the New York City budget, and India–Pakistan relations.

The Times must respectfully decline the request of the attorney general, believing that it is in the interest of the people of this country to be informed of the material contained in this series of articles.

— The New York Times, June 15, 1971

The following day, The New York Times received a telex from then-attorney general John N. Mitchell telling the publication to halt its publication of the Pentagon Papers and to return the documents to the Department of Defense. After the Times stated its intention to continue publishing the papers, the Department of Justice sought a restraining order against the seven reporters and editors involved and the fifteen executives listed on the masthead. New York Times Co. v. United States moved quickly to the Supreme Court; oral arguments by The New York Times's legal defense, led by Alexander Bickel, were heard on June 26. In a 6-to-3 decision, the Supreme Court ruled in a landmark decision that the Times and The Washington Post, who began publishing the Pentagon Papers on June 18 after Ben Bagdikian persuaded the publication, could publish the Pentagon Papers. Notably, The New York Times the following day did not contain images on the front page.

In May 1972, the National Committee for Impeachment paid The New York Times US$17,850 (equivalent to $137,000 in 2025) for a two-page advertisement urging the House of Representatives to impeach Nixon for the war. Times pressmen derided the advertisement; New York Printing Pressmen's Union chairman Richard Siemers called the advertisement "traitorous" and "detrimental to the boys in Vietnam and prisoners of war". The pressmen demanded that the Times remove the advertisement and later asked for space in the paper to express their opinion to no avail. Nixon was pleased with the pressmen and sent an emissary to convey his thanks, charging the committee with violating the Federal Election Campaign Act. Nixon-appointed judge James L. Oakes sided with the committee in October.

== 1972–1977: Watergate scandal and Central Intelligence Agency investigations ==
The Watergate Office Building was broken into in June 1972.

On June 17, 1972, the Watergate Office Building, the Democratic National Committee's headquarters, was broken into. Unbeknownst to the general public, the intrusion was performed by five individuals—Virgilio Gonzalez, Bernard Barker, James McCord, Eugenio Martínez, and Frank Sturgis—who were paid by Nixon's fundraising organization Committee for the Re-Election of the President. The Washington Post—a political paper—placed its article on the event on the front page, unlike The New York Times, who sought to be cautious. Tad Szulc, who was familiar with some of the individuals from their involvement in the Bay of Pigs invasion, was eager to cover the story but could not connect the Cubans to the Central Intelligence Agency and his source was concerned that the Nixon administration was monitoring journalists's phone calls, particularly after the publication of the Pentagon Papers. The Washington Post covered the Watergate incident extensively, primarily the work of Bob Woodward and Carl Bernstein. Woodward was provided with information from Federal Bureau of Investigation associate director Mark Felt under the pseudonym "Deep Throat".

The Washington Post's first major breakthrough occurred on August 1, when Woodward and Bernstein reported that a US$25,000 (equivalent to $192,000 in 2025) cashier's check to Nixon's re-election campaign was deposited in a bank account operated by Barker. The Post missed the first edition but reported the story on the second, averting the potential for The New York Times to report on it. According to former reporter Robert M. Smith, acting Federal Bureau of Investigation director L. Patrick Gray discussed details of the intrusion with Mitchell at a Washington, D.C. restaurant a month later. Smith informed an editor at the Times's Washington bureau, Robert H. Phelps, who took notes on the conversation; Smith left Washington the following day to attend Yale Law School. The bureau focused on the Republican National Convention in the days after the lunch and Phelps left on a monthslong trip to Alaska. Phelps later stated that he had "no idea" where the notes went.

The New York Times remained delayed to The Washington Post's reporting, including reporting on an October 10 article that stated that the Federal Bureau of Investigation established that the Watergate burglary was an act of political sabotage committed by the Nixon re-election campaign. The Times article did not cover the broad conclusions but rather the accusations against Donald Segretti, a political operative who was the only individual named in the Post's reporting. By 1973, The Washington Post cemented its lead in reporting the Watergate scandal through its trifecta of stories on the cashier's check, Mitchell's control of a secret fund to spy on Democrats, and the Federal Bureau of Investigation inquiry. As Congress gathered information, the Post eased its coverage, giving The New York Times an opportunity to enhance its own coverage. The Times's efforts were spearheaded by Seymour Hersh, who exclusively reported on Dwight Chapin's departure and the first link between the White House and the operation.

Woodward and Bernstein turned to The New York Times in April 1973, inviting Hersh to dinner on April 8. (Note: In an interview with Howard Simons, the managing editor of The Washington Post at the time, Woodward stated he and Bernstein had "a couple of dinners". Hersh only recalls one dinner.) Bernstein asked Hersh what the Times would read the following morning in jest; the following day's issue of The New York Times contained James W. McCord Jr.'s testimony that the Committee for the Re-Election of the President paid the conspirators off. In May, reporter John M. Crewdson discovered that the Federal Bureau of Investigation wiretapped the phones of The New York Times, The Washington Post, The Sunday Times, six members of the National Security Council, and three high-ranking Foreign Service officials. With Christopher Lydon, Crewdson obtained the Huston Plan and published details on it. During the Watergate scandal, the Times lost multiple editors who were displeased with the Post's exclusives, including Gene Roberts. The scandal resulted in an impeachment inquiry against Nixon and House Committee on the Judiciary hearings that culminated in his resignation on August 9, 1974, and Gerald Ford assuming the presidency.

The New York Times faced a push for inclusivity driven by second-wave feminism. In February 1972, the Women's Caucus of the Times was formed. The group sent Sulzberger a five-page letter in May detailing the paper's shortcomings in recruiting female employees. In 1974, Betsy Wade—a member of the caucus—sued The New York Times under the Civil Rights Act of 1964. Elizabeth Boylan et al. v. New York Times Co. (Note: Elizabeth Boylan is Wade's married name. Wade chose to use her married name to ensure she would appear first in the list of the six initial plaintiffs in the case.) would represent hundreds of women, from reporters to clerks. The lawsuit was settled in October 1978; A. M. Rosenthal later asserted that he would have had to testify against his employees. The Times was forced to pay US$350,000 (equivalent to $1,727,678.57 in 2025) and establish an affirmative action program. Concurrently, a movement developed to incorporate the alternative honorific Ms. for women. Protesters gathered outside 229 West 43rd Street to advocate for Ms. to be included in The New York Times Manual of Style and Usage. Though Sunday editor Max Frankel supported the idea, Sulzberger and Rosenthal did not.

Hersh remained skeptical of the Central Intelligence Agency following the Watergate scandal and he published several exposés into the agency. In October 1974, Hersh published an article on the Central Intelligence Agency's role in the 1973 Chilean coup d'état that deposed Salvador Allende. In December, he published an article revealing the existence of Operation CHAOS, a domestic espionage program that illegally surveilled over ten thousand citizens, aided by the National Security Agency. The Hersh charges were given legitimacy by James Jesus Angleton's dismissal, leading to the President's Commission on CIA Activities within the United States. Hersh intended to publish an article on Project Azorian, a Central Intelligence Agency project to recover the Soviet submarine K-129 using the Glomar Explorer, but neither Jim Phelan nor Wallace Turner could verify the story's veracity. The New York Times published its story after the Los Angeles Times had published theirs. By 1976, Rosenthal was convinced that the Central Intelligence Agency was still involved in the Times's operations and urged the paper to sue under the Freedom of Information Act.

== 1977–1980: Financial difficulties and newspaper strike ==
Visions of vegetables dance in his sleepless head, along with recipes for pork chops liégeoise, treatises on termite detection, shopping guides to $44 canvas bags and $1,850 'Love' pendants from Tiffany.

— Time, August 15, 1977

The exodus of readers to suburban newspapers in New York City—such as Newsday in Long Island and Gannett newspapers in Westchester County—contributed to The New York Times's decline during the 1970s. Circulation decreased from 940,000 in 1969 to 796,000 in 1976 according to figures from the Audit Bureau of Circulations and advertising lines decreased eight million from 1970 to 1975. Rosenthal identified the relative success of New York as a publication that specialized in service journalism. Rosenthal, an editor vehemently opposed on perceived attempts to compromise on the Times's news operations, balked at attempts from executives to add a food coverage section to The New York Times in 1974; his opposition subsided when Sulzberger began ordering cuts to newsroom spending. In June 1976, Rosenthal wrote a proposal to introduce additional sections to the Times, attempting to garner new audiences.

A weekend section to The New York Times debuted in April 1976, followed by a home and sports section and culminating in a science section in November 1978. The additional sections were poorly received; Time devoted a cover story to critiquing the sections and New York wrote that the Times was soiling its reputation in an image of "middle-class self-absorption" amid "New York's crumbling cityscape". Despite negative reception, the sections reversed The New York Times's declining circulation. In May 1977, the Times sold more advertising lines than it had at any point in the paper's history. The home section, which began in March 1977, was led by architecture critic Ada Louise Huxtable for several issues before Paul Goldberger took the reins. The sections marked a lighter tone for The New York Times and featured articles from writers Lois Gould and William Zinsser, the latter of whom wrote a jovial article on the New Haven jogging phenomenon.

In response to work rulings initiated by The New York Times, the New York Post, and the Daily News that drastically reduced manning requirements, pressmen began a trilateral strike against the papers on August 10, 1978, later joined by other unions. The strike saw the emergence of newspapers established to capitalize on the landscape, including The City News, The New York Daily Press, The New York Daily Metro, and The Graphic. Not The New York Times was published in September by a group of Times editors, including Christopher Cerf and George Plimpton. During the strike, The New York Times missed the short-lived papacy of Pope John Paul I. Not The New York Times chronicled the papacy of Pope John Paul John Paul I, whose name is an amalgamation of John Paul I, John Lennon, and Paul McCartney, lasting nineteen minutes. Not The New York Times had included the factual detail that his successor would not be Italian; Pope John Paul II, who succeeded John Paul I, was Polish. The strike ended on November 5, though the New York Post resumed publication a month earlier after owner Rupert Murdoch signed a contract with the pressmen.

== 1980–1986: Coverage of the AIDS epidemic and increasing circulation ==
Under Rosenthal, The New York Times's coverage of the beginning of the AIDS epidemic was muted. In November 1980, a gunman armed with an Uzi submachine gun fired into the Ramrod, a leather bar in the gay liberation epicenter of Greenwich Village, killing two people and injuring six. The Times reserved its coverage in the metropolitan section and did not run a front-page story on AIDS until May 1983, when assistant secretary for health Edward Brandt Jr. described the epidemic as a priority for the Public Health Service; San Francisco Chronicle reporter Randy Shilts later told Fresh Air's Terry Gross that a synagogue bombing in Paris that had occurred one month prior was featured prominently on the front page. The National Gay Task Force wrote to Sulzberger to urge The New York Times to increase its coverage of the AIDS epidemic, and the Gay Men's Health Crisis noted that the Times did not run a story for a gathering it hosted in Madison Square Garden that attracted tens of thousands of people. The AIDS epidemic presented a challenge to the otherwise puritan Times, which abstained from lurid, subterranean descriptions of gay venues that attracted attention from inspectors, unlike the New York Post and the Daily News. By contrast, Frankel deliberately highlighted grotesque activities—such as anal intercourse—in his editorials.

In 1982, circulation numbers were estimated to be 929,000. In October 1985, The New York Times would reach one million daily papers, a record it would hold until September 1986. Concurrently, Sulzberger began considering a Times without Rosenthal. In March 1983, he told Sydney Gruson that there would be a new publisher and executive editor. Rosenthal promoted several editors—Craig R. Whitney, Warren Hoge, and John Vinocur—in an effort to prove his testament to the editors that would succeed him. An epidemic would affect The New York Times when twenty-nine employees working at 229 West 43rd Street came down with a pneumonia-like disease in June 1985. New York City Department of Health epidemiologists surveyed the building and commissioner David Sencer made an assessment in July determining that the employees were infected with Legionnaires' disease. Medical director Howard R. Brown informed the Times that Legionella pneumophila could have made its way through the ventilation system; The New York Times then changed all of its fan-room filters.

Through opinionated phrases and unattributed characterizations, the article established a tone that cast its subject in an unfavorable light.

— The New York Times, August 7, 1985

The New York Times published a profile of U.S. News & World Report publisher and real estate developer Mortimer Zuckerman in August 1985 as Zuckerman and Rosenthal entered the same social standing. The article claimed that Zuckerman "conquered New York's real-estate world", particularly following his successful bid to develop the New York Coliseum property on Columbus Circle. On the morning of the story's publication, Zuckerman called Rosenthal to enumerate its errors. The Times published an editors' note two days later. The note surprised several editors in the newsroom, including the profile's author, Jane Perlez. Former The Atlantic Monthly editor Robert Manning asked if Zuckerman "cast a spell" on him, and journalist Murray Kempton called the note a "genuine rudeness to Perlez" in his Newsday column. Rosenthal disregarded the criticism and rejected being persuaded to write the note. A month later, The Village Voice ran a cover story with an illustration by Edward Sorel depicting Rosenthal's head as a tank turret, decapitating Sydney Schanberg, who was removed from the opinion pages by Sulzberger on Rosenthal's request.

Rosenthal didn't have a nervous breakdown, but he was close to it.

— Arthur Ochs Sulzberger, 1999

Sulzberger expedited Rosenthal's retirement to prevent his son, Arthur Ochs Sulzberger Jr., from having to remove Rosenthal himself. Rosenthal felt that the younger Sulzberger had contempt for the institution after he appeared in socks, scolding him after he appeared in Rosenthal's office. Sulzberger assumed that Rosenthal's publicized personal life—chronicling his relationships with actress Katharine Balfour, one of his secretaries, and newspaper editor Shirley Lord—was contributing to his erratic management. Rosenthal's behavior in the office concerned other employees; Harrison Salisbury compared Rosenthal to Oedipus, who is said to have gouged out his own eyes in Oedipus Rex after realizing he had committed patricide and incest. Sulzberger later told Alex S. Jones and Susan Tifft for The Trust (1999) that Rosenthal was close to a nervous breakdown. Despite concerns, Rosenthal continued to serve through his editorship, redesigning the Metropolitan Report and dispatching Maureen Dowd to Washington.

The alternate honorific Ms. became an apparent issue by April 1986. Assistant managing editor Craig Whitney informed Sulzberger in September 1985 that, at a meeting with reporters and editors, the honorific was vehemently inquired about. Feminist journalist Paula Kassell purchased ten shares of The New York Times Company to gain access to a shareholders meeting. In April 1986, she challenged Sulzberger to convene a panel of language experts to come to a decision. Kassell was informed that the debate would not need to take place because The New York Times had begun to adopt the new style. Editors of Ms. walked into the Times's offices to give a basket of flowers for Rosenthal. The policy was officially changed in June. Simultaneously, Sulzberger attempted to persuade Rosenthal to retire, inviting him to an Italian restaurant that month and offering him an opinion column. In September, Rosenthal informed his son and Associated Press reporter Andrew that Max Frankel would succeed him and Arthur Gelb would become managing editor. Rosenthal officially resigned on October 11, 1986.

== 1986–1992: Newsroom changes and Sulzberger's resignation ==
Frankel's tenure as executive editor was highlighted by characteristic and ideologic change from his predecessor. Frankel complimented editors whom he felt had written great articles and bantered with employees. He focused on covering the AIDS epidemic with greater fervor, assigning several employees to the task, but remained wary. The prohibition on using the word "gay" was not lifted until July 1987. Frankel viewed The New York Times's volumetric prose unfavorably compared to newspapers such as USA Today, whose articles were significantly shorter. An amateur painter, he focused on the design of the Times and believed that stories should be able to be read in full on the front page, much to the displeasure of Sulzberger's wife Carol. Despite defining himself antithetically to Rosenthal, Frankel would take an aggressive approach to the front page, later describing his position as "authoritarian and dictatorial". Rosenthal requested that Frankel appoint John Vinocur as managing editor and hire Andrew. Frankel rejected promoting Vinocur as he was not familiar with him—Vinocur would go on to run the International Herald Tribune; he had worked with Andrew before at the Associated Press and hired him.

Several editors positioned themselves to replace outgoing Washington bureau chief Bill Kovach, who was appointed in 1979 in an effort to decrease the bureau's autonomy. Frankel's accession furthered the disdain Kovach had for him; Frankel did not place Kovach's name on the masthead. Kovach resigned in 1986 to work for The Atlanta Journal-Constitution. The need for a bureau chief increased amid the Iran–Contra affair, a political scandal that was the largest political story since the attempted assassination of Ronald Reagan. Deputy Washington editor Howell Raines was rejected for his weak foreign policy and his "tendency to not think conceptually". Frankel rejected former London bureau chief R. W. Apple Jr. after harshly reviewing his London chiefship and national editor Dave Jones out of fear that he would "coddle and shelter" the bureau's staff rather than challenging them. Whitney was ultimately selected despite lacking experience in Washington. To that end, he selected Apple and Paris correspondent Judith Miller as deputy editors. The idea of hiring Miller came from the younger Sulzberger.

Frankel sought to advance The New York Times's Washington coverage against The Washington Post. To wit, he delegated determining which stories the late-night staff should match to the Washington bureau rather than the night editors in New York; the Washington Bureau received a copy of The Washington Post at 11 p.m. The Times achieved initial success with Whitney, whose coverage of the Iran–Contra affair and George H. W. Bush and Bob Dole's jostling for the Republican presidential nomination earned praise. The paper's successes would diminish after then-senator Gary Hart dropped out of the Democratic presidential primaries amid a report from the Miami Herald alleging that he engaged in an extramarital affair with Donna Rice Hughes. Within the week, Whitney sent thirteen letters to presidential candidates demanding their biographical, sexual, professional, and personal information. The perceived invasion of privacy was denounced by columnists Anthony Lewis and Rosenthal. Chicago Tribune columnist Mike Royko telephoned the Times's public relations office to ask for the marital histories of Sulzberger and the editors. Frankel was displeased with Miller's performance, describing her as " dismissive, mistrustful, and disrespectful" in a letter to Whitney.

My view of this bureau before I got here was that it was fat and lazy—a few terrific seasoned reporters, a few terrific but unseasoned Washington reporters, and a whole room full of just average ones.

— Craig Whitney, 1987

In July 1987, The New York Times issued a correction for an account of testimony it published several days prior. The erroneous article, written by Fox Butterfield, reported that National Security Council lieutenant colonel Oliver North testified to the congressional committees investigating the Iran–Contra affair that Central Intelligence Agency director William J. Casey intended to create a fund to facilitate the sale of arms to Iran. Before its publication, Butterfield's article was read by Joseph Lelyveld, who raised suspicions over the lack of a direct quote from North; Washington bureau reporters could not produce a quote after the story was published. Despite facing no resistance from other editors, Frankel realized that the story was incorrect after speaking with Lelyveld and issued a prominent and unprecedented correction on the front page. The Washington bureau faced further troubles when Whitney, who was displeased with the Washington bureau, formed a list of correspondents he felt did not have journalistic flair or who rarely broke stories and reassigned five to New York. The reassignments caused an uproar in the bureau. Congressional correspondent Martin Tolchin likened it to the Saturday Night Massacre and forty-one employees signed a letter in disagreement. The Washington Post learned of the discontent, much to Frankel's chagrin. Whitney later described the incident as the "biggest mistake" he had ever made.

In November 1988, displeased with Whitney's performance, Frankel appointed London bureau chief Raines as Washington bureau chief and Whitney as London bureau chief. Unsentimental and aggressive, Raines sought to resuscitate a bureau that foundered under Whitney. Several days after becoming bureau chief, Raines had a speaker Miller used to telephone into news meetings without attending them in person removed, eventually moving her to the New York media desk. Raines formed a list of reporters who would receive better stories, exasperating journalists who were not on the list. Raines's style attracted attention from publications such as Spy, who particularly noted his eccentricities, such as installing a hotline in the clerks's desk specifically for his use. In July 1989, Lelyveld was made deputy managing editor. Bernard Gwertzman—whom Lelyveld had wanted to serve as his deputy—was appointed foreign editor. Gwertzman would run the foreign desk during the Revolutions of 1989 and the dissolution of the Soviet Union, the end of the Cold War, the Gulf War, negotiations to end apartheid in South Africa, the Oslo Accords, and the Yugoslav Wars, in what Lelyveld described as the "greatest run of foreign news since World War II".

By 1987, Sulzberger had demonstrated a waning interest in The New York Times, becoming chairman of the Metropolitan Museum of Art that year. Frankel spoke to Sulzberger Jr. rather than his father when discussing budgetary cuts following Black Monday. In April 1988, Sulzberger appointed his son as deputy publisher from assistant publisher. Sulzberger Jr. was juxtaposed to the social and cultural beliefs held by his father; though he bantered with employees and invited them to his Central Park West apartment upon arriving in New York in 1986, Sulzberger Jr. did not express the same outwardness upon being made assistant publisher, believing that a publisher should not befriend his employees. Likewise, he did not involve himself in the civic fabric of New York. Sulzberger's involvement with wealthy New Yorkers became an issue when Walter Annenberg deliberated donating his US$1 billion (equivalent to US$2.36 billion in 2025) collection of Impressionist artworks to the Metropolitan Museum of Art in 1991, but disapproved of the Times's mention of his father Moses's tax evasion charges when referencing his name. After Sulzberger expressed that the mentions of his father were gratuitous to Lelyveld, Annenberg asked that Michael Kimmelman's review would be "devoid of zingers". On January 16, 1992, Sulzberger resigned.

== 1992–1994: Third Sulzberger era and the Internet ==
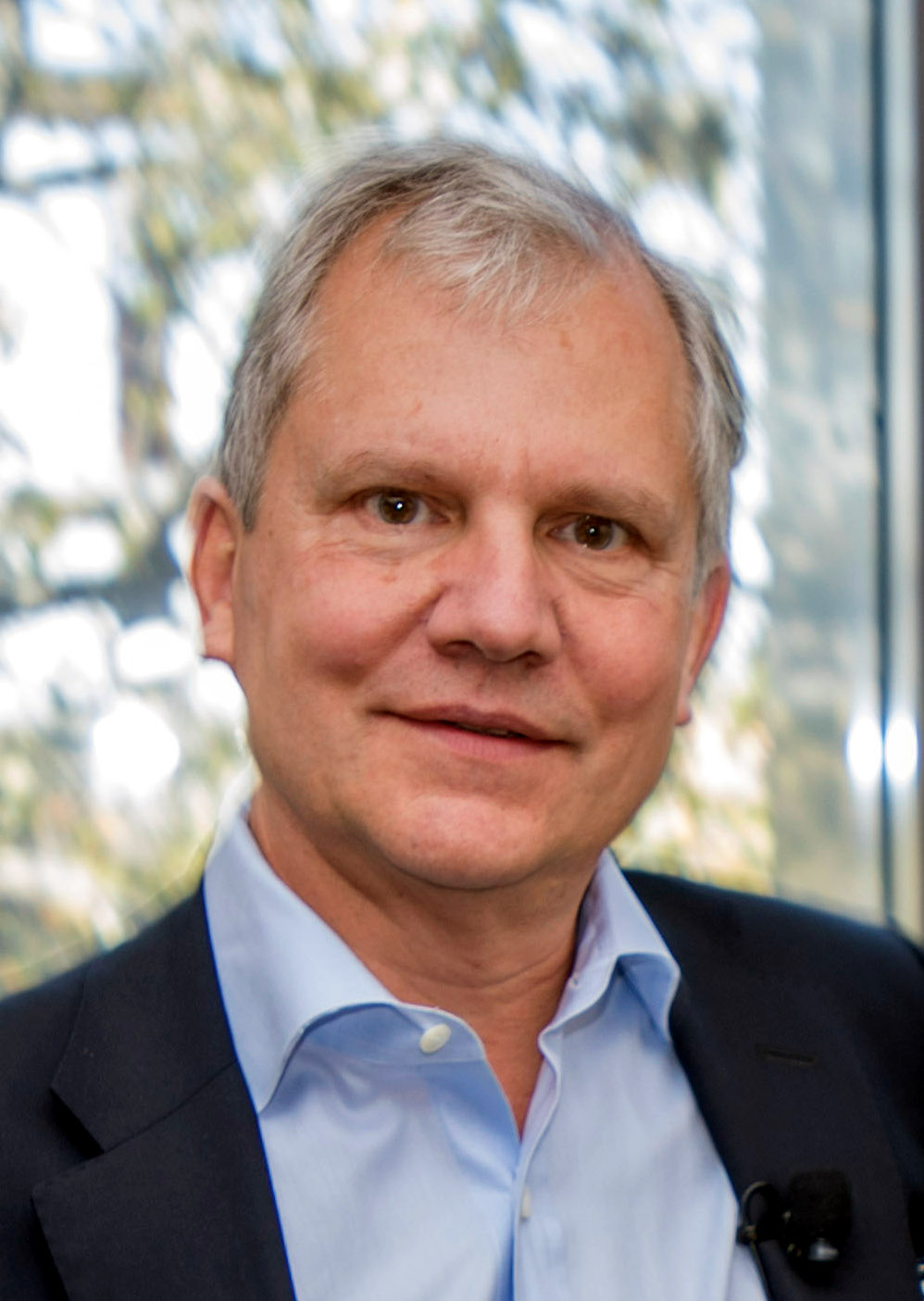
Arthur Ochs Sulzberger Jr. became the publisher of The New York Times in 1992.

In September 1992, Sulzberger Jr. announced that he would shift the posts of three editors, Jack Rosenthal, Hoge, and Raines. Rosenthal replaced Hoge as editor of The New York Times Magazine while Raines became editorial page editor. Rosenthal would later be made assistant managing editor as part of the arraignment. Raines would continue directing coverage of the 1992 presidential election until November, and he would take control in January 1993. Raines identified with Harry S. Truman's political philosophy of appointing one-sided economists and felt that the editorial board should reflect objectivity, ending Rosenthal's prohibition on the words "must" or "should". Sulzberger Jr. and Raines believed in environmental causes and saw a use for the board in carrying their beliefs; Robert B. Semple Jr. was empowered to write an opinion piece against the opening of a gold mine near Yellowstone National Park. Raines attracted criticism for his oft-acidic opinion pieces, in which he branded Senate Republican leader Dole as a "churlish partisan", resulting in his denouncement on the Senate floor. The New Yorker notably questioned Raines's negative perception of then-president Bill Clinton, a Democrat, and The New York Observer chastened him in an article. Despite support from Sulzberger Jr., the editorial page drew critique from Frankel—who said it was "too often shrill"—and Lelyveld—who found its language and tone excessive.

The Internet represented a generational shift within the self-certitude The New York Times. Among the Internet's most prominent skeptics from within the Times was Sulzberger, who negotiated The New York Times Company's US$1.1 billion (equivalent to US$2.45 billion in 2025) acquisition of The Boston Globe in 1993. Sulzberger reaffirmed his support for print media in a speech at the Midwest Research Institute in May 1994, comparing the Internet to the unkempt highways in India. The dichotomic Sulzberger Jr. unequivocally disagreed with his father, speaking to employees of The New York Times in February of that year to defiantly state that the paper must pursue digital endeavors. In June 1994, @times appeared on America Online's website as an extension of the Times. @times featured news articles, film reviews, sports news, and business articles. Articles were retained for twenty-four hours as a result of a deal signed by The New York Times Company in 1983 giving Mead Data Central, the parent company of LexisNexis, electronic rights to The New York Times's content. In December 1994, the Mead Corporation sold Mead Data Central to Reed Elsevier, giving the Times digital rights to its content. In its first week, @times's message board had over two thousand postings, but criticism over the service's lack of convivality grew, particularly in comparison to Time's online offerings.

Frankel intended to retire in 1994, exacerbated by the impending customary age at which he should retire, his wife Joyce Purnick's breast cancer diagnosis. In June 1993, Frankel told The New Yorker that he was overworked and overburdened. In his tenure, The New York Times was criticized for naming the woman who accused William Kennedy Smith of rape in 1991, an incident that drew righteous indignation from tabloids, faced dissenting opinions from within the Washington bureau, and issued a front-page correction. On April 7, 1994, Frankel resigned. Sulzberger Jr. named Lelyveld as his replacement. In one of his final decisions, Frankel promoted metropolitan editor Gerald M. Boyd to assistant managing editor in September 1993 and placed his name first on the masthead, putting Boyd in contention to replace him. The appointment created a rift between Lelyveld and Boyd, the former of whom felt he was not qualified enough. Lelyveld had instructed Boyd on how the lede story for the 1993 World Trade Center bombing should be written; Boyd dismissed him, giving Lelyveld admiration for Boyd. Lelyveld did not have an affection for any particular editor to serve as his managing editor, particularly Boyd, but selected Gene Roberts, the aging executive editor of The Philadelphia Inquirer who let Lelyveld report on the Chappaquiddick incident in 1969.

== 1994–1998: The New York Times Electronic Media Company and changing landscape ==
By 1994, several employees of The New York Times had begun to access the Internet through Internet service providers such as Panix and the Pipeline, the latter of which was created by The New York Times Magazine alumnus James Gleick. Technology reporter John Markoff, who notably covered the pursuit of computer hacker Kevin Mitnick, established an email address under the domain name nyt.com in 1990. Markoff moved the address to Internex, an Internet service provider in Menlo Park, California, in 1994. The email was compromised by Mitnick, who erroneously believed that Markoff was attempting to track him down; in actuality, physicist Tsutomu Shimomura had assisted the Federal Bureau of Investigation (FBI) with locating Mitnick at the time and he was arrested weeks later. In July 1994, internet services manager Gordon Thompson sent the first email communiqué to the nytimes.com address from his Panix account. In November, senior information and technology editor Richard J. Meislin created a web page on an internal server to list resources for Times editors known as Navigator, later made public. It remained regularly updated until February 2007 and sporadically updated until 2014.

Convinced of the capabilities of the Internet by a dinner he had with Meislin and Thompson, (Note: Meislin claimed that he typed Lelyveld's name into a web browser during the dinner while eating rabbit, factual details that Lelyveld could not recall.) Lelyveld assembled four employees—news desk editor Kevin McKenna, special projects executive editor William Stockton, advertising executive Daniel Donaghy, and information systems employee Steve Luciani—to develop a website for The New York Times at Sulzberger Jr.'s request. Changing media dynamics introduced a sense of urgency to the team; organizations that traditionally co-existed with the Times—such as America Online, Yahoo, and CNN—succeeded digitally. The expansion of websites such as Monster.com and Craigslist threatened The New York Times's classified advertisement sales, which accounted for US$300 million (equivalent to US$615.85 million in 2025) in revenue in 1996. In June 1995, The New York Times Company appointed businessman Martin Nisenholtz president of its digital media subsidiary. Nisenholtz reported directly to Lelyveld and general manager Russ Lewis, an unusual arraignment for a Times executive. Gwertzman was assigned to direct the editorial operations of the website. The team chose the domain name nytimes.com, believing that Markoff's nyt.com would be confused for the New York Telephone.

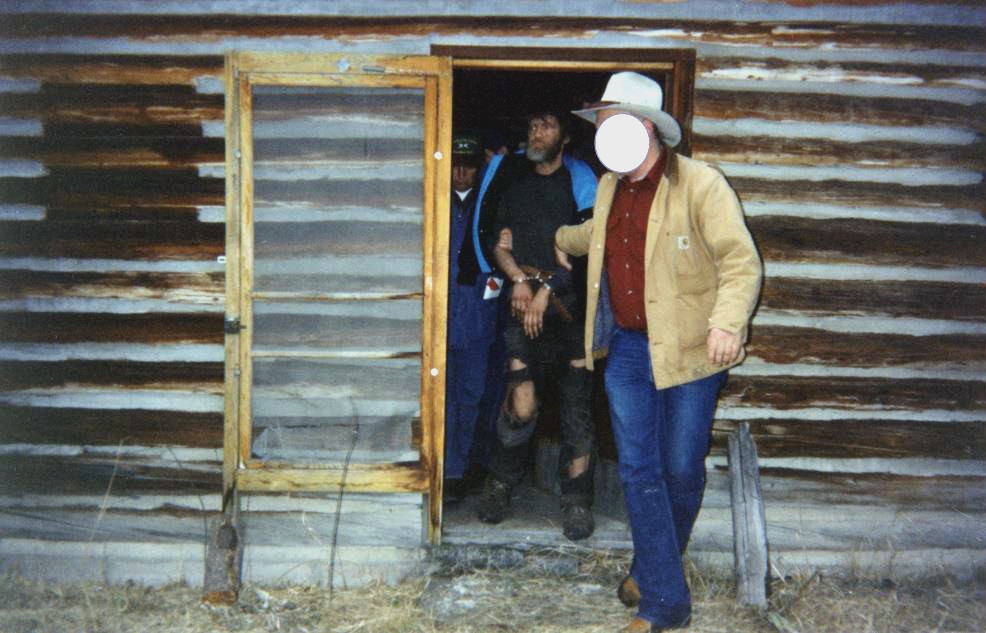
The New York Times's publication of Industrial Society and Its Future (1995) led to the arrest of domestic terrorist Ted Kaczynski.

In June 1995, two packages arrived at the mailrooms of The New York Times and The Washington Post addressed to then-deputy managing editor Warren Hoge and then-deputy managing editor Michael Getler respectively. The packages contained a copy of Industrial Society and Its Future (1995), a Luddite essay. The manifesto was written by Ted Kaczynski, a domestic terrorist known as the "Unabomber" who mailed and planted sixteen mail bombs between 1978 and 1995, killing three people and injuring twenty-three others. The packages contained a note stating that he—addressed as "FC" for "Freedom Club"—would "desist from terrorism" if the publications published Industrial Society and Its Future. The Washington Post publisher Donald E. Graham and executive editor Leonard Downie Jr. met with Sulzberger Jr. and Lelyveld to coordinate their response. Joined by Post president Boisfeuillet Jones Jr., the men met with FBI director Louis Freeh and attorney general Janet Reno. Freeh and Reno suggested that the publications publish the manifesto as a pamphlet or book, an idea the men rejected for its difficulty. Kaczynski's essay appeared on September 19. (Note: Only The Washington Post published Industrial Society and Its Future as an insert as The New York Times did not have the mechanical capacity to publish it.) Critics, such as the American Journalism Review, objected to giving into such demands in fear of creating a copycat effect, though The Washington Post reported that most readers from outside of the Washington, D.C. area requested reprints and souvenir copies. Sulzberger Jr. defended the publication of Kaczynski's essay citing the credibility of his threat given his experience. Kaczynski's brother David recognized the penmanship of the essay in the Times and reported his suspicions to the FBI; Kaczynski was arrested in April 1996.

On January 19, 1996, at exactly 11:59 p.m., nytimes.com was launched at the Hippodrome Building but formally announced on January 22 in order to give engineers the weekend to resolve any issues. Sulzberger Jr., Lelyveld, and Lewis sent a case of French champagne to the building. The website required users to register an account; according to Nisenholtz, this was done for company-wide and advertiser analytics purposes. Jim Romenesko, then-writer for the St. Paul Pioneer Press, was the first person to register an account on the site after attempting to access it for a month. In the initial hours following the website's official launch, one reader was recorded to have registered every second. By March 1997, one million people had registered an account in comparison to the 1.1 million weekday print subscribers and the 1.6 million print subscribers on Sundays. The website was rudimentary, consisting of four stories and minimal photographs and designs, though it contained an interactive crossword puzzle and a calculator for determining the income tax one would pay under tax reforms promised by Bob Dole, the Republican nominee in the 1996 presidential election. nytimes.com was free to access and did not implement a paywall for readers in the United States, though an international paywall of US$35 (equivalent to $72 in 2025) a month was put into effect until July 1997.
