= Ann M. Sperber =

American author (1935–1994)

Ann M. Sperber (born Aenne Sperber; June 20, 1935 – February 11, 1994) was an American author known for her biographies of Edward R. Murrow and Humphrey Bogart. A native of Vienna, Sperber graduated from Barnard College and was a Fulbright Scholar in Germany. Her biography of Murrow was a finalist for the Pulitzer Prize for Biography or Autobiography in 1987. The Ann M. Sperber Prize is an annual award given by Fordham University that recognizes outstanding biographies of journalists.

== Early life ==
Sperber was born in Vienna to Manfred and Liselotte Sperber. Manfred Sperber, an Austrian citizen, met Liselotte in the German city of Mannheim. They had moved from Germany to Austria in 1933, shortly after Hitler's appointment as German chancellor. Manfred Sperber was trained in law, and he worked as an auditor for the DeFaKa group of department stores until the Jewish Boycott. Thereafter, he served as an accountant for the Jewish community in Vienna. Aenne Sperber was born there on June 20, 1935.

Liselotte and Aenne Sperber attempted to sail to Cuba in May 1939, but they were held in France for several months when Cuba refused entry to their ship. They were granted American visas that October, and Aenne took the name Ann when she and her mother arrived in the United States. Manfred Sperber joined them in the U.S. in 1940.

After graduating from Barnard College in 1956, Sperber was a Fulbright Scholar in Germany. While she was there, she conducted the beginnings of her research on Edward R. Murrow. She then worked as children's book editor for Putnam and McGraw-Hill.

== Writing ==
Thirty years after her stint in Germany, Sperber finished a biography of Murrow entitled Murrow: His Life and Times. "If an author's effort could produce a good biography, Murrow would be a masterpiece," wrote Walter Goodman in The New York Times. "A. M. Sperber seems to have read everything by and about the widely admired radio-television journalist Edward R. Murrow, who died in 1965, and to have talked with everybody who knew him. Unfortunately, her devotion overwhelms her discrimination... There is much interesting material here from an eventful life, but it is submerged in a welter of anecdotes, quotes and excerpts, many of them tangential or repetitious. Despite the criticism, the book was one of four finalists for the Pulitzer Prize for Biography or Autobiography in 1987.

Sperber spent several years researching the life of Humphrey Bogart, conducting 150 interviews and examining the Warner Bros. archives at the University of Southern California. She died on February 11, 1994; she was thought to have suffered a heart attack. After Sperber's death, Lax formed Sperber's research into a complete narrative, and Bogart was published in 1997. The two co-authors never met each other. Writing for the Los Angeles Times, film critic David Thomson said that Sperber and Lax "have written a book that sets standards for research and evidence in the life of an actor."

== Sperber Prize ==
Liselotte Sperber, who lived to be 103 years old, established the Ann M. Sperber Prize at Fordham University in 1999. The award recognizes the best biographies of journalists. The award winners, their books, and the subjects of their books, are shown below. (Information is not available for 2004 and 2008.)

Year	Author	Title	Subject
1999	Henry Mayer	All on Fire: William Lloyd Garrison and the Abolition of American Slavery	William Lloyd Garrison
2000	Susan E. Tifft and Alex S. Jones	The Trust: The Private and Powerful Family Behind the New York Times	Adolph Ochs, Sulzberger family
2001	David Nasaw	The Chief: The Life of William Randolph Hearst	William Randolph Hearst
2002	Dennis McDougal	Privileged Son: Otis Chandler and the Rise and Fall of the L.A. Times Dynasty	Otis Chandler
2003	John F. Stacks	Scotty: James B. Reston and the Rise and Fall of American Journalism	James B. Reston
2005	Arthur Gelb	City Room	Arthur Gelb
2006	Victor Navasky	A Matter of Opinion	Victor Navasky
2007	Myra MacPherson	All Governments Lie! The Life and Times of Rebel Journalist I.F. Stone	I.F. Stone
2009	Todd DePastino	Bill Mauldin: A Life Up Front	Bill Mauldin
2010	D.D. Guttenplan	American Radical: The Life and Times of I.F. Stone	I.F. Stone
2011	Alan Brinkley	The Publisher: Henry Luce and His American Century	Henry Luce
2012	John Matteson	The Lives of Margaret Fuller: A Biography	Margaret Fuller
2013	Douglas Brinkley	Cronkite	Walter Cronkite
2014	Robert Miraldi	Seymour Hersh: Scoop Artist	Seymour Hersh
2015	Charles M. Blow	Fire Shut Up in My Bones: A Memoir	Charles M. Blow
2016	Thomas Kunkel	Man in Profile: Joseph Mitchell of The New Yorker	Joseph Mitchell
2017	Robert Gottlieb	Avid Reader: A Life	Robert Gottlieb
2018	Mitchell Stephens	The Voice of America: Lowell Thomas and the Invention of 20th-Century Journalism	Lowell Thomas
