= Charles Conley =

Charles Conley may refer to:

- Charles C. Conley (1934–1984), American mathematician
- Charles Swinger Conley (1921–2010), attorney, civil rights leader and judge
