= Charles Swinger Conley =

American civil rights attorney (1921–2010)

- Born: 7 December 1921; Montgomery, Alabama, US
- Died: 9 September 2010 (aged 88); Montgomery, Alabama, US

Alabama Legal Defense Committee, Montgomery, 1968-1980
- In office 1968–1980

Charles Swinger Conley (December 7, 1921 – September 9, 2010) was an American attorney, civil rights leader and Alabama's first Black judge of the Court of Common Pleas in Macon County. He served as attorney of record for Martin Luther King Jr., the Montgomery Improvement Association, the Southern Christian Leadership Conference and the Student Nonviolent Coordinating Committee.

== Early life and education ==
Born in Montgomery County in 1921, Conley attended private school, earning his bachelor's degree from Alabama State College following graduation from high school. He gained a history masters at University of Michigan and a jurisprudence degree from New York University Law School.

== Career ==
After Conley returned to Montgomery he worked on many civil rights cases including the desegregation of public libraries and New York Times Co. v. Sullivan, representing many notable people including Martin Luther King, Ralph Abernathy, Joseph Lowery, Solomon Snowden Seay and Fred Shuttlesworth. The New York Times Co. v. Sullivan case revolved around an appeal to raise funding called "Heed Their Rising Voices" by the Committee to Defend Martin Luther King and the Struggle for Freedom in the South, which appeared in the New York Times newspaper in 1960.

A protest starting on February 1, 1960, at the Alabama State College campus had been aggressively attended by Montgomery police, triggering the appeal. Following the New York Times call to action a libel suit was filed by police commissioner L. B. Sullivan. Attorneys Conley and Fred Gray represented accused students in local, state and federal courtrooms. The intervention resulted in restaurants and lunch-counters in 26 southern cities ending segregationist policies. Discrimination against African Americans continued in Montgomery but segregation had been effectively disputed allowing expansion of the movement to overturn racial injustice.

Conley was elected in 1972 as Alabama's first Black judge of the Court of Common Pleas (Macon County). This court system changed to that of a District Court, and Judge Conley was re-elected in 1976. Conley served as attorney of record for cases until 1992, when he officially retired.

== Legacy ==
Before Conley's death, he had made provisions for a $1.2 million donation to his Alma mater to create the Honorable Charles Swinger Conley Scholarship Fund within the AnBryce Program at the New York University School of Law.

== See also ==
- List of African-American jurists
