= Stephen Schlossberg =

Stephen Schlossberg (May 18, 1921 – December 10, 2011) was a union organizer who later became General Counsel of the United Auto Workers and served as Undersecretary for Labor-Management Relations under Secretary of Labor Bill Brock during the Reagan administration.

== Background ==
Stephen Isaac Schlossberg was born on May 18, 1921, in Roanoke, Virginia. His father was a Jewish emigrant from Russia. He graduated from high school in 1938. He started college at the University of Virginia, but dropped out to enlist in the U.S. Army the day after the Pearl Harbor attack in 1941. After World War II and a stint working in his family's retail business, he became an organizer for the International Ladies' Garment Workers' Union. He went back to college after four years' organizing work and got his undergraduate degree from Virginia in 1955, followed by a law degree in 1957.

After working in a labor law firm in Washington, D.C., he went to work for the Federal Mediation and Conciliation Service in 1961, and spent much time on the labor dispute that became the 1962–63 New York City newspaper strike.

He joined the United Auto Workers as counsel in 1963, and served as General Counsel until 1982, working under UAW Presidents Walter Reuther, Leonard Woodcock, and Douglas A. Fraser. By the early 1970s, he was also put in charge of the UAW's Washington office.

When named Undersecretary for Labor-Management Relations in 1985, he drew criticism from conservatives because of his union ties, although Secretary of Labor Brock saw Schlossberg as a good candidate for communicating with labor. His liberal/labor background was not hidden, however, as he hung photos for Woody Guthrie, Joe Hill, and George Meany in his office. In 1987, he left to become the Washington director of the United Nations' International Labour Organization.

Schlossberg died of congestive heart failure at his home in Sarasota, Florida on December 10, 2011.

== Personal ==
In June 1963, he married Nancy Kamin, with whom he had two children, a son and a daughter.
