= S.S. Seay =

Solomon Snowden Seay, Sr. (January 25, 1899 – 1988) was an American activist, religious leader, and memoirist.

He was born on January 25, 1899, in Macon County, Alabama, and studied at Alabama State and Talladega College. He preached in the South at various African Methodist Episcopal Zion churches, from 1916 until undertaking the pastorship of Mount Zion AME Zion Church in Montgomery, Alabama, in 1947.

His unsuccessful efforts in 1949 on behalf of a black teenage girl who claimed rape by two white police officers marked him as a pioneering Montgomery activist. He was indicted for his participation in the Montgomery bus boycott, and arraigned on February 24, 1956, along with 88 other boycott supporters.

On March 23, 1960, the "Committee to Defend Martin Luther King and the Struggle for Freedom in the South" published a full-page advertisement in the New York Times seeking to defend Martin Luther King Jr. and support the Civil Rights Movement. The ad ran in the March 29, 1960, edition of the Times with the title, "Heed Their Rising Voices". Seay was listed as one of the ad's supporters and was consequently included along with three other black ministers - Ralph Abernathy, Joseph Lowery, and Fred Shuttlesworth - as the defendants in a libel suit. The claims of the Montgomery city commissioner L. B. Sullivan, who brought that suit, also led to the New York Times Co. v. Sullivan (1964) case that established the public figure principle in U.S. defamation law.

From 1972, he served his denomination above the congregational level in the Greenville, Alabama, area until retiring in 1982.

He died in 1988, and in 1990 his autobiography I Was There by the Grace of God was published.
