= John Carroll (journalist) =

American newspaper editor (1942–2015)

John Sawyer Carroll (January 23, 1942 – June 14, 2015) was an American journalist and newspaper editor, known for his work as the editor of the Lexington Herald-Leader, the Los Angeles Times and The Baltimore Sun.

== Early life ==
John S. Carroll was born in New York City on January 23, 1942, to Wallace Carroll, the editor and publisher of the Winston-Salem Journal and Sentinel, and the former Margaret Sawyer. The family lived in Winston-Salem, North Carolina, until John was about 13, when they moved to Washington, D.C., where his father began working with the New York Times bureau. In 1963, the younger Carroll was graduated from Haverford College in Pennsylvania with a bachelor's degree in English.

When he was at Haverford, he and two friends were arrested and jailed when they entered the playing field during a baseball game between the Philadelphia Phillies and the New York Giants in an attempt to shake the hand of baseball player Willie Mays, according to Norman Pearlstine, a friend and classmate, later editor-in-chief of Time magazine.

== Early career ==
Upon graduation from college, Carroll went to work as a cub reporter for The Providence Journal but left within a year to serve for two years in the Army. In 1966 he was hired by The Baltimore Sun, where he covered the Vietnam War during which time he was accused of violating a news embargo and his credentials were removed by the U.S. military.

He also covered the Middle East and the Nixon White House. In 1971-72 he was a Nieman Fellow at Harvard University. In 1973 he took his first editing job with The Philadelphia Inquirer.

== Lexington Herald-Leader ==
Carroll was an editor at the Inquirer until 1979, when he left for the Lexington Herald-Leader, where he was editor and vice-president. During his tenure in Lexington, he spearheaded an investigative series of reports titled "Cheating Our Children," which exposed flaws in Kentucky's public-education system. The newspaper won two awards for the series, which helped lead to the passage of the Kentucky Education Reform Act of 1990. The ten reporters involved with the series donated the $26,500 in prize money to Alice Lloyd College in Pippa Passes, Kentucky, to establish the John S. Carroll Scholarship Fund to aid needy students from Kentucky's 5th congressional district, which is a part of Appalachia. In 1985 the newspaper published a series on widespread cheating in the University of Kentucky basketball program, which in 1986 won a Pulitzer Prize for its authors, Jeffrey Marx and Michael York.

In fall 1988, Carroll took a sabbatical from the newspaper as a member of the University of Oxford's Visiting Journalist Fellowship Programme (now the Thomson Reuters Fellowship Programme). In 1991 he became senior vice-president and editor of The Baltimore Sun, and in 1998, he became a vice-president of the Sun's parent company, Times Mirror. In 2000, Times Mirror, which also owned the Los Angeles Times, was purchased by the Tribune Company.

In 2000, after nearly 10 years as editor of the Sun, Carroll was considering leaving to run Harvard's Nieman Fellowship program. He had already begun house-hunting in Cambridge when he was recruited to be editor of the Los Angeles Times.

== Los Angeles Times ==
Carroll took over the Times when the paper's morale was said to be at an all-time low. In particular, the credibility of the Times had been hurt by revelations in 1999 of a revenue-sharing arrangement between the newspaper and Staples Center in the preparation of a 168-page magazine about the opening of the sports arena. The agreement was seen as violating the separation between advertising and journalism.

Carroll began by hiring top talent from papers on the East Coast, such as Dean Baquet, the national editor of The New York Times, whom Carroll appointed as managing editor. Carroll aimed to compete with the East Coast papers on major national and international stories. The slogan he wanted for the paper was, "A National Paper From the West."

During Carroll's five years, the newspaper earned 13 Pulitzer Prizes, compared to eight in the 1990s. The Pulitzer streak was considered to indicate a dramatic improvement in quality at the paper.

In 2003, however, Carroll began to clash with the Tribune Company's management. Because of struggles in advertising and circulation, the company wanted to reduce costs. One proposal was to use stories written at other Tribune newspapers in the Times. Carroll opposed this move because he believed top-tier newspapers investigate and write their own stories. The company also wanted to consolidate all the Washington, D.C., bureaus of the newspapers that it owned.

Financial pressures continued; during the last year-and-a-half of Carroll's editorship, the stock price of the Tribune Company declined from $50 to $36. During Carroll's tenure, nearly two hundred positions were reduced in the newsroom. In early 2005, Carroll and Baquet went through a difficult round of negotiations with the Tribune management. They reportedly proposed a plan that included staff cuts, but which was rejected by Tribune for not going far enough.

On July 20, 2005, Carroll announced that he would resign effective August 15, 2005. Baquet reportedly considered resigning as well, but decided to remain and become the paper's top editor. After leaving the Times, Carroll became a Knight Visiting Lecturer at Harvard's John F. Kennedy School of Government.

== Later life and death ==
Carroll had married Lee Huston of Lexington, Kentucky, in 1985. Carroll had two daughters, Maggie Vaughan and Katita Strathmann from a previous marriage. After he left the Los Angeles Times in 2005, Carroll and his wife returned to Lexington, where he died in his home on June 14, 2015. According to his wife, the cause was Creutzfeldt–Jakob disease, which had been diagnosed about six months before his death.

== Honors ==
From 1994 to 2003, Carroll was a member of the Pulitzer Prize board, and in 2002 he was board chairman. In 1998 he was named Editor of the Year by the National Press Foundation. In 2003 he was elected an American Academy of Arts and Sciences fellow. In 2004 he received the Committee to Protect Journalists' Burton Benjamin Award for lifetime achievement in defense of press freedom. Also in 2004, Carroll received the American Society of Newspaper Editors Leadership Award. In 2009 he received the Richard Clurman Award as a mentor of young journalists. A New York Times obituary described Carroll as "one of the most influential newspaper editors of his era" who saw journalists "almost as public servants and a free press as essential to a self-governing nation."

== In popular culture ==
According to television producer David Simon, Carroll was the basis for the character of "prize-hungry" James Whiting on the HBO show The Wire, which Simon created.
