= 1962–1963 New York City newspaper strike =

1962-63 strike within the newspaper industry of New York City

The 1962–1963 New York City newspaper strike was a strike action within the newspaper industry of New York City which ran from December 8, 1962 until March 31, 1963, lasting for a total of 114 days. Besides protesting low wages, the unions were resisting automation of the printing presses.

The strike played a pivotal role in changing the attitude of the public to daily newspapers, leading to the demise of some papers and paved the way for new print publications and the start of all-news radio in the New York Metropolitan Area.

== Preliminary actions ==
A preliminary action took place when The Newspaper Guild went on strike against the Daily News just after midnight on November 1, 1962. Guild Vice President Thomas J. Murphy indicated that the Daily News had been singled out as the union's first target "because there we have had more aggravation, more agitation, more issues, more disputes and more anti-unionism from management". The Daily News was able to keep printing on November 2, 1962 by using the presses of the New York Journal-American. Workers at the Daily News settled their issues, accepting raises of $8 per week in talks mediated by United States Secretary of Labor W. Willard Wirtz, with employees receiving an added $4.25 per week in the first year, with an additional $3.75 weekly in the subsequent year, allowing the paper to start with a print run of 1.5 million copies, short of its nation-leading normal circulation of 2,075,000 copies.

On December 4, 1962, negotiators representing the nine major newspapers offered a deal that combined an $8 increase in wages and benefits spread over two years, combined with changes in work procedures that would cut costs for the papers. Union negotiators rejected the offer from the newspapers the following day, setting their requirement of a $16 weekly raise over two years, and set a deadline of midnight on December 8 if an agreement could not be reached before then. Representatives of the Federal Mediation and Conciliation Service, including Frank H. Brown and Stephen Schlossberg, attempted to help both sides reach agreement on December 6, with "the public interest" cited as justifying federal intervention.

The strike began at 2 a.m. on December 8, when workers from the New York local of the International Typographical Union, led by their president Bert Powers, walked out from the Daily News, New York Journal-American, The New York Times, and New York World-Telegram & Sun. In addition, the New York Daily Mirror, New York Herald Tribune, New York Post, the Long Island Star Journal, and the Long Island Daily Press all suspended operations on a voluntary basis. The newspapers kept their offer of an $8 increase per week spread over two years, while the unions were looking for a $38.82 increase in the two-year period.

== Alternative media and strike impact ==
A number of publications were created or benefited from the strike. The New York Review of Books was created during the strike, issuing its first copies on February 21, 1963, with circulation reaching 75,000 during the strike, before retreating to between 50,000 and 60,000 following the strike. The Brooklyn Eagle saw circulation grow from 50,000 to 390,000 before shrinking to 154,000 before it was hit with a separate deliverers' strike on June 27, 1963.

Tiger, Tiger Burning Bright, a dramatic stage play written by playwright Peter Feibleman premiered on Broadway at the Booth Theatre in 1962. Critically acclaimed, the play closed after only 33 performances, with The New York Times saying that the play was "Fatally wounded by the newspaper strike in New York".

Fortunato Pope, publisher of the Italian-language daily newspaper Il Progresso Italo-Americano, launched an English-language tabloid called the New York Daily Report.

WABC-FM adopted a prototypical all-news radio format during the 114-day strike, preceding WINS as the first station with an all-news format in New York City.

Leonard Andrews, employed by a credit card company, the Uni-Serv Corporation, approached the company's customers about advertising in a publication he created called The New York Standard, the largest of several alternative papers published during the strike, reaching a peak circulation of more than 400,000 and appearing for 67 issues. Other substitute newspapers were The New York Daily Report and The New York Metropolitan Daily.

== Ending the strike ==
Four papers had originally been the target of the strike, but five other papers suspended printing on a voluntary basis. The New York Post was able to resume printing on March 4, 1963, by withdrawing from the Publishers Association: they would be bound by whatever settlement the other papers made, and would have no further voice in negotiating it. The New York Herald Tribune published a statement that they had chosen not to resume publishing on the same terms because of the risk that the eventual settlement would put them out of business.

New York Mayor Robert F. Wagner Jr., and labor negotiator Theodore W. Kheel were eventually able to forge an agreement to end the strike after several attempts. The first deal offered for ratification by the printers' union was rejected on March 17. In another vote on March 24, they agreed to settle, but by this time the photo engravers' union had decided to join the strike, and they did not settle until March 31.

As publication resumed, the first headline in the Daily News was "We Have News for You".

The printers would receive wage and benefit increases of $12.63 per week. Kheel noted that the contracts for all ten newspaper unions would expire on the same date in 1965, emphasizing the importance of addressing the festering labor issues.

== Aftermath ==
An analysis performed by The New York Times showed that the nine affected newspapers lost a total of more than $100 million (equivalent to $1,052 million in 2025) in advertising and circulation revenues and that the industry's more than 19,000 employees lost $50 million in wages and benefits.

After the strike was ended, both the Times and Herald Tribune doubled their price to 10 cents, one of the factors that had cut readership. As of September 30, 1963, circulation of six daily New York papers was down 11.9% on weekdays and 8.3% on Sundays based on reports from the Audit Bureau of Circulations. The John F. Kennedy assassination in November 1963 helped bring readers back to newspapers.

The New York Daily Mirror, owned by the Hearst Corporation, shut down on October 15, 1963, and sold its name and goodwill to the Daily News. The Mirror's management blamed the closure on the effects of the strike aggravating existing problems at the paper.

Cue magazine (now part of New York magazine) saw weekly circulation rise by 35,000 a year after the strike started and TV Guide had seen a jump of 350,000. Time saw New York City circulation rise by 10%.
