= International Herald Tribune =

English-language international newspaper

- The August 26, 2013 front page of the International Herald Tribune
- Type: Daily newspaper
- Format: Broadsheet
- Owner(s): Whitney Communications, The Washington Post and The New York Times Company
- Founder: James Gordon Bennett Jr.
- Founded: 1887
- Ceased publication: October 14, 2013
- Language: English
- City: Paris
- Country: France
- Sister newspapers: The New York Times (1967–2013); The Washington Post (1967–2003)
- ISSN: 0294-8052
- Website: IHT Archive(subscription may be required or content may be available in libraries)

The International Herald Tribune (IHT) was a daily English-language newspaper published in Paris, France, for international English-speaking readers. It published under the name International Herald Tribune starting in 1967, but its origins as an international newspaper trace back to 1887. Sold in over 160 countries, the International Herald Tribune produced a large amount of content until it became the second incarnation of The International New York Times in 2013, 10 years after The New York Times Company became its sole owner.

== Early years ==
In 1887, James Gordon Bennett Jr. created a Paris edition of his newspaper the New York Herald with offices at 49, avenue de l'Opéra. He called it the Paris Herald. When Bennett Jr. died, the Herald and its Paris edition came under the control of Frank Munsey. In 1924, Munsey sold the paper to the family of Ogden Reid, owners of the New-York Tribune, creating the New York Herald Tribune, while the Paris edition became the Paris Herald Tribune. By 1967, the paper was owned jointly by Whitney Communications, The Washington Post and The New York Times, and became known as the International Herald Tribune, or IHT.

== The International Herald Tribune years ==
The first issue of the International Herald Tribune was published on May 22, 1967. It continued the practices that had endeared it to American emigrants and travelers, such as carrying baseball scores and stock prices.

At the start, the paper maintained the offices it inherited from the Herald Tribune European Edition – that dated to 1931 – at 21 Rue de Berri, just off the Champs-Élysées. Columnist Art Buchwald recalled them as being "grubby" and antiquated but "the perfect location for an American newspaper abroad." Then in 1978, the paper moved its facilities to the Parisian suburb of Neuilly-sur-Seine.

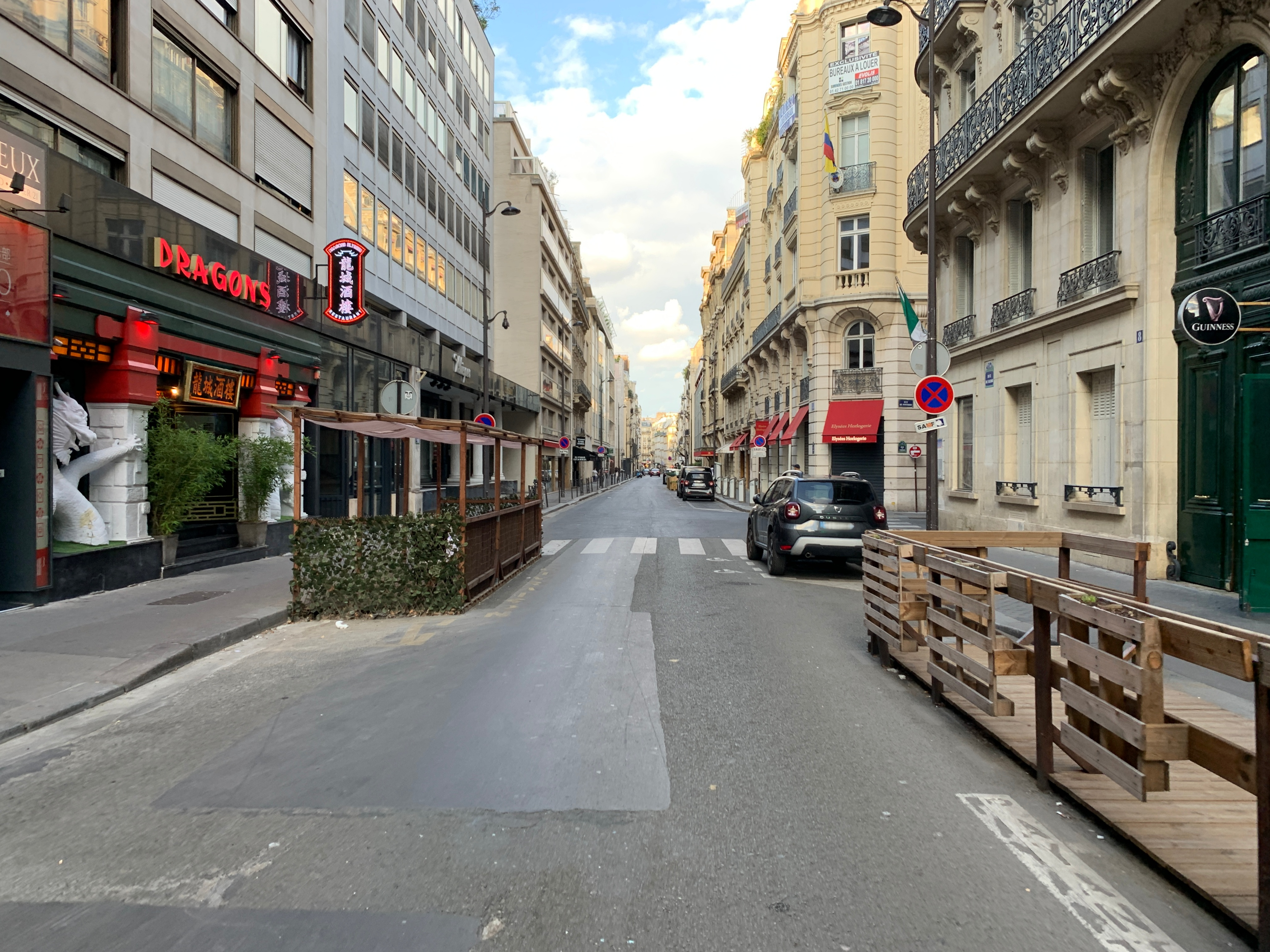
The International Herald Tribune started out at 21 Rue de Berri in central Paris, visible here as the fifth building on the left (as seen in 2021).

In 1974, the paper pioneered the innovation of doing electronic transmission of facsimile pages across borders, when it opened a remote printing facility in London. This was followed by a printing site in Zurich in 1977. The International Herald Tribune began transmitting electronic images of newspaper pages from Paris to Hong Kong via satellite in 1980, making the paper simultaneously available on opposite sides of the planet. This was the first such intercontinental transmission of an English-language daily newspaper and followed the pioneering efforts of the Chinese-language newspaper Sing Tao Daily (星島日報).

Additional printing locations followed, including Rome and Tokyo 1987; and Frankfurt 1989. By 1985, the International Herald Tribune had a circulation of 160,000, and was profitable with annual revenues of around $40 million. At the time of the paper's centennial in 1987, the IHT was opening a new print site on average each year.

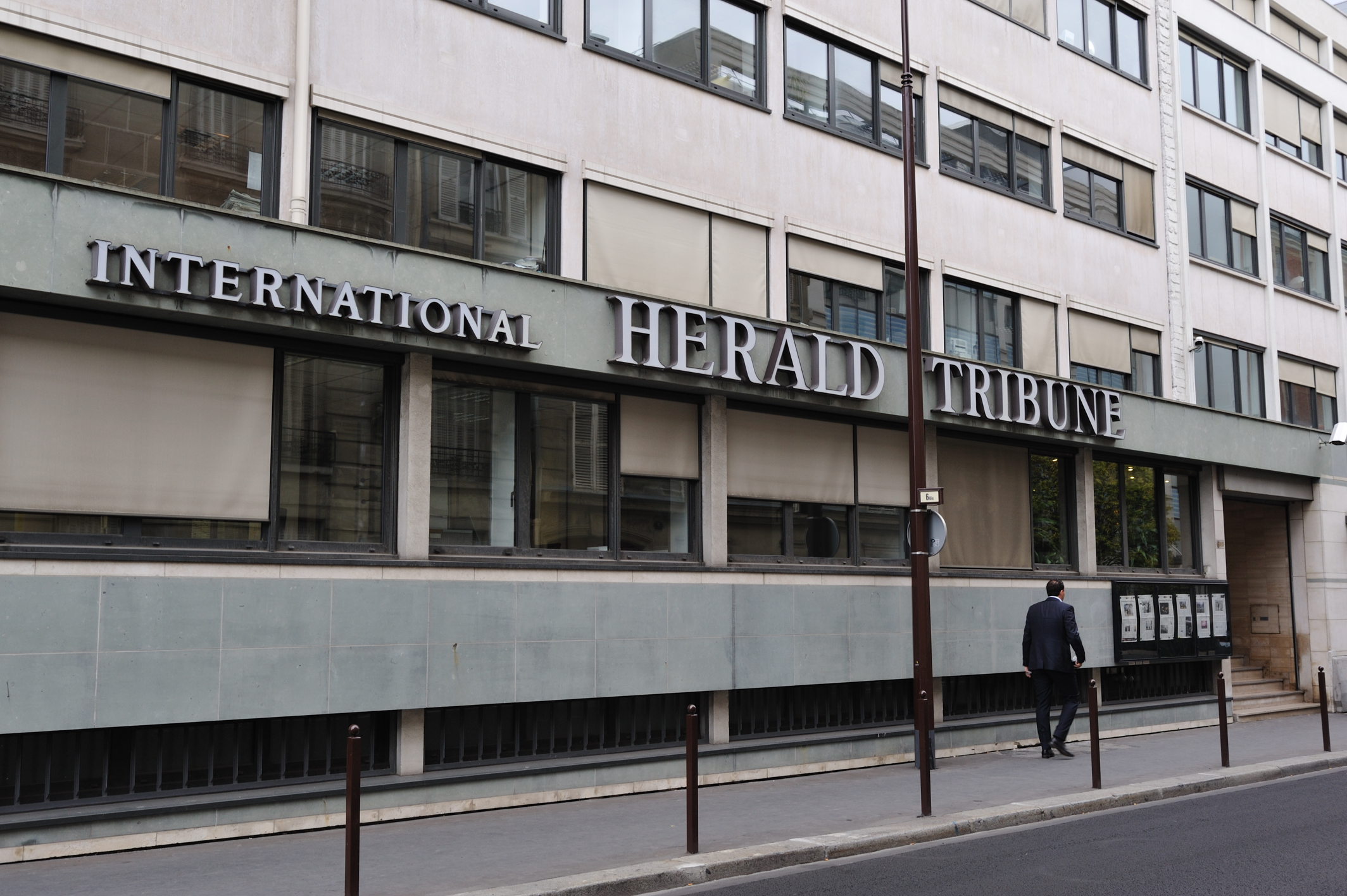
From 1978 on, the headquarters facility for the paper was in the Paris suburb of Neuilly-sur-Seine.

By the early 1990s, the paper was printed concurrently around the globe, with seven sites in Europe, three in Asia, and one in the US, allowing day-of-publication availability in all major cities worldwide. Notably, every region received the same editorial content, and even most of the advertising ran across all areas; by comparison, the international edition of The Wall Street Journal was heavily regionalized. (Several editions were published of each day's paper, however, and sometimes particular regions saw revisions that other regions might not.) Nearly 200,000 copies were sold per day, including 50,000 in Asia and 45,000 copies to airlines flying international routes. Despite the technology, however, in practice stories often appeared in the International Herald Tribune a day after they appeared in either of the parent papers. Marking a departure from its origins as a paper mostly read by the American diaspora in Europe, by this point the majority of its readers were non-American.

The International Herald Tribune's main editorial team was based in Paris, and while content for the paper largely consisted of stories, columns, and editorials from the two parent papers, the paper reported from many news sources, including its own corps of correspondents and columnists. In any case, all of the final editing was done by the Paris staff. By 2002, the International Herald Tribune had some 335 employees. Some columnists from the parent papers, such as Flora Lewis and Art Buchwald, kept publishing columns in the International Herald Tribune even after their work no longer appeared in the parent publications.

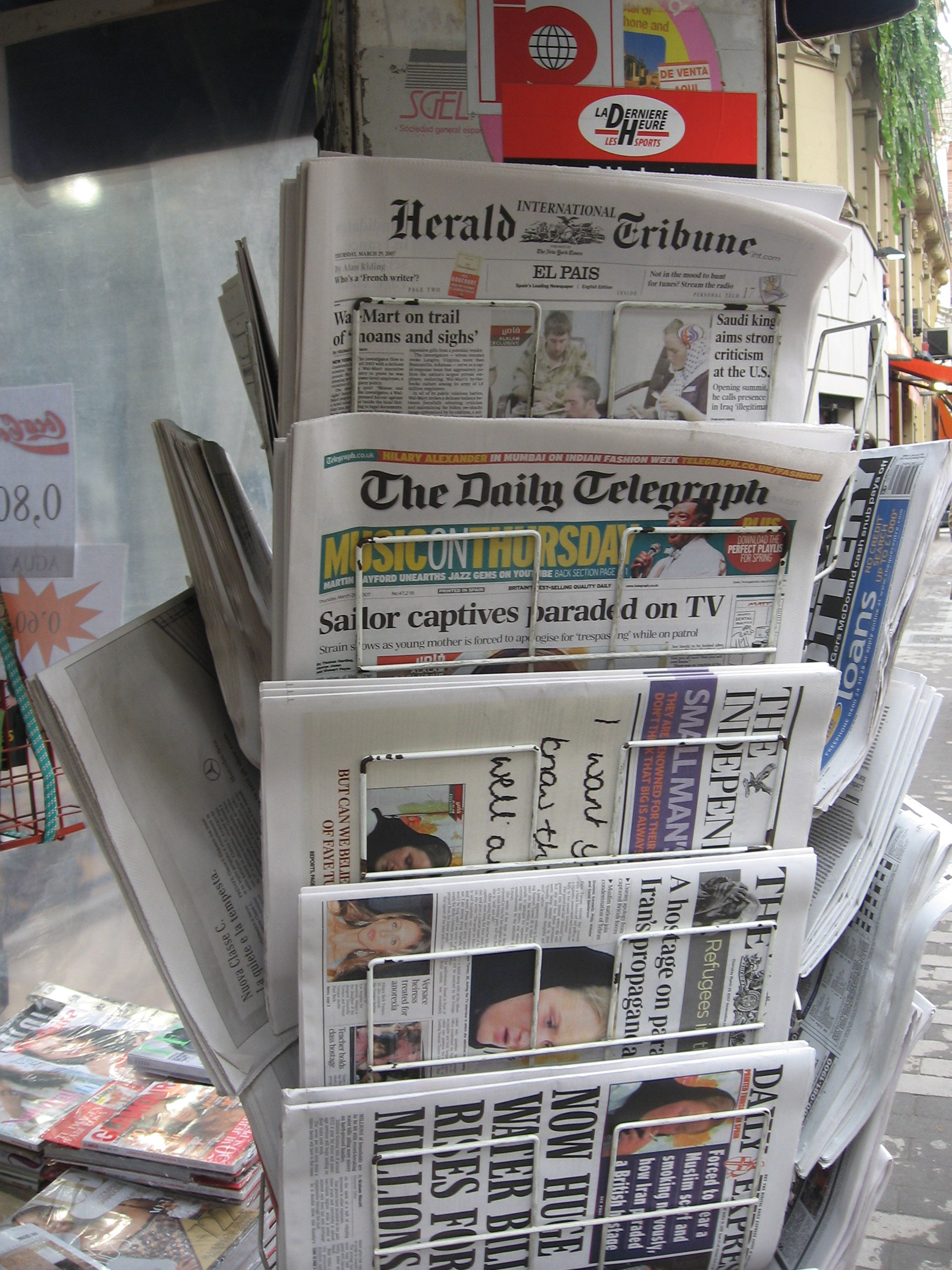
The International Herald Tribune on sale at a newsstand in Valencia, Spain, in 2007

Over the years, the International Herald Tribune faced increasing newsstand competition from the international editions of the Wall Street Journal, USA Today, and the Financial Times. Furthermore, the advent of the internationally available cable news network CNN, and later the Internet, gave Americans more readily available ways to keep up on sports scores and the like. As the 21st century dawned, there were divided opinions regarding the International Herald Tribune's place in the media world, with for instance James Ledbetter of Slate pronouncing it a relic of a by-gone era but Peter Osnos of The Atlantic believing it still had a role to play.

In October 2002, it was announced that The New York Times Company ("The Times") would buy out the Post's interest, for an amount of around $70 million. The Times thereby became the sole owner of the International Herald Tribune. The change became effective with the edition published on January 2, 2003. The headquarters for the paper remained at its site in Neuilly-sur-Seine. The Times subsequently folded the International Herald Tribune website into its own website during 2009.

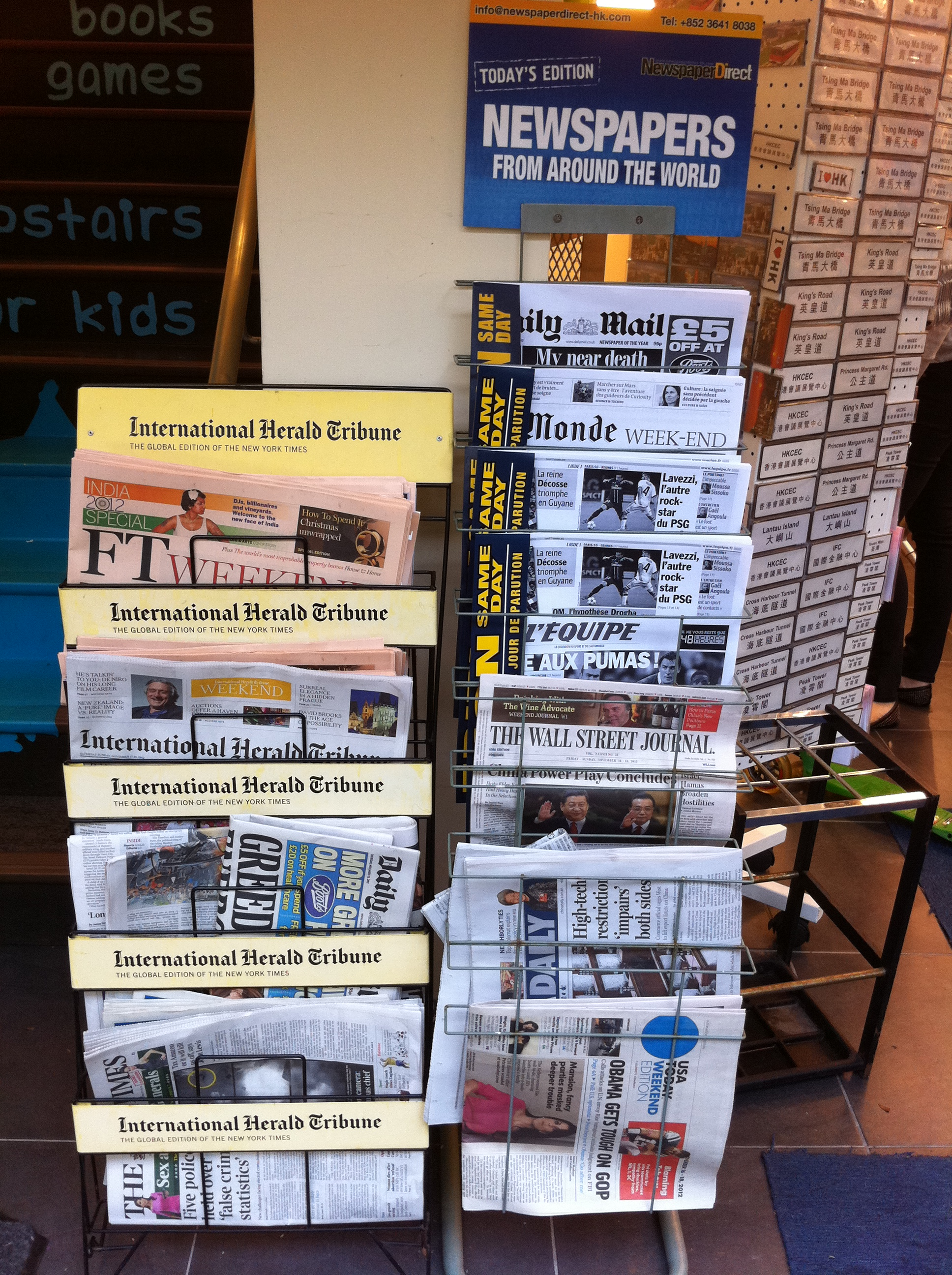
An International Herald Tribune-branded newsstand in Hong Kong, 2012

In 2005 the paper opened its Asia newsroom in Hong Kong. In April 2001, the Japanese newspaper The Asahi Shimbun (朝日新聞) tied up with the International Herald Tribune and published an English-language newspaper, the International Herald Tribune/Asahi Shimbun. After the Washington Post sold its stake in the International Herald Tribune, it continued being published under the name International Herald Tribune/Asahi Shimbun, but it was discontinued in February 2011.

By 2008, the circulation of the paper was over 240,000. By the early 2010s, the Internet edition of the paper was receiving some seven million visitors per month, and overall the IHT represented one of the biggest global media entities.

== Writers and journalists ==
Throughout its history the Paris-based paper had a renowned stable of writers and journalists. Among the most well-known were the humorist Art Buchwald, the fashion editor Suzy Menkes, jazz critic Mike Zwerin and food writers Waverly Root and Patricia Wells. Former executive editors include Philip Manning Foisie, John Vinocur, David Ignatius and Michael Getler.

== The final years ==
In 2013, the New York Times Company announced that the International Herald Tribune was being renamed The International New York Times. The last edition under ther IHT brand was published on Monday October 14 of that year.

In 2016, the Paris offices, acquired from the IHT, closed amid massive layoffs at NYT. The National Book Review called it "end of a romantic era in international journalism".

== Archives ==
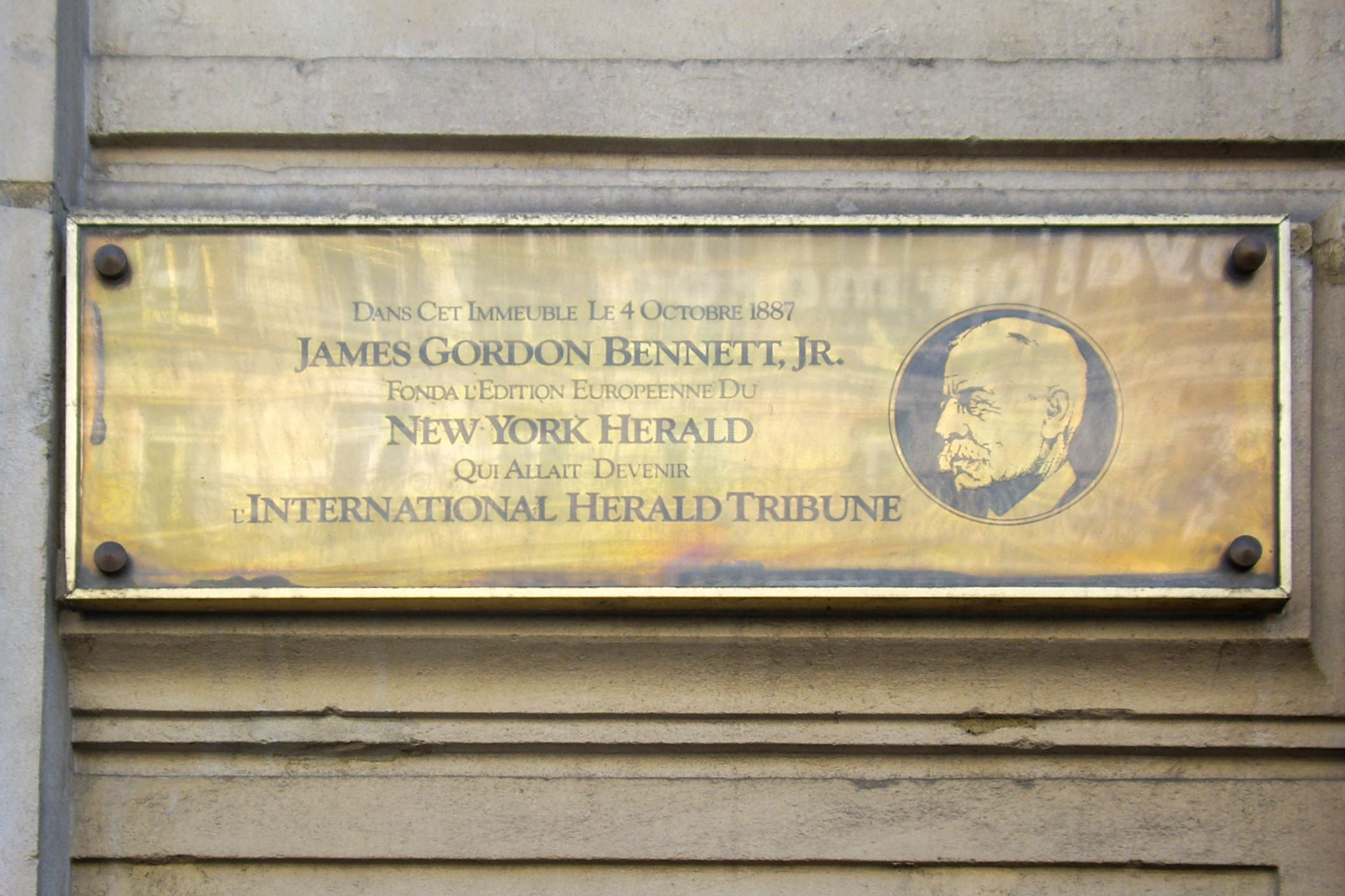
A plaque in Paris commemorates the history of the Paris edition of the New York Herald and notes that it became the International Herald Tribune.

The archives of the International Herald Tribune, all the articles from 1887 until 2013, were sold or licensed to the Gale company, where they began appearing in 2017.

This material is not available from any New York Times archive. The New York Times website does, however, host a very limited selection of "retrospective" stories from the 1887–2013 years, a collection that became available in 2017, the same year that the full archives became available on Gale.
