= Wallace Carroll =

American journalist

John Wallace Carroll (December 5, 1906 – July 28, 2002) was an American journalist, newspaper editor, and publisher, known for his 1968 editorial "Vietnam — Quo Vadis?" which called for an end to the Vietnam War and influenced President Lyndon B. Johnson’s initial withdrawal of troops from the conflict. Carroll at the time was the editor and publisher of the Winston-Salem Journal and Sentinel (1963–1974). Recognized as among the best of his generation of journalists, Carroll had previously worked as news editor for the Washington Bureau of The New York Times (1955–1963), as executive editor of the Winston-Salem Journal and Sentinel (1949–1955) and as a foreign correspondent for United Press in Europe (1929–1942). From 1942 to 1945 he headed the European division of the United States Office of War Information, charged with all propaganda efforts aimed at Nazi-conquered Europe during World War II. He was also the father of journalist John Carroll, the former editor of the Baltimore Sun, the Philadelphia Inquirer and the Los Angeles Times.

== Early life and career ==
Wallace Carroll was born in Milwaukee, Wisconsin, on December 5, 1906, to John Francis Carroll and Josephine Meyer Carroll. After graduating from Marquette University in 1928 he was hired by United Press in Chicago; six months later he was transferred to London and two years later to Paris to work as a foreign correspondent for the news service. While in Great Britain and France he covered London's hunger strikes and the Stavisky riots in Paris, reporting on the growing political and economic discontent on the continent. In 1934 he was sent to Geneva as United Press's diplomatic reporter covering the League of Nations, where he filed numerous reports on the rise of fascism in Japan, Germany and Italy. In 1938 he traveled to Spain to report on the Spanish Civil War.

== World War II coverage ==
In 1939, United Press appointed Carroll to head its London bureau, charged with covering the growing crisis with Nazi Germany and the potential for upcoming conflict. Carroll was among the first to confirm Britain's declaration of war against Germany in September 1939 and subsequently covered both the London Blitz and the Battle of Britain. In 1941 he traveled via the Arctic Circle to the Soviet Union to cover the Nazi invasion of that country, including the German advance on Moscow. On his return home via Asia, he landed in Pearl Harbor just days after the Japanese attack on the U.S. fleet and was among the first journalists allowed to view the destruction.

For his reporting on the Soviet Union Carroll won the 1942 Headliners Award. That year he also published the book We’re In This With Russia, an assessment of the Soviet Union's ability to fight off the Nazi onslaught.

== Government service ==
Carroll left journalism in 1942 when he was appointed by Elmer Davis, then director of the U.S. Office of War Information (OWI), to head up the organization's European operations based in London. The position required Carroll to work closely with both the Political Warfare Executive, a secret British agency created in 1941 to produce and disseminate propaganda, as well as with General Dwight Eisenhower’s Psychological Warfare Branch. Following a dispute with Robert Sherwood, then heading up OWI’s New York office, Carroll resigned his position but returned several months later at the request of Davis to head up European operations based in Washington D.C. During this time, Carroll was instrumental in developing communication strategies aimed at ensuring the preservation of Rome and in minimizing the Luftwaffe’s presence during D-Day, among other campaigns. On the dissolution of OWI in 1945 he wrote Persuade or Perish, which summarized Allied wartime propaganda efforts (published in 1948).

== Return to journalism ==
Following the war, Carroll returned to journalism in 1949 as executive editor of Winston-Salem Journal and Sentinel in North Carolina.

=== The New York Times ===
In 1955 Carroll was recruited by The New York Times Washington bureau chief, James R. Reston, to serve as news editor for the bureau, based in Washington D.C. While there he oversaw what has often been called the “golden years” of the bureau, during which numerous journalists under Carroll and Reston's direction garnered fame and recognition. These included Russell Baker, Tom Wicker, Allen Drury, Anthony Lewis, and Max Frankel, among others.

=== Winston-Salem Journal and Sentinel ===
Carroll left The New York Times in 1963 to return to Winston-Salem as editor and publisher of the Winston-Salem Journal and Sentinel. His return coincided with the surgeon general's report on the dangers of smoking in 1964. Carroll, despite the economic dependency of the region on the tobacco industry, directed the paper to fully cover the dangers of smoking to the public. He also helped lead efforts on the creation of the North Carolina School of the Arts in Winston-Salem, as well as the desegregation of schools in the city. Toward the end of his career, he championed environmental causes, leading the Winston-Salem Journal to a Pulitzer Prize for environmental reporting in 1971. Following his retirement from the paper in 1974 he worked as a director of the national effort to preserve the New River Valley.

A voice of journalism in the South, Carroll wrote and lectured frequently on the ethics of his profession. He served on both the Nieman Fellowship selection boards as well as the Pulitzer Prize boards (1968–1973). He also provided frequent advice to the U.S. State Department on U.S.-Soviet relations.

== Personal life ==
Carroll was married to the former Margaret (Peggy) Sawyer. He and Peggy had four children: Margaret, John, Rosamund (Posie) and Patricia. John Carroll became a well-known journalist, whose leadership at the LA Times "was like watching Willie Mays play baseball," according to his colleague, New York Times Executive Editor Dean Baquet. Like his father, John was a member of the Pulitzer Prize Board, and garnered numerous journalism awards before his death in 2015.
