= Michael Getler =

American journalist

- Born: November 13, 1935; The Bronx, New York, U.S.
- Died: March 15, 2018 (aged 82); Washington, D.C., U.S.
- Education: City College of New York
- Occupations: Journalist, ombudsman
- Spouse: Sandra Curhan
- Children: 2

Michael Getler (November 13, 1935 – March 15, 2018) was an American journalist.

== Biography ==
Getler was ombudsman for the Public Broadcasting Service in the United States.

He was the first holder of this post, and the first ombudsman to be appointed at any of the major American television networks. His previous posts included ombudsman at the Washington Post from 2000 to 2005 and executive editor at the International Herald Tribune from 1996 to 2000. Prior to those positions, he was a reporter (covering defense and military affairs), foreign correspondent, foreign editor, assistant managing editor and deputy managing editor for the Washington Post from 1970 to 1996.

According to the Family Jewels documents, he was under surveillance by the CIA in 1971 for having "run a story which was an obvious intelligence leak".

Prior to the start of his journalism career, Getler was a United States naval aviator.

Getler died of bile duct cancer in Washington, D.C., at the age of 82.
