= Bert Powers =

- Born: Bertram Anthony Powers; March 8, 1922; Cambridge, Massachusetts
- Died: December 23, 2006 (aged 84); Washington, D.C.
- Occupation(s): Printer, labor leader
- Title: President, New York Typographical Union No. 6
- Term: 1961–1990
- Spouse: Patricia Powers (died in 1988)
- Children: Brian Powers, Kevin Powers, Patricia Inciardi, Moya Keating

Bertram Anthony "Bert" Powers (March 8, 1922 – December 23, 2006) was an American labor leader who was best known for leading his union, the New York Typographical Union No. 6, into the 114-day 1962–63 New York City newspaper strike against four New York City newspapers. Powers was born in Cambridge, Massachusetts, and died in Washington, D.C., at the Washington Home hospice of pneumonia.

He became a printer after a 1937 accident and moved to New York City in 1946, where he eventually rose to become vice president of the New York local of the International Typographical Union in 1953. Powers was elected president of the ITU local in 1961 and faced a December 1962 end of the existing labor contract with the New York Publishers Association, the trade and bargaining association for nine New York City newspapers.

After talks failed, he called a strike on December 8, 1962, which ended March 31, 1963, and lasted for 114 days. As a result of that strike, Mr. Powers gained local and national attention, and his photo was on the cover of Time magazine for the March 1, 1963, issue with the blurb: "Is Labor's Only Weapon a Monkey Wrench?"

In 1974, Powers and the publishers reached an historic deal. In return for guaranteed jobs for the printers then working, the publishers were free to computerize (or automate) the setting of type, thus gaining labor savings and faster composing of the page contents for each edition.

Powers retired as president of the local in 1990, after the ITU had merged into the CWA in 1987.

== See also ==
- International Typographical Union
- 1962 New York City newspaper strike
