= John Vinocur =

American journalist (1940–2022)

- Born: John Eli Vinocur; June 17, 1940; New York City, U.S.
- Died: February 6, 2022 (aged 81); Amsterdam, Netherlands
- Education: Oberlin College
- Occupations: Journalist; columnist; editor
- Spouses: Martine Weill (m. 1960, divorced) Elisabeth Schmidt (m. 1966, divorced) Harriet Berglund (m. 1985)
- Partner: Jacqueline Schaap
- Children: 4

John Eli Vinocur (June 17, 1940 – February 6, 2022) was an American journalist, editor, and columnist known for his coverage of international news. He was metro editor for The New York Times, after serving as the paper's bureau chief in France and Germany, before becoming the executive editor for the International Herald Tribune. Later in his career, he was a columnist for the Tribune and The Wall Street Journal.

== Personal life ==
Vinocur was born in Queens on May 17, 1940. According to his obit in the New York Times, Vinocur was "the son of Harry Vinocur, a journalist and historian who wrote under the pen name John Stuart, and Helen (Segal) Vinocur, who headed the family philanthropy office of the heiress Rosenwald Ascoli, which was concerned mainly with child welfare." He graduated from Forest Hills High School and from Oberlin College in Ohio.

He was married three times; first to Martine Weill and Elisabeth Schmidt, with both marriages ending in divorce, and then to Harriet Berglund, who he was married to from 1985 onwards. He was in a relationship with Jacqueline Schaap at the time he died. He had four children and lived in Paris at his death.

Vincour died in Amsterdam from complications of sepsis on February 6, 2022, at the age of 81.

== Career ==
Vincour began his journalism career for local newspapers outside of New York City and Agence France-Presse before he was hired by the Associated Press. There, he covered major events around the world in 1968, including wars in Biafra, Israel and Cambodia.

He subsequently moved to The New York Times, where he was the paper's bureau chief in Germany (1977–1982) and France (1982–1985), before returning to the United States and eventually becoming the paper's metro editor, in charge of local and regional news coverage. He then became a senior correspondent at the International Herald Tribune reporting on matters ranging from politics and economics to sports and culture in Europe, Asia and the United States. He was the paper's executive executive editor and served in that post, as well as that of the newspaper's vice president, from 1986 until 1996.

=== Awards ===
In 1986, Vinocur was awarded the George Polk Award for Magazine Reporting. In June 2008, he was awarded the French Légion d'Honneur by the President of France Nicolas Sarkozy.
