= Susan Tifft =

American journalist, author and educator

- Born: Susan Elizabeth Tifft; February 14, 1951; Rumford, Maine
- Died: April 1, 2010 (aged 59); Cambridge, Massachusetts
- Education: Duke University
- Occupation: Journalist
- Spouse: Alex S. Jones

Susan Tifft (February 14, 1951 — April 1, 2010) was an American journalist, author, and educator.

== Early life and education ==
Tifft was born to Austin and Elizabeth Tifft in Rumford, Maine, on February 14, 1951. She grew up there and in St. Louis, where her father moved for his work in the early 1960s. She had a younger brother and sister, as well as an older brother who died as a child in Maine. Tifft later said of her childhood that she felt that she "grew up in a Currier & Ives Christmas card, more in the 19th century than in the 20th."

Tifft attended Duke University, where she was the commencement speaker and became the second-ever Young Trustee. She graduated in 1973 with a bachelor's degree in English. While at Duke, she served as intern for Durham's ABC affiliate WTVD, covering the North Carolina state legislature and Senator Jesse Helm's first term in office. She also wrote for campus newspaper The Chronicle and for The Archive, a student literary magazine. Tifft also earned a master's degree in public administration from the John F. Kennedy School of Government at Harvard in 1982.

== Career ==
=== Journalist ===
After graduating from Duke, Tifft began working with Joel Fleishman, professor of law and public policy, to edit his book on campaign finance reform. She used that specialized knowledge to obtain jobs in Washington, D. C., including serving as assistant press secretary at the Federal Election Commission, press secretary at the 1980 Democratic National Convention, and a speechwriter for the Carter-Mondale presidential election campaign. In 1982, Tifft began working at Time magazine covering national politics. She eventually rose to associate editor before leaving the magazine in 1991.

At Time, one of Tifft's first major assignments was to cover the 1984 presidential election, a task she found difficult to take on so early in her career. She received one of her early breaks in 1986, when she happened to be working late when word arrived that Ferdinand Marcos had fled the Philippines. Tift wrote the cover story overnight and covered subsequent events in the Philippines. As associate editor for the education section from 1988 to 1991, Tifft wrote numerous articles on national education. One cover story, entitled "Who's Teaching our Children?", won the 1989 Benjamin Fine Award for Excellence in Education Writing.

With her husband Alex Jones, Tifft covered the story of the Courier-Journal sale in 1986; Jones won the Pulitzer Prize for his reportage of the story. In 1991 they co-authored The Patriarch: The Rise and Fall of the Bingham Dynasty, a book on the Louisville newspaper owners. In 1999, the pair co-authored The Trust: The Private and Powerful Family Behind The New York Times, the first full-scale portrait of Adolph Ochs and his descendants. The book won the A. M. Sperber Award for Exceptional Achievement in Writing and Research and was a finalist for the National Book Critics Circle Award in biography.

=== Academic ===
From 1998 to 2009, Tifft served as the Eugene C. Patterson Professor of the Practice of Journalism at the Sanford School of Public Policy at Duke University. She shared the Patterson chair with Jones until the fall of 2000, when she became the sole Patterson professor. During this time she also served as a member of the Duke Magazine editorial advisory board.

Tifft was a popular professor who received good ratings from students, although she was very demanding. Sanford School dean Bruce Kuniholm noted that "she'd make them write and rewrite and rewrite. They learned so much from her." Tifft considered teaching the most important work of her life.

In 2009, the Sanford School established an undergraduate teaching award in Tifft's name.

== Personal life ==
Tifft met her husband, Alex Jones, during post-graduate studies at Harvard in 1981-82. They married in 1985.

== Death ==
Tifft was diagnosed with metastatic endometrial cancer on August 7, 2007, and began chemotherapy on August 27. Throughout her treatment she wrote extensively in a blog documenting her disease and its treatment in a "breezy, up-tempo" way, sometimes under the byline of "Cancer Chick." Tifft entered hospice care at her Massachusetts apartment on March 23, 2010. She died there on the morning of April 1 in the company of her husband, brother, sister, and sister-in-law.

Husband Alex Jones established the Susan Tifft Fund at Duke University in her memory, providing internship funds and research grants for undergraduate students in journalism or media studies.
