= Alex S. Jones =

American journalist (born 1946)

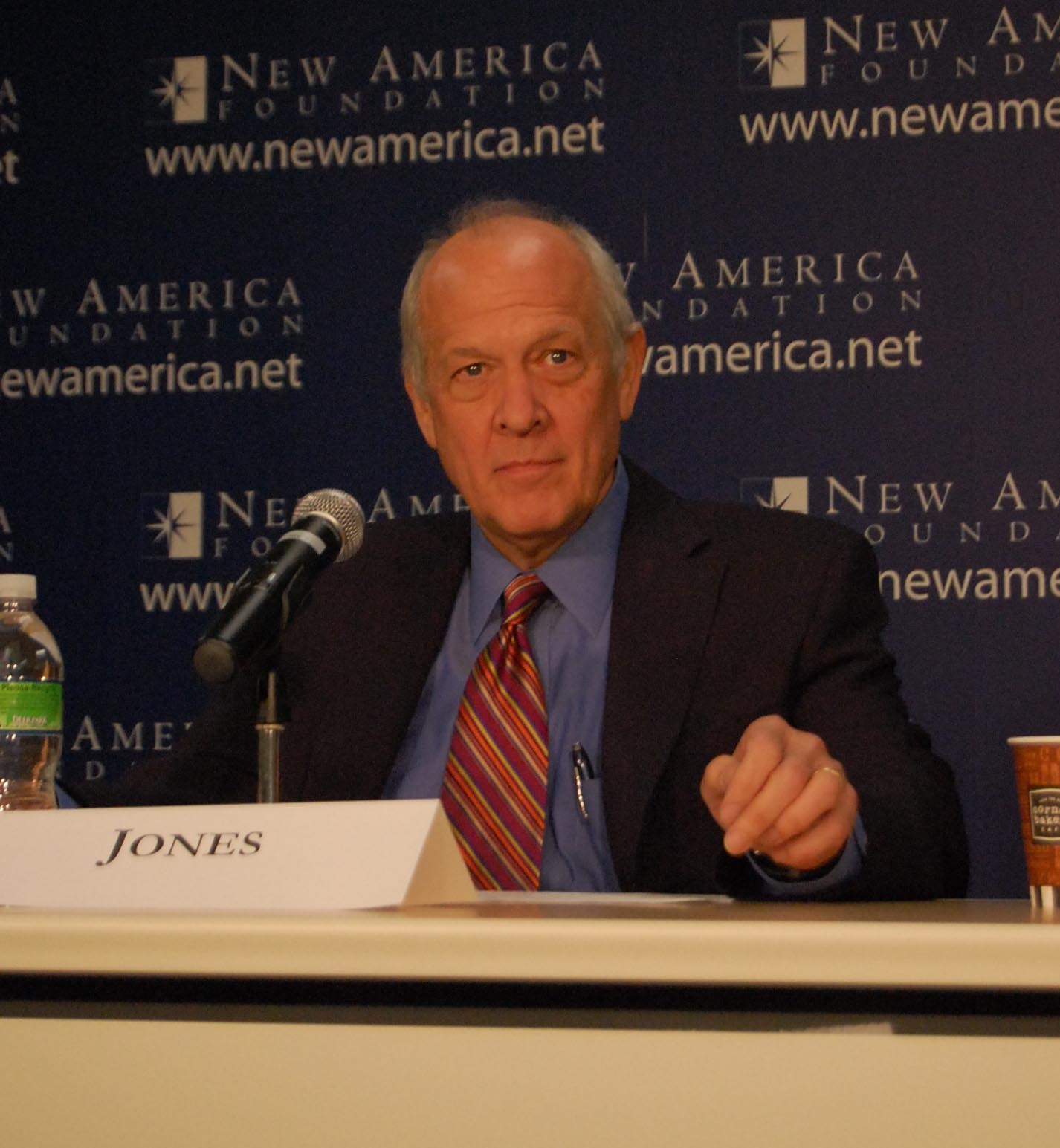
- Jones at Shorenstein Center in 2009
- Born: November 19, 1946 (age 79); Greeneville, Tennessee, U.S.
- Education: Washington & Lee
- Occupation: Journalist
- Spouse: Susan Elizabeth Tifft (1985–2010)

Alex S. Jones (born November 19, 1946) is an American journalist who was director of the Shorenstein Center on Media, Politics and Public Policy at Harvard's John F. Kennedy School of Government from July 1, 2000, until June 2015. He won a Pulitzer Prize for journalism in 1987.

== Early years and career ==
Jones covered the newspaper industry for The New York Times from 1983 until 1992. His prize-winning story "The Fall of the House of Bingham" concerned events that ended in 1986 with the sale of Louisville, Kentucky media—two newspapers and three broadcast stations—after 15 years of management by Barry Bingham, Jr. The following year Jones won the annual Pulitzer Prize for Specialized Reporting (predecessor of the Pulitzer Prize for Beat Reporting), recognizing that work as "a skillful and sensitive report of a powerful newspaper family's bickering and how it led to the sale of a famed media empire."

He and his wife Susan E. Tifft (1951–2010) wrote long books about two newspaper dynasties, beginning with the Binghams in 1991 and focusing on Barry Bingham, Sr., The Patriarch: The Rise and Fall of the Bingham Dynasty (Summit Books, 574pp). A review in the Los Angeles Times called it "the best kind of family history—one so packed with archival fact and telling anecdote that a reader can be excused for believing that at times he or she understands the Binghams far better than they seem to have understood themselves." Jones and Tifft followed The Dynasty with a 1999 book about the history of Adolph S. Ochs and his descendants, The Trust: The Private and Powerful Family Behind the New York Times (Little, Brown, 870pp). The book was a finalist for the National Book Critics Circle Award and selected by Time magazine as one of the five best nonfiction books of that year.

Jones's third book, Losing the News: The Future of the News That Feeds Democracy (Oxford, 2009, 234pp), explored the changing U.S. media landscape and its implications for American democracy. Writing for the Nieman Reports, Jones asserted that despite market pressures, "authentic journalistic objectivity" must remain at the center of the future of news reporting. Writing for The New York Times, Sir Harold Evans, former editor of the Sunday Times of London, called Jones a "bringer of light in the encircling gloom."

From 1995 until 1997, Jones was host of NPR's On the Media From 1996 until 2003, he was executive editor and host of PBS's Media Matters. Jones was a Nieman Fellow in 1982. Currently, Jones sits on the organization's advisory board. He also sits on the boards of the International Center for Journalists, the Sigma Delta Chi Foundation and other journalism-related boards.

Jones and his late wife were named Honorary Doctors of Humane Letters by Washington and Lee University, his alma mater. In 2011, he was elected to the American Academy of Arts and Sciences and in 2014 inducted into the Tennessee Journalism Hall of Fame.

== Personal life ==
Jones' family owned The Greeneville Sun in Greeneville, Tennessee until selling that and the family's other media properties in 2016. The newspaper was the flagship of the Jones Media Inc., a group of small-town dailies, weeklies and monthlies in Tennessee and North Carolina, and he served on the company's board.

In 1964, he graduated from Episcopal High School in Alexandria, Virginia, and serves on the school's Board of Trustees. He graduated from Washington and Lee University in 1968 and served aboard USS Kearsarge and USS Coral Sea as a naval officer.

In 1985, Jones was married to Susan Elizabeth Tifft, a Time magazine journalist from 1982 to 1991. In 1998, they became jointly Patterson Professor of the Practice of Journalism at the Duke University Sanford School of Public Policy. Susan was diagnosed with cancer in 2007; she died in her Cambridge, Massachusetts home on April 1, 2010. They had no children.
