= Heed Their Rising Voices =

1960 New York Times advertisement

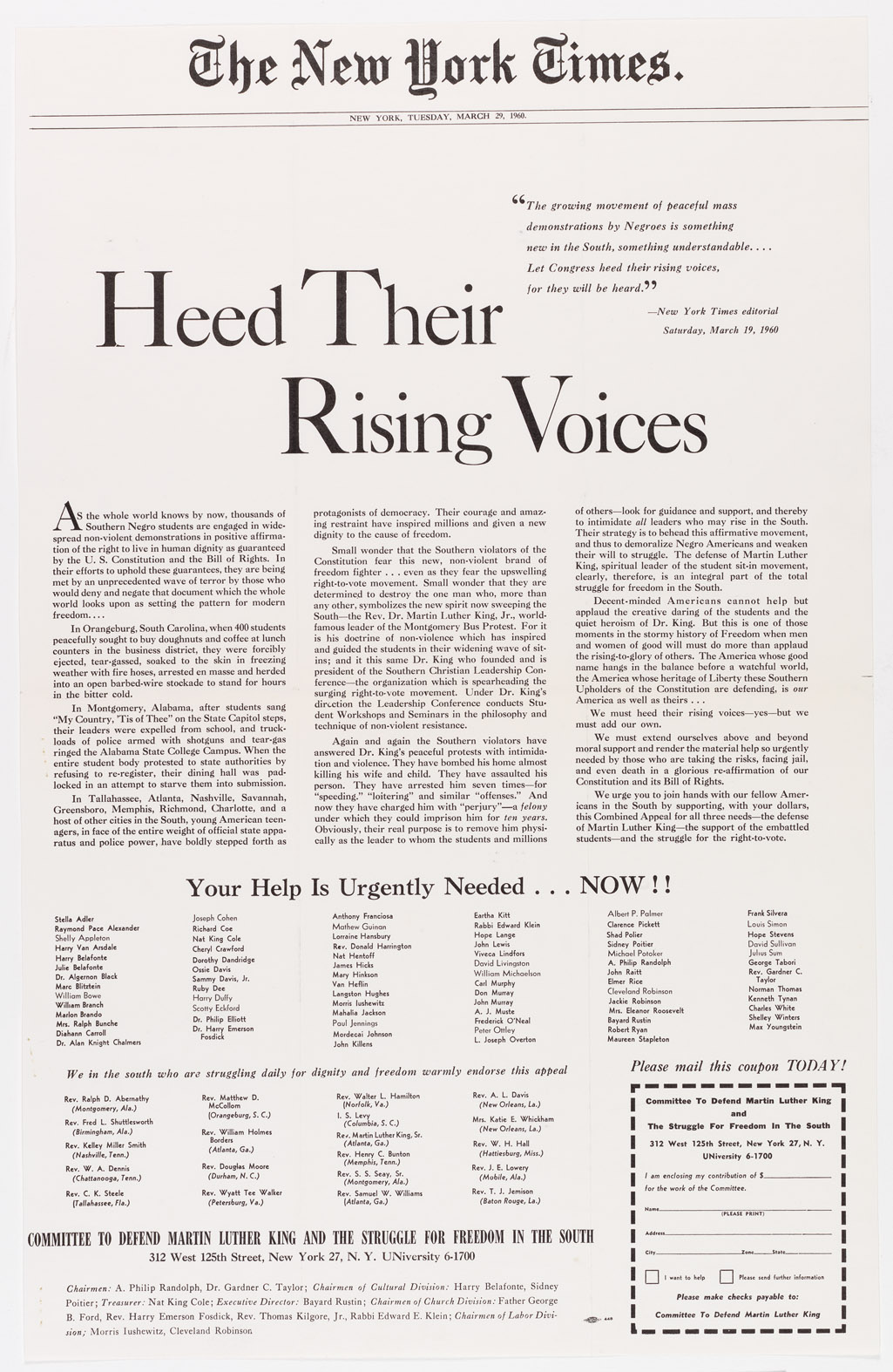
Published in New York Times on March 29, 1960

"Heed Their Rising Voices" is a 1960 newspaper advertisement published in The New York Times. It was published on March 29, 1960, and paid for by the "Committee to Defend Martin Luther King and the Struggle for Freedom in the South". The purpose of the advertisement was to attract attention and steer support towards Martin Luther King Jr. A recent felony charge of perjury was leveled against King and could have resulted in a lengthy imprisonment. The headline of the advertisement was drawn from a phrase used in the New York Times editorial, "Amendment XV", published on March 19, 1960.

The advertisement contained numerous factual inaccuracies, such as claiming that King had been arrested seven times, when it was actually four, and police "ringing" the Alabama State College Campus, when they actually only deployed near it. Because of these errors, Montgomery Public Safety commissioner L. B. Sullivan, who himself was not named in the article, sued the New York times for libel. After Sullivan won $500,000 in damages, the case was appealed to the Supreme Court, resulting in the landmark case New York Times Co. v. Sullivan (1964). In it, Justice William J. Brennan Jr. wrote the majority opinion for the unanimous Warren Court, holding that public officials, such as Sullivan, must prove that the defendant spoke with "actual malice– that is, with knowledge that it was false or with reckless disregard” of the truth. The case against the Times was then dropped.

== See also ==
- Civil Rights Movement
- Text of "Heed Their Rising Voices"
