= Marc Lacey =

American journalist

- Born: 1967–1968; Queens, New York City, U.S.
- Education: Cornell University (BA); George Washington University (MIPP)
- Occupation: Journalist
- Years active: 1983–current

Marc Lacey is an American journalist and, since 2022, managing editor of The New York Times.

== Early life and education ==
Lacey was born in Queens and grew up in Mandeville, Jamaica, and Upstate New York.

Lacey graduated from Cornell University in Ithaca, New York, in 1987, where he majored in biology and society. As a freshman at Cornell, Lacey joined The Cornell Daily Sun, an independent newspaper published primarily by Cornell students, and eventually became editor-in-chief. He was a campus stringer during his senior year at Cornell for The New York Times.

He received a master's degree in international policy and practice from George Washington University's Elliott School of International Affairs in 2002.

== Career ==
Lacey began as a summer reporting intern for The Washington Post after college, covering local news from the Alexandria, Virginia, bureau. For two years, he was a reporter at The Buffalo News in Buffalo, New York. He was a general assignment and city hall reporter for five years for the Los Angeles Times, then a Washington correspondent covering Congress for the Los Angeles Times for another five years. He has been part of two teams of journalists that have won Pulitzer Prizes for spot news reporting: first, covering the 1992 Los Angeles riots, then the 1994 Northridge earthquake

Lacey then joined The New York Times in 1999 as a correspondent. He first covered the White House and U.S. Department of State in Washington, D.C., then reported from Nairobi, Kenya, as Nairobi bureau chief, and Mexico City, as bureau chief for Mexico, Central America, and the Caribbean. He rose through the ranks at The Times, holding roles including: Deputy Foreign Editor, Weekend Editor, Deputy National Editor, Associate Managing Editor, National Editor, Assistant Managing Editor and in turn, Managing Editor. He shares the role, the second highest at the newspaper, with Carolyn Ryan.

Lacey co-moderated the fourth Democratic presidential primary debate on October 15, 2019, with Anderson Cooper and Erin Burnett.

As national editor, then as assistant managing editor, Lacey served on The New York Times' 2020 Committee, which sought to modernize the newspaper's digital strategy and oversaw the launch of the Live platform, which then-executive editor Dean Baquet and his then-deputy, Joe Kahn, called "the engaging and demanding platform for dynamic coverage of the biggest news stories."
