= Panic of 1910–11 =

Minor economic depression

The Panic of 1910–11 was a minor economic depression that followed the enforcement of the Sherman Antitrust Act, which regulates the competition among enterprises, trying to avoid monopolies and, generally speaking, a failure of the market itself. The short-term panic lasted approximately 1 year and led to a drop of the major U.S. stock market index by ~26%. It mostly affected the stock market and business traders who were smarting from the activities of trust busters, especially with the breakup of the Standard Oil Company and the American Tobacco company.

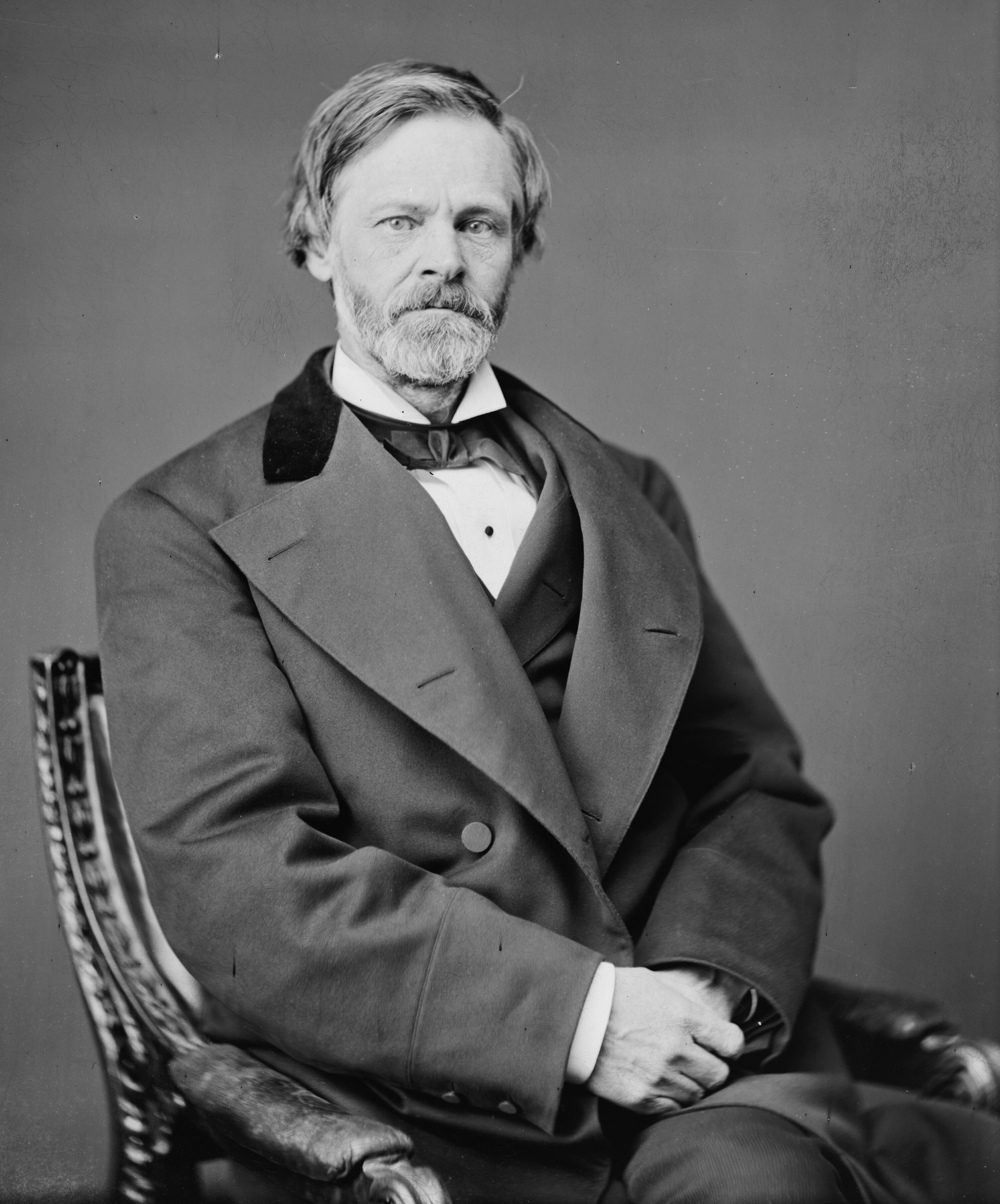
Senator John Sherman, the main proposer of the Sherman Antitrust Act

== See also ==
- 1910 and 1911 in the United States
- Federal Reserve Act
- Great Depression in the United States
- List of recessions in the United States
- Van Schaick and Company, one of several investment firms that failed during this period
