= The New York Times =

American daily newspaper

- All the News That's Fit to Print

- The New York Times print edition on January 13, 2024
- Type: Daily newspaper
- Format: Broadsheet
- Owner: The New York Times Company
- Founders: Henry Jarvis Raymond; George Jones; Edward B. Wesley
- Publisher: A. G. Sulzberger
- Editor-in-chief: Joseph Kahn
- Managing editor: Marc Lacey; Carolyn Ryan
- Staff writers: 1,700 (2023)
- Founded: September 18, 1851; 175 years ago
- Political alignment: Left-leaning
- Language: English
- Headquarters: The New York Times Building, Manhattan, U.S.
- Country: United States
- Circulation: 13.35 million news subscribers (Note: Includes 12.8 million digital-only subscribers.) (as of June 30, 2026)
- Sister newspapers: International Herald Tribune (1967–2013); The New York Times International Edition (1943–1967; 2013–present)
- ISSN: 0362-4331 (print); 1553-8095 (web)
- OCLC number: 1645522
- Website: nytimes.com

The New York Times (NYT) (Note: Also referred to as simply The Times or the NY Times. The New York Times uses the domain nytimes.com.) is a newspaper based in Manhattan, New York City. The New York Times covers domestic, national, and international news, and publishes opinion pieces and reviews. One of the longest-running newspapers in the United States, the Times serves as one of the country's newspapers of record. As of June 2026, The New York Times had 13.35 million total subscribers: 550,000 print and 12.8 million digital, both the highest numbers for any newspaper in the United States by a significant margin. The New York Times is published by the New York Times Company. Since 1896, the company has been chaired by the Ochs-Sulzberger family. The current chairman and the paper's publisher is A. G. Sulzberger. The Times is headquartered at The New York Times Building in Midtown Manhattan.

The Times was founded as the conservative New-York Daily Times in 1851, and came to national recognition in the 1870s with its aggressive coverage of corrupt politician Boss Tweed. Following the Panic of 1893, Chattanooga Times publisher Adolph Ochs gained a controlling interest in the company. In 1935, Ochs was succeeded by his son-in-law, Arthur Hays Sulzberger, who began a push into European news. Sulzberger's son Arthur Ochs Sulzberger became publisher in 1963, adapting to a changing newspaper industry and introducing radical changes. The New York Times was involved in the landmark 1964 U.S. Supreme Court case New York Times Co. v. Sullivan, which restricted the ability of public officials to sue the media for defamation.

In 1971, The New York Times published the Pentagon Papers, an internal Department of Defense document detailing the United States's historical involvement in the Vietnam War, despite pushback from then-president Richard Nixon. In the landmark decision New York Times Co. v. United States (1971), the Supreme Court ruled that the First Amendment guaranteed the right to publish the Pentagon Papers. In the 1980s, the Times began a two-decade progression to digital technology and launched nytimes.com in 1996. In the 21st century, it shifted its publication online amid the global decline of newspapers.

Currently, the Times maintains several regional bureaus staffed with journalists across six continents. It has expanded to several other publications, including The New York Times Magazine, The New York Times International Edition, and The New York Times Book Review. In addition, the paper has produced several television series, podcasts—including The Daily—and games through The New York Times Games. Among other accolades, it has been awarded the Pulitzer Prize 135 times since 1918, the most of any publication. However, The New York Times has been involved in a number of controversies in its history. According to a 2025 Pew Research Center study on educational differences among audiences of 30 major U.S. news outlets, The New York Times had the highest proportion of college-educated readers among the daily newspapers surveyed, with 56% of its audience holding at least a bachelor's degree.

The New York Times is sometimes referred to as "The Gray Lady", a nickname which references both the color of newsprint and the Times' opposition to yellow journalism.

== History ==
=== 1851–1896 ===
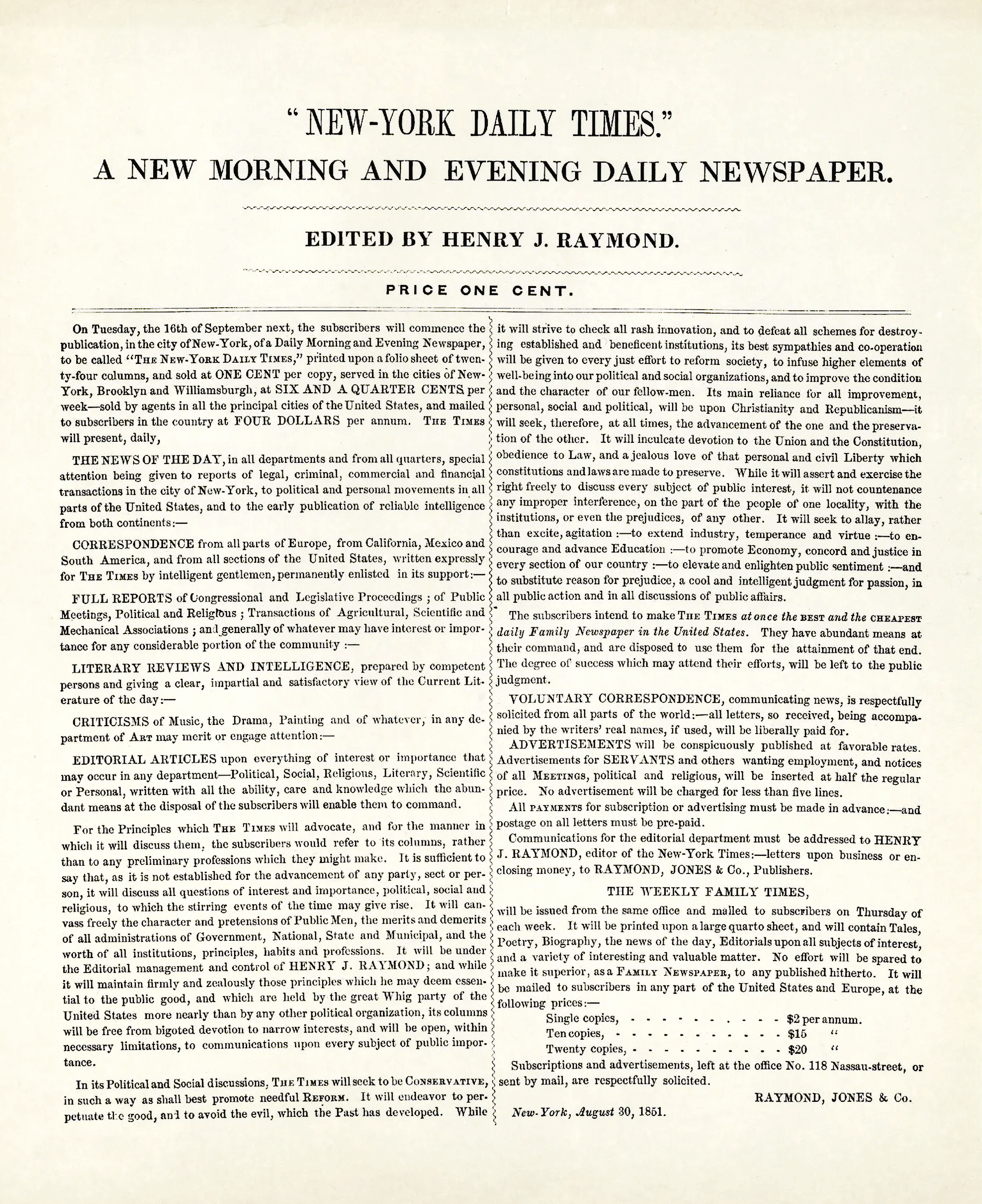
This pre-publication prospectus presented the newspaper's philosophies, including that it "will canvass freely the character and pretensions of Public Men, the merits and demerits of all administrations of Government, National, State and Municipal, and the worth of all institutions, principles, habits and professions".

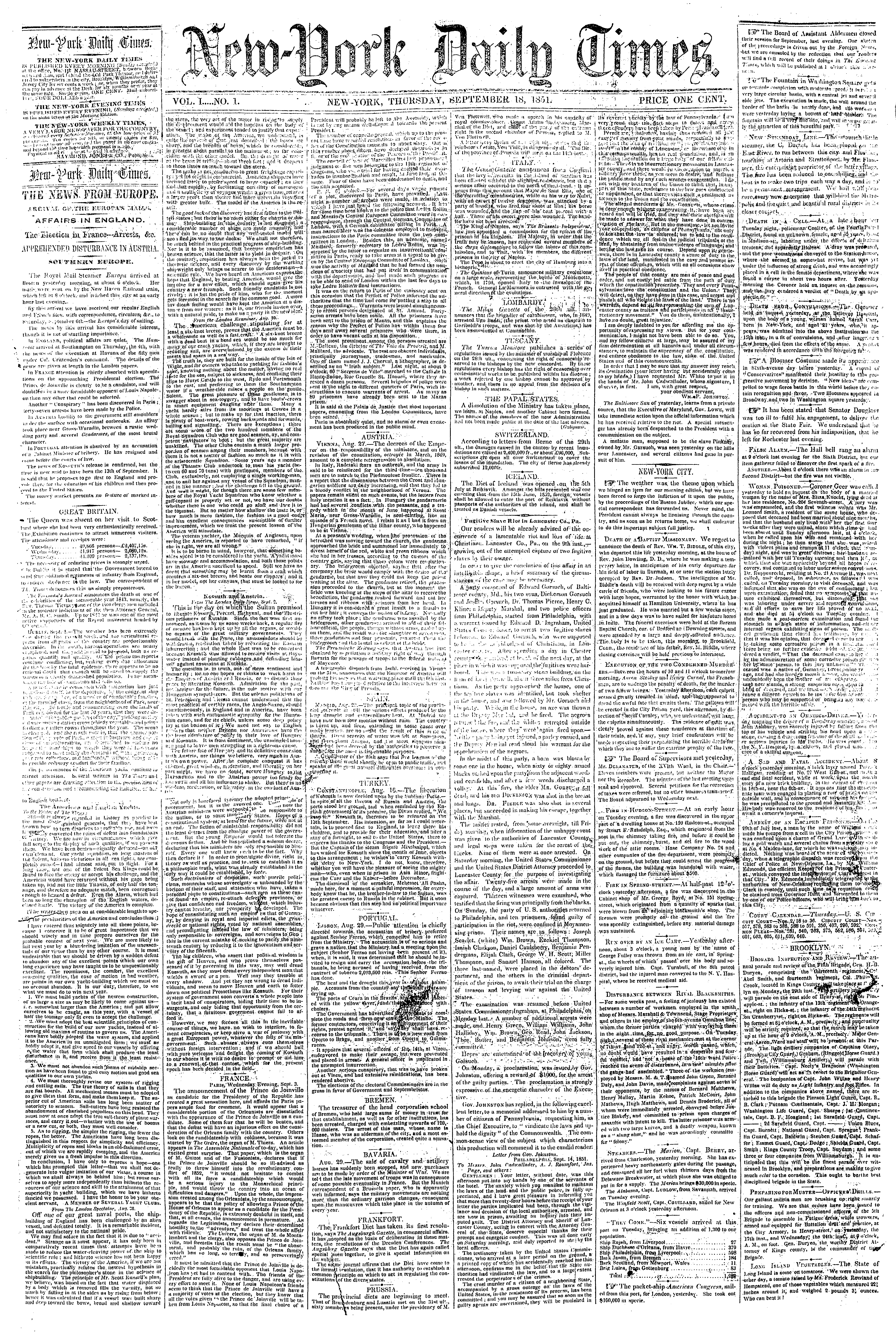
The first issue of The New York Times—initially called the New-York Daily Times—was published on Thursday, September 18, 1851. The name was changed in 1857 to The New-York Times after the evening edition was suspended, and the hyphen was dropped in 1896.

The New York Times was established in 1851 as the New-York Daily Times by New-York Tribune journalists Henry Jarvis Raymond and George Jones.

Financier Edward B. Wesley is credited as the third co-founder, in his capacity as the original business manager and the provider of half the starting capital. Wesley sold his interest in the newspaper in 1860.

The Times experienced significant circulation, particularly among conservatives; New-York Tribune publisher Horace Greeley praised the Times. During the American Civil War, Times correspondents gathered information directly from Confederate states. In 1869, Jones inherited the paper from Raymond, who had changed its name to The New-York Times. Under Jones, the Times began to publish a series of articles criticizing Tammany Hall political boss William M. Tweed, despite vehement opposition from other New York newspapers. In 1871, The New-York Times published Tammany Hall's accounting books; Tweed was tried in 1873 and sentenced to twelve years in prison. The Times earned national recognition for its coverage of Tweed. In 1891, Jones died, creating a management imbroglio in which his children had insufficient business acumen to inherit the company and his will prevented an acquisition of the Times. Editor-in-chief Charles Ransom Miller, editorial editor Edward Cary, and correspondent George F. Spinney established a company to manage The New-York Times, but faced financial difficulties during the Panic of 1893.

=== 1896–1945 ===
In August 1896, Chattanooga Times publisher Adolph Ochs acquired The New-York Times, implementing significant alterations to the newspaper's structure. Ochs established the Times as a merchant's newspaper and removed the hyphen from the newspaper's name. In 1905, The New York Times opened Times Tower, marking expansion. The Times experienced a political realignment in the 1910s amid several disagreements within the Republican Party. The New York Times reported on the sinking of the Titanic, as other newspapers were cautious about bulletins circulated by the Associated Press. Through managing editor Carr Van Anda, the Times paid considerable attention to advances in science, reporting on Albert Einstein's then-obscure theory of general relativity and becoming involved in the discovery of the tomb of Tutankhamun. In April 1935, Ochs died, leaving his son-in-law Arthur Hays Sulzberger as publisher. The Great Depression forced Sulzberger to reduce The New York Times's operations, and developments in the New York newspaper landscape resulted in the formation of larger newspapers, such as the New York Herald Tribune and the New York World-Telegram. In contrast to Ochs, Sulzberger encouraged wirephotography.

The New York Times extensively covered World War II through large headlines, reporting on exclusive stories such as the Yugoslav coup d'état. Amid the war, Sulzberger began expanding the Times's operations further, acquiring WQXR-FM in 1944—the first non-Times investment since the Jones era—and established a fashion show in Times Hall. Despite reductions as a result of conscription, The New York Times retained the largest journalism staff of any newspaper. The Times's print edition became available internationally during the war through the Army & Air Force Exchange Service; The New York Times Overseas Weekly later became available in Japan through The Asahi Shimbun and in Germany through the Frankfurter Zeitung. The international edition would develop into a separate newspaper. Journalist William L. Laurence publicized the atomic bomb race between the United States and Germany, resulting in the Federal Bureau of Investigation seizing copies of the Times. The United States government recruited Laurence to document the Manhattan Project in April 1945. Laurence became the only witness of the Manhattan Project, a detail realized by employees of The New York Times following the atomic bombing of Hiroshima.

=== 1945–1998 ===
Following World War II, The New York Times continued to expand. The Times was subject to investigations from the Senate Internal Security Subcommittee, a McCarthyist subcommittee that investigated purported communism from within press institutions. Arthur Hays Sulzberger's decision to dismiss a copyreader who had pleaded the Fifth Amendment drew ire from within the Times and from external organizations. In April 1961, Sulzberger resigned, appointing his son-in-law, The New York Times Company president Orvil Dryfoos. Under Dryfoos, The New York Times established a newspaper based in Los Angeles. In 1962, the implementation of automated printing presses in response to increasing costs mounted fears over technological unemployment. The New York Typographical Union staged a strike in December, altering the media consumption of New Yorkers. The strike left New York with three remaining newspapers—the Times, the Daily News, and the New York Post—by its conclusion in March 1963. In May, Dryfoos died of a heart ailment. Following weeks of ambiguity, Arthur Ochs Sulzberger became The New York Times's publisher.

Technological advancements leveraged by newspapers such as the Los Angeles Times and improvements in coverage from The Washington Post and The Wall Street Journal necessitated adaptations to nascent computing. The New York Times published "Heed Their Rising Voices" in 1960, a full-page advertisement purchased by supporters of Martin Luther King Jr. criticizing law enforcement in Montgomery, Alabama for their response to the civil rights movement. Montgomery Public Safety commissioner L. B. Sullivan sued the Times for defamation. In New York Times Co. v. Sullivan (1964), the U.S. Supreme Court ruled that the verdict in Alabama county court and the Supreme Court of Alabama violated the First Amendment. The decision is considered to be a landmark. After financial losses, The New York Times ended its international edition, acquiring a stake in the Paris Herald Tribune, forming the International Herald Tribune. The Times initially published the Pentagon Papers, facing opposition from then-president Richard Nixon. The Supreme Court ruled in The New York Times's favor in New York Times Co. v. United States (1971), allowing the Times and The Washington Post to publish the papers.

The New York Times remained cautious in its initial coverage of the Watergate scandal. As Congress began investigating the scandal, the Times furthered its coverage, publishing details on the Huston Plan, alleged wiretapping of reporters and officials, and testimony from James W. McCord Jr. that the Committee for the Re-Election of the President paid the conspirators off. The exodus of readers to suburban New York newspapers, such as Newsday and Gannett papers, adversely affected The New York Times's circulation. Contemporary newspapers balked at additional sections; Time devoted a cover for its criticism and New York wrote that the Times was engaging in "middle-class self-absorption". The New York Times, the Daily News, and the New York Post were the subject of a strike in 1978, allowing emerging newspapers to leverage halted coverage. The Times deliberately avoided coverage of the AIDS epidemic, running its first front-page article in May 1983. Max Frankel's editorial coverage of the epidemic, with mentions of anal intercourse, contrasted with then-executive editor A. M. Rosenthal's puritan approach, intentionally avoiding descriptions of the luridity of gay venues.

Following years of waning interest in The New York Times, Sulzberger resigned in January 1992, appointing his son, Arthur Ochs Sulzberger Jr., as publisher. The Internet represented a generational shift within the Times; Sulzberger, who negotiated The New York Times Company's acquisition of The Boston Globe in 1993, derided the Internet, while his son expressed antithetical views. @times appeared on America Online's website in May 1994 as an extension of The New York Times, featuring news articles, film reviews, sports news, and business articles. Despite opposition, several employees of the Times had begun to access the Internet. The online success of publications that traditionally co-existed with the Times—such as America Online, Yahoo, and CNN—and the expansion of websites such as Monster.com and Craigslist that threatened The New York Times's classified advertisement model increased efforts to develop a website. nytimes.com debuted on January 19 and was formally announced three days later. The Times published domestic terrorist Ted Kaczynski's essay Industrial Society and Its Future in 1995, contributing to his arrest after his brother David recognized the essay's penmanship.

=== 1998–present ===
Following the establishment of nytimes.com, The New York Times retained its journalistic hesitancy under executive editor Joseph Lelyveld, refusing to publish an article reporting on the Clinton–Lewinsky scandal from Drudge Report. nytimes.com editors conflicted with print editors on several occasions, including wrongfully naming security guard Richard Jewell as the suspect in the Centennial Olympic Park bombing and covering the death of Diana, Princess of Wales in greater detail than the print edition. The New York Times Electronic Media Company was adversely affected by the dot-com crash. The Times extensively covered the September 11 attacks. The following day's print issue contained sixty-six articles, the work of over three hundred dispatched reporters. Journalist Judith Miller was the recipient of a package containing a white powder during the 2001 anthrax attacks, furthering anxiety within The New York Times. In September 2002, Miller and military correspondent Michael R. Gordon wrote an article for the Times claiming that Iraq had purchased aluminum tubes. The article was cited by then-president George W. Bush to claim that Iraq was constructing weapons of mass destruction; the theoretical use of aluminum tubes to produce nuclear material was speculation. In March 2003, the United States invaded Iraq, beginning the Iraq War.

The New York Times attracted controversy after thirty-six articles from journalist Jayson Blair were discovered to be plagiarized. Criticism over then-executive editor Howell Raines and then-managing editor Gerald M. Boyd mounted following the scandal, culminating in a town hall in which a deputy editor criticized Raines for failing to question Blair's sources in article he wrote on the D.C. sniper attacks. In June 2003, Raines and Boyd resigned. Arthur Ochs Sulzberger Jr. appointed Bill Keller as executive editor. Miller continued to report on the Iraq War as a journalistic embed covering the country's weapons of mass destruction program. Keller and then-Washington bureau chief Jill Abramson unsuccessfully attempted to quell criticism. Conservative media criticized the Times over its coverage of missing explosives from the Al Qa'qaa weapons facility. An article in December 2005 disclosing warrantless surveillance by the National Security Agency contributed to further criticism from the George W. Bush administration and the Senate's refusal to renew the Patriot Act. In the Plame affair, a Central Intelligence Agency inquiry found that Miller had become aware of Valerie Plame's identity through then-vice president Dick Cheney's chief of staff Scooter Libby, resulting in Miller's resignation.

During the Great Recession, The New York Times suffered significant fiscal difficulties as a consequence of the subprime mortgage crisis and a decline in classified advertising. Exacerbated by Rupert Murdoch's revitalization of The Wall Street Journal through his acquisition of Dow Jones & Company, The New York Times Company began enacting measures to reduce the newsroom budget. The company was forced to borrow $250 million (equivalent to $373.84 million in 2025) from Mexican billionaire Carlos Slim and fired over one hundred employees by 2010. nytimes.com's coverage of the Eliot Spitzer prostitution scandal, resulting in the resignation of then-New York governor Eliot Spitzer, furthered the legitimacy of the website as a journalistic medium. The Times's economic downturn renewed discussions of an online paywall; The New York Times implemented a paywall in March 2011. Abramson succeeded Keller, continuing her characteristic investigations into corporate and government malfeasance into the Times's coverage. Following conflicts with newly appointed chief executive Mark Thompson's ambitions, Abramson was dismissed by Sulzberger Jr., who named Dean Baquet as her replacement.

Leading up to the 2016 presidential election, The New York Times elevated the Hillary Clinton email controversy into a national issue. Donald Trump's upset victory contributed to an increase in subscriptions to the Times. The New York Times experienced unprecedented indignation from Trump, who referred to publications such as the Times as "enemies of the people" at the Conservative Political Action Conference and tweeted his disdain for the newspaper and CNN. In October 2017, The New York Times published an article by journalists Jodi Kantor and Megan Twohey alleging that dozens of women had accused film producer and The Weinstein Company co-chairman Harvey Weinstein of sexual misconduct. The investigation resulted in Weinstein's resignation and conviction, precipitated the Weinstein effect, and served as a catalyst for the #MeToo movement. The New York Times Company vacated the public editor position and eliminated the copy desk in November. Sulzberger Jr. announced his resignation in December 2017, appointing his son, A. G. Sulzberger, as publisher.

Trump's relationship—equally diplomatic and negative—marked Sulzberger's tenure. In September 2018, The New York Times published "I Am Part of the Resistance Inside the Trump Administration", an anonymous essay by a self-described Trump administration official later revealed to be Department of Homeland Security chief of staff Miles Taylor. The animosity—which extended to nearly three hundred instances of Trump disparaging the Times by May 2019—culminated in Trump ordering federal agencies to cancel their subscriptions to The New York Times and The Washington Post in October 2019. Trump's tax returns have been the subject of three separate investigations. (Note: Attributed to multiple references:) During the COVID-19 pandemic, the Times began implementing data services and graphs. On May 23, 2020, The New York Times's front page solely featured U.S. Deaths Near 100,000, An Incalculable Loss, a subset of the 100,000 people in the United States who died of COVID-19, the first time that the Times's front page lacked images since they were introduced. Since 2020, The New York Times has focused on broader diversification, developing online games and producing television series. The New York Times Company acquired The Athletic in January 2022.

== Organization ==
=== Management ===
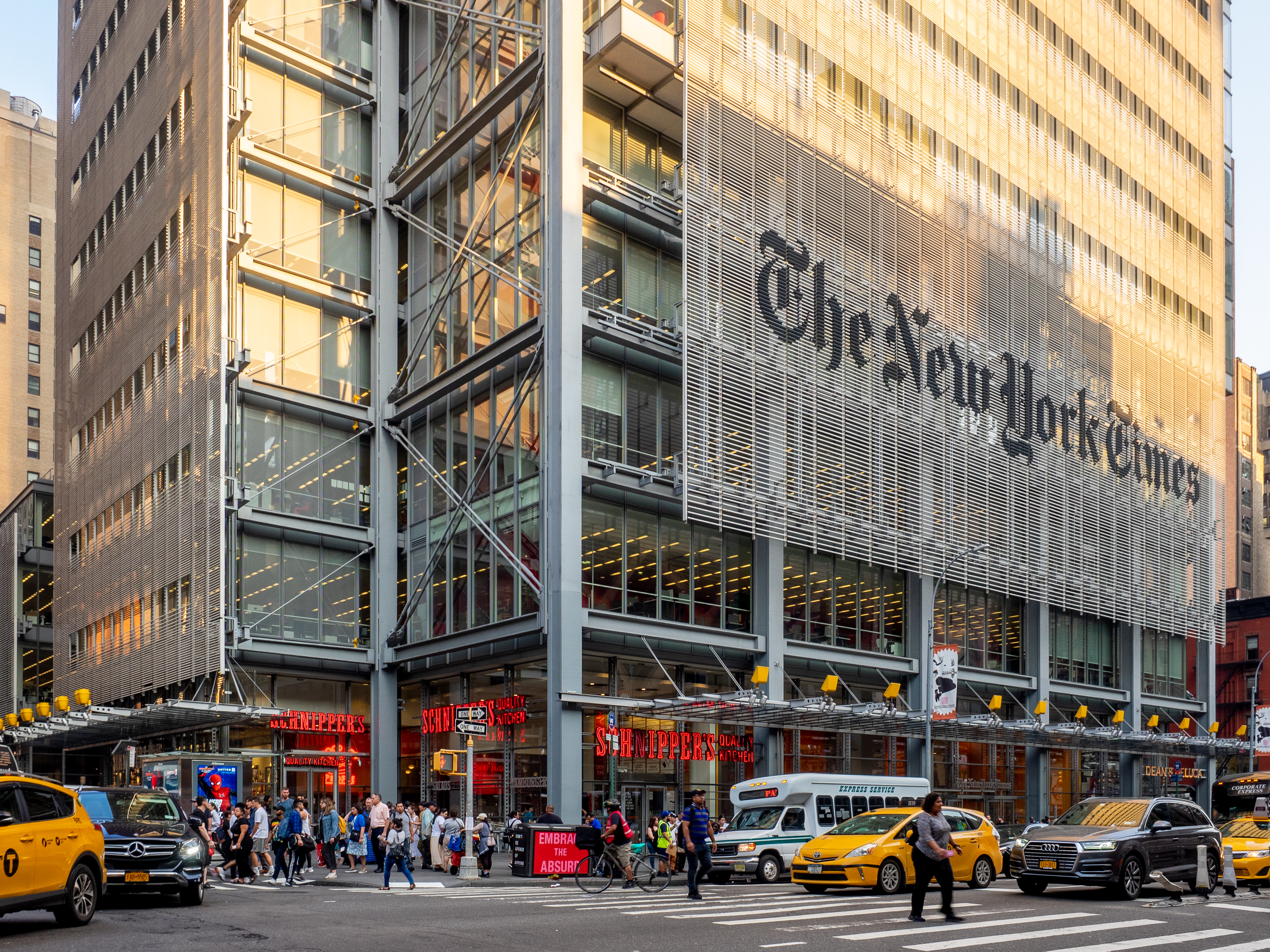
The New York Times Building in Midtown Manhattan, New York

Since 1896, The New York Times has been published by the Ochs-Sulzberger family, having previously been published by Henry Jarvis Raymond until 1869 and by George Jones until 1896. Adolph Ochs published the Times until his death in 1935, when he was succeeded by his son-in-law, Arthur Hays Sulzberger. Sulzberger was publisher until 1961 and was succeeded by Orvil Dryfoos, his son-in-law, who served in the position until his death in 1963. Arthur Ochs Sulzberger succeeded Dryfoos until his resignation in 1992. His son, Arthur Ochs Sulzberger Jr., served as publisher until 2018. The New York Times's current publisher is A. G. Sulzberger, Sulzberger Jr.'s son. As of 2023, the Times's executive editor is Joseph Kahn and the paper's managing editors are Marc Lacey and Carolyn Ryan, having been appointed in June 2022. The New York Times's deputy managing editors are Sam Dolnick, Monica Drake, and Steve Duenes, and the paper's assistant managing editors are Matthew Ericson, Jonathan Galinsky, Hannah Poferl, Sam Sifton, Karron Skog, and Michael Slackman.

The New York Times is owned by The New York Times Company, a publicly traded company. The New York Times Company, in addition to the Times, owns Wirecutter, The Athletic, The New York Times Cooking, and The New York Times Games, and acquired Serial Productions and Audm. The New York Times Company holds undisclosed minority investments in multiple other businesses, and formerly owned The Boston Globe and several radio and television stations. The New York Times Company is majority-owned by the Ochs-Sulzberger family through elevated shares in the company's dual-class stock structure held largely in a trust, in effect since the 1950s; as of 2022, the family holds 95% of The New York Times Company's Class B shares, allowing it to elect 70% of the company's board of directors. Class A shareholders have restrictive voting rights. As of 2023, The New York Times Company's chief executive is Meredith Kopit Levien, the company's former chief operating officer who was appointed in September 2020.

=== Journalists ===
As of March 2023, The New York Times Company employs 5,800 individuals, including 1,700 journalists according to deputy managing editor Sam Dolnick. Journalists for The New York Times may not run for public office, provide financial support to political candidates or causes, endorse candidates, or demonstrate public support for causes or movements. Journalists are subject to the guidelines established in "Ethical Journalism" and "Guidelines on Integrity". According to the former, Times journalists must abstain from using sources with a personal relationship to them and must not accept reimbursements or inducements from individuals who may be written about in The New York Times, with exceptions for gifts of nominal value. The latter requires attribution and exact quotations, though exceptions are made for linguistic anomalies. Staff writers are expected to ensure the veracity of all written claims, but may delegate researching obscure facts to the research desk. In March 2021, the Times established a committee to avoid journalistic conflicts of interest with work written for The New York Times, following columnist David Brooks's resignation from the Aspen Institute for his undisclosed work on the initiative Weave.

Bureaus of The New York Times
Location	Chief
Afghanistan and Pakistan	Christina Goldbaum
Albany, New York, United States	Luis Ferré-Sadurní
Atlanta, Georgia, United States	Rick Rojas
(Argentina) Andes, South America	Julie Turkewitz
Baghdad, Iraq	—N/a
Brazil	Jack Nicas
Brussels, Belgium	Matina Stevis-Gridneff
Beijing, China	Keith Bradsher
Berlin, Germany	Katrin Bennhold
Cairo, Egypt	Vivian Yee
Chicago, Illinois, United States	Julie Bosman
(Poland) Eastern and Central Europe (Note: Based in Warsaw, Poland)	Andrew Higgins
Ho Chi Minh City, Vietnam	Damien Cave
Houston, Texas, United States	J. David Goodman
Istanbul, Turkey	Ben Hubbard
Kyiv, Ukraine	Andrew Kramer
Jerusalem, Israel	Patrick Kingsley
Johannesburg, South Africa	John Eligon
(United Kingdom) London, England	Mark Landler
Los Angeles, California, United States	Corina Knoll
(United States) Miami, Florida	Patricia Mazzei
Mid-Atlantic, United States (Note: Based in Washington, D.C.)	Campbell Robertson
Moscow, Russia	Paul Sonne
Mexico City, Mexico	Natalie Kitroeff
New England, United States	Jenna Russell
New York City Hall, New York, United States	Emma Fitzsimmons
New York Police Department, New York, United States	Maria Cramer
Paris, France	Roger Cohen
(Saudi Arabia) Persian Gulf (Note: Based in Riyadh, Saudi Arabia)	Vivian Nereim
Rome, Italy	Jason Horowitz
San Francisco, California, United States	Heather Knight
Seattle, Washington, United States	Mike Baker
(India) South Asia (Note: Based in New Delhi, India)	Mujib Mashal
(Thailand) Southeast Asia (Note: Based in Bangkok, Thailand)	Sui-Lee Wee
Seoul, South Korea	Choe Sang-Hun
Shanghai, China	Alexandra Stevenson
Sydney, Australia	Victoria Kim
Tokyo, Japan	Motoko Rich
United Nations	Farnaz Fassihi
Washington, D.C., United States	Dick Stevenson
(Senegal) West Africa (Note: Based in Dakar, Senegal)	Ruth Maclean

=== Editorial board ===
The New York Times
editorial board
- Binyamin Appelbaum
- Michelle Cottle
- David Firestone
- Nick Fox
- Mara Gay
- Jeneen Interlandi
- Lauren Kelley
- Kathleen Kingsbury
- Serge Schmemann
- Brent Staples
- Farah Stockman
- Jyoti Thottam
- Jesse Wegman

The New York Times editorial board was established in 1896 by Adolph Ochs. With the opinion department, the editorial board is independent of the newsroom. Then-editor-in-chief Charles Ransom Miller served as opinion editor from 1883 until his death in 1922. Rollo Ogden succeeded Miller until his death in 1937. From 1937 to 1938, John Huston Finley served as opinion editor; in a prearranged plan, Charles Merz succeeded Finley. Merz served in the position until his retirement in 1961. John Bertram Oakes served as opinion editor from 1961 to 1976, when then-publisher Arthur Ochs Sulzberger appointed Max Frankel. Frankel served in the position until 1986, when he was appointed as executive editor. Jack Rosenthal was the opinion editor from 1986 to 1993. Howell Raines succeeded Rosenthal until 2001, when he was made executive editor. Gail Collins succeeded Raines until her resignation in 2006. From 2007 to 2016, Andrew Rosenthal was the opinion editor. James Bennet succeeded Rosenthal until his resignation in 2020. As of July 2024, the editorial board comprises thirteen opinion writers. The New York Times's opinion editor is Kathleen Kingsbury and the deputy opinion editor is Patrick Healy.

The New York Times's editorial board was initially opposed to liberal beliefs, opposing women's suffrage in 1900 and 1914. The editorial board began to espouse progressive beliefs during Oakes's tenure, conflicting with the Ochs-Sulzberger family, of which Oakes was a member as Adolph Ochs's nephew; in 1976, Oakes publicly disagreed with Sulzberger's endorsement of Daniel Patrick Moynihan over Bella Abzug in the 1976 Senate Democratic primaries in a letter sent from Martha's Vineyard. Under Rosenthal, the editorial board took positions supporting assault weapons legislation and the legalization of marijuana, but publicly criticized the Obama administration over its portrayal of terrorism. In presidential elections, The New York Times has endorsed a total of twelve Republican candidates and thirty-two Democratic candidates, and has endorsed the Democrat in every election since 1960. (Note: In 1896, the Times endorsed John M. Palmer, the National Democratic Party nominee, its only endorsement for a candidate who is not a member of the Republican Party or the Democratic Party.) With the exception of Wendell Willkie, Republicans endorsed by the Times have won the presidency. In 2016, the editorial board issued an anti-endorsement against Donald Trump for the first time in its history. In February 2020, the editorial board reduced its presence from several editorials each day to occasional editorials for events deemed particularly significant. Since August 2024, the board no longer endorses candidates in local or congressional races in New York.

=== Unionization ===
Since 1940, editorial, media, and technology workers of The New York Times have been represented by the New York Times Guild. The Times Guild, along with the Times Tech Guild, are represented by the NewsGuild-CWA. In 1940, Arthur Hays Sulzberger was called upon by the National Labor Relations Board amid accusations that he had discouraged Guild membership in the Times. Over the next few years, the Guild would ratify several contracts, expanding to editorial and news staff in 1942 and maintenance workers in 1943.

The New York Times Guild has walked out several times in its history, including for six and a half hours in 1981 and in 2017, when copy editors and reporters walked out at lunchtime in response to the elimination of the copy desk. On December 7, 2022, the union held a one-day strike, the first interruption to The New York Times since 1978. The New York Times Guild reached an agreement in May 2023 to increase minimum salaries for employees and a retroactive bonus. The Times Tech Guild is the largest technology union with collective bargaining rights in the United States. The guild held a second strike beginning on November 4, 2024, threatening the Times's coverage of the 2024 United States presidential election.

== Content ==
=== Circulation ===
As of June 2026, The New York Times has 13.35 million subscribers, with 12.8 million digital subscribers and 550,000 print subscribers. The New York Times Company is targeting 15 million subscribers by 2027. The Times's shift towards subscription-based revenue with the debut of an online paywall in 2011 contributed to subscription revenue exceeding advertising revenue the following year, furthered by the 2016 presidential election and Donald Trump. In 2022, Vox wrote that The New York Times's subscribers skew "older, richer, whiter, and more liberal"; to reflect the general population of the United States, the Times has attempted to alter its audience by acquiring The Athletic, investing in verticals such as The New York Times Games, and beginning a marketing campaign showing diverse subscribers to the Times. The New York Times Company chief executive Meredith Kopit Levien stated that the average age of subscribers has remained constant.

=== Newsletters ===
In October 2001, The New York Times began publishing DealBook, a financial newsletter edited by Andrew Ross Sorkin. The Times had intended to publish the newsletter in September, but delayed its debut following the September 11 attacks. A website for DealBook was established in March 2006. The New York Times began shifting towards DealBook as part of the newspaper's financial coverage in November 2010 with a renewed website and a presence in the Times's print edition. In 2011, the Times began hosting the DealBook Summit, an annual conference hosted by Sorkin. During the COVID-19 pandemic, The New York Times hosted the DealBook Online Summit in 2020 and 2021. The 2022 DealBook Summit featured—among other speakers—former vice president Mike Pence and Israeli prime minister Benjamin Netanyahu, culminating in an interview with former FTX chief executive Sam Bankman-Fried; FTX had filed for bankruptcy several weeks prior. The 2023 DealBook Summit's speakers included vice president Kamala Harris, Israeli president Isaac Herzog, and businessman Elon Musk.

In June 2010, The New York Times licensed the political blog FiveThirtyEight in a three-year agreement. The blog, written by Nate Silver, had garnered attention during the 2008 presidential election for predicting the elections in forty-nine of fifty states. FiveThirtyEight appeared on nytimes.com in August. According to Silver, several offers were made for the blog; Silver wrote that a merger of unequals must allow for editorial sovereignty and resources from the acquirer, comparing himself to Groucho Marx. According to The New Republic, FiveThirtyEight drew as much as a fifth of the traffic to nytimes.com during the 2012 presidential election. In July 2013, FiveThirtyEight was sold to ESPN. In an article following Silver's exit, public editor Margaret Sullivan wrote that he was disruptive to the Times's culture for his perspective on probability-based predictions and scorn for polling—having stated that punditry is "fundamentally useless", comparing him to Billy Beane, who implemented sabermetrics in baseball. According to Sullivan, his work was criticized by several notable political journalists.

The New Republic obtained a memo in November 2013 revealing then-Washington bureau chief David Leonhardt's ambitions to establish a data-driven newsletter with presidential historian Michael Beschloss, graphic designer Amanda Cox, economist Justin Wolfers, and The New Republic journalist Nate Cohn. By March, Leonhardt had amassed fifteen employees from within The New York Times; the newsletter's staff included individuals who had created the Times's dialect quiz, fourth down analyzer, and a calculator for determining buying or renting a home. The Upshot debuted in April 2014. Fast Company reviewed an article about Illinois Secure Choice—a state-funded retirement saving system—as "neither a terse news item, nor a formal financial advice column, nor a politically charged response to economic policy", citing its informal and neutral tone. The Upshot developed "the needle" for the 2016 presidential election and 2020 presidential elections, a thermometer dial displaying the probability of a candidate winning. In January 2016, Cox was named editor of The Upshot. Kevin Quealy was named editor in June 2022.

=== Political positions ===
The New York Times has said it is perceived as a liberal newspaper. An analysis by Pew Research Center in October 2014 placed the Times readership as ideologically liberal based on a scale of 10 political values questions. According to an internal readership poll conducted by The New York Times in 2019, 84% of readers identified as liberal. The New York Times has struggled internally with how to balance its coverage, dismissing criticism from the left for "sanewashing" right-wing viewpoints in its coverage of Donald Trump.

In covering Israel's war on the Gaza Strip that began in 2023, The New York Times instructed its reporters to restrict use of the terms 'Palestine', 'genocide', and 'refugee camps' to specific usages, with data analysis showing a pattern of articles emphasizing Israeli civilians killed by Palestinians over a much larger number of Palestinian civilians killed by Israelis. The group Writers Against the War on Gaza wrote in the blog Mondoweiss that this has contrasted with The New York Times coverage of Russia's invasion of Ukraine, in which Russia is considered a threat to U.S. foreign policy interests, while Israel is considered an ally.

=== Crossword ===
In February 1942, The New York Times crossword debuted in The New York Times Magazine; according to Richard Shepard, the attack on Pearl Harbor in December 1941 convinced then-publisher Arthur Hays Sulzberger of the necessity of a crossword, since he believed Americans would need something to occupy themselves with during blackouts caused by air raids.

=== Cooking ===
The New York Times has published recipes since the 1850s and has had a separate food section since the 1940s. In 1961, restaurant critic Craig Claiborne published The New York Times Cookbook, an unauthorized cookbook that drew from the Times's recipes. Since 2010, former food editor Amanda Hesser has published The Essential New York Times Cookbook, a compendium of recipes from The New York Times. The Innovation Report in 2014 revealed that the Times had attempted to establish a cooking website since 1998, but faced difficulties with the absence of a defined data structure. In September 2014, The New York Times introduced NYT Cooking, an application and website. Edited by food editor Sam Sifton, the Times's cooking website features 21,000 recipes as of 2022. NYT Cooking features videos as part of an effort by Sifton to hire two former Tasty employees from BuzzFeed. In August 2023, NYT Cooking added personalized recommendations through the cosine similarity of text embeddings of recipe titles. The website also features no-recipe recipes, a concept proposed by Sifton.

In May 2016, The New York Times Company announced a partnership with startup Chef'd to form a meal delivery service that would deliver ingredients from The New York Times Cooking recipes to subscribers; Chef'd shut down in July 2018 after failing to accrue capital and secure financing. The Hollywood Reporter reported in September 2022 that the Times would expand its delivery options to US$95 cooking kits curated by chefs such as Nina Compton, Chintan Pandya, and Naoko Takei Moore. That month, the staff of NYT Cooking went on tour with Compton, Pandya, and Moore in Los Angeles, New Orleans, and New York City, culminating in a food festival. In addition, The New York Times offered its own wine club originally operated by the Global Wine Company. The New York Times Wine Club was established in August 2009, during a dramatic decrease in advertising revenue. By 2021, the wine club was managed by Lot18, a company that provides proprietary labels. Lot18 managed the Williams Sonoma Wine Club and its own wine club Tasting Room.

=== Archives ===
The New York Times archives its articles in a basement annex beneath its building known as "the morgue", a venture started by managing editor Carr Van Anda in 1907. The morgue comprises news clippings, a pictures library, and the Times's book and periodicals library. As of 2014, it is the largest library of any media company, dating back to 1851. In November 2018, The New York Times partnered with Google to digitize the Archival Library. Additionally, The New York Times has maintained a virtual microfilm reader known as TimesMachine since 2014. The service launched with archives from 1851 to 1980; in 2016, TimesMachine expanded to include archives from 1981 to 2002. The Times built a pipeline to take in TIFF images, article metadata in XML and an INI file of Cartesian geometry describing the boundaries of the page, and convert it into a PNG of image tiles and JSON containing the information in the XML and INI files. The image tiles are generated using GDAL and displayed using Leaflet, using data from a content delivery network. The Times ran optical character recognition on the articles using Tesseract and shingled and fuzzy string matched the result.

=== Content management system ===
The New York Times uses a proprietary content management system known as Scoop for its online content and the Microsoft Word-based content management system CCI for its print content. Scoop was developed in 2008 to serve as a secondary content management system for editors working in CCI to publish their content on the Times's website; as part of The New York Times's online endeavors, editors now write their content in Scoop and send their work to CCI for print publication. Since its introduction, Scoop has superseded several processes within the Times, including print edition planning and collaboration, and features tools such as multimedia integration, notifications, content tagging, and drafts. The New York Times uses private articles for high-profile opinion pieces, such as those written by Russian president Vladimir Putin and actress Angelina Jolie, and for high-level investigations. In January 2012, the Times released Integrated Content Editor (ICE), a revision tracking tool for WordPress and TinyMCE. ICE is integrated within the Times's workflow by providing a unified text editor for print and online editors, reducing the divide between print and online operations.

By 2017, The New York Times began developing a new authoring tool to its content management system known as Oak, in an attempt to further the Times's visual efforts in articles and reduce the discrepancy between the mediums in print and online articles. The system reduces the input of editors and supports additional visual mediums in an editor that resembles the appearance of the article. Oak is based on ProseMirror, a JavaScript rich-text editor toolkit, and retains the revision tracking and commenting functionalities of The New York Times's previous systems. Additionally, Oak supports predefined article headers. In 2019, Oak was updated to support collaborative editing using Firebase to update editors's cursor status. Several Google Cloud Functions and Google Cloud Tasks allow articles to be previewed as they will be printed, and the Times's primary MySQL database is regularly updated to update editors on the article status.

== Style and design ==
=== Style guide ===
Since 1895, The New York Times has maintained a manual of style in several forms. The New York Times Manual of Style and Usage was published on the Times's intranet in 1999.

The New York Times uses honorifics when referring to individuals. With the AP Stylebook's removal of honorifics in 2000 and The Wall Street Journal's omission of courtesy titles in May 2023, the Times is the only national newspaper that continues to use honorifics. According to former copy editor Merrill Perlman, The New York Times continues to use honorifics as a "sign of civility". The Times's use of courtesy titles led to an apocryphal rumor that the paper had referred to singer Meat Loaf as "Mr. Loaf". Several exceptions have been made; the former sports section and The New York Times Book Review do not use honorifics. A leaked memo following the killing of Osama bin Laden in May 2011 revealed that editors were given a last-minute instruction to omit the honorific from Osama bin Laden's name, consistent with deceased figures of historic significance, such as Adolf Hitler, Napoleon, and Vladimir Lenin. The New York Times uses academic and military titles for individuals prominently serving in that position. In 1986, the Times began to use Ms, and introduced the gender-neutral title Mx. in 2015. The New York Times uses initials when a subject has expressed a preference, such as Donald Trump.

The New York Times maintains a strict but not absolute obscenity policy, including phrases. In a review of the Canadian hardcore punk band Fucked Up, music critic Kelefa Sanneh wrote that the band's name—entirely rendered in asterisks—would not be printed in the Times "unless an American president, or someone similar, says it by mistake"; The New York Times did not repeat then-vice president Dick Cheney's use of "fuck" against then-senator Patrick Leahy in 2004 or then-vice president Joe Biden's remarks that the passage of the Affordable Care Act in 2010 was a "big fucking deal". The Times's profanity policy has been tested by former president Donald Trump. The New York Times published Trump's Access Hollywood tape in October 2016, containing the words "fuck", "pussy", "bitch", and "tits", the first time the publication had published an expletive on its front page, and repeated an explicit phrase for fellatio stated by then-White House communications director Anthony Scaramucci in July 2017. The New York Times omitted Trump's use of the phrase "shithole countries" from its headline in favor of "vulgar language" in January 2018. The Times banned certain words, such as "bitch", "whore", and "sluts", from Wordle in 2022.

=== Headlines ===
Journalists for The New York Times do not write their own headlines, but rather copy editors who specifically write headlines. The Times's guidelines insist headline editors get to the main point of an article but avoid giving away endings, if present. Other guidelines include using slang "sparingly", avoiding tabloid headlines, not ending a line on a preposition, article, or adjective, and chiefly, not to pun. The New York Times Manual of Style and Usage states that wordplay, such as "Rubber Industry Bounces Back", is to be tested on a colleague as a canary is to be tested in a coal mine; "when no song bursts forth, start rewriting". The New York Times has amended headlines due to controversy. In 2019, following two back-to-back mass shootings in El Paso and Dayton, the Times used the headline, "Trump Urges Unity vs. Racism", to describe then-president Donald Trump's words after the shootings. After criticism from FiveThirtyEight founder Nate Silver, the headline was changed to, "Assailing Hate But Not Guns".

Online, The New York Times's headlines do not face the same length restrictions as headlines that appear in print; print headlines must fit within a column, often six words. Additionally, headlines must "break" properly, containing a complete thought on each line without splitting up prepositions and adverbs. Writers may edit a headline to fit an article more aptly if further developments occur. The Times uses A/B testing for articles on the front page, placing two headlines against each other. At the end of the test, the headlines that receives more traffic is chosen. The alteration of a headline regarding intercepted Russian data used in the Mueller special counsel investigation was noted by Trump in a March 2017 interview with Time, in which he claimed that the headline used the word "wiretapped" in the print version of the paper on January 20, while the digital article on January 19 omitted the word. The headline was intentionally changed in the print version to use "wiretapped" in order to fit within the print guidelines.

=== Nameplate ===
The nameplate of The New York Times has been unaltered since 1967. In creating the initial nameplate, Henry Jarvis Raymond took as his model the British newspaper The Times, which used a Blackletter style called Textura, popularized following the fall of the Western Roman Empire and regional variations of Alcuin's script, as well as a period. With the change to The New-York Times on September 14, 1857, the nameplate followed. Under George Jones, the terminals of the "N", "r", and "s" were intentionally exaggerated into swashes. The nameplate in the January 15, 1894, issue trimmed the terminals once more, smoothed the edges, and turned the stem supporting the "T" into an ornament. The hyphen was dropped on December 1, 1896, after Adolph Ochs purchased the paper. The descender of the "h" was shortened on December 30, 1914. The largest change to the nameplate was introduced on February 21, 1967, when type designer Ed Benguiat redesigned the logo, most prominently turning the arrow ornament into a diamond. Notoriously, the new logo dropped the period that had followed the word Times up until that point; one reader compared the omission of the period to "performing plastic surgery on Helen of Troy." Picture editor John Radosta worked with a New York University professor to determine that dropping the period saved the paper US$41.28 (equivalent to $398.59 in 2025).

== Print edition ==
=== Design and layout ===
As of December 2023, The New York Times has printed sixty thousand issues, a statistic represented in the paper's masthead to the right of the volume number, the Times's years in publication written in Roman numerals. The volume and issues are separated by four dots representing the edition number of that issue; on the day of the 2000 presidential election, the Times was revised four separate times, necessitating the use of an em dash in place of an ellipsis. The em dash issue was printed hundreds times over before being replaced by the one-dot issue. Despite efforts by newsroom employees to recycle copies sent to The New York Times's office, several copies were kept, including one put on display at the Museum at The Times. From February 7, 1898, to December 31, 1999, the Times's issue number was incorrect by five hundred issues, an error suspected by The Atlantic to be the result of a careless front page type editor. The misreporting was noticed by news editor Aaron Donovan, who was calculating the number of issues in a spreadsheet and noticed the discrepancy. The New York Times celebrated fifty thousand issues on March 14, 1995, an observance that should have occurred on July 26, 1996.

The New York Times has reduced the physical size of its print edition while retaining its broadsheet format. The New-York Daily Times debuted at 18 inches (460 mm) across. By the 1950s, the Times was being printed at 16 inches (410 mm) across. In 1953, an increase in paper costs to US$10 (equivalent to $120.34 in 2025) a ton increased newsprint costs to US$21.7 million (equivalent to $326,110,074.63 in 2025). On December 28, 1953, the pages were reduced to 15.5 inches (390 mm). On February 14, 1955, a further reduction to 15 inches (380 mm) occurred, followed by 14.5 and 13.5 inches (370 and 340 mm). On August 6, 2007, the largest cut occurred when the pages were reduced to 12 inches (300 mm), (Note: The national edition of The New York Times uses 11.5 inches (290 mm) pages.) a decision that other broadsheets had previously considered. Then-executive editor Bill Keller stated that a narrower paper would be more beneficial to the reader but acknowledged a net loss in article space of 5%. In 1985, The New York Times Company established a minority stake in a US$21.7 million (equivalent to $326,110,074.63 in 2025) newsprint plant in Clermont, Quebec through Donahue Malbaie. The company sold its equity interest in Donahue Malbaie in 2017.

The New York Times often uses large, bolded headlines for major events. For the print version of the Times, these headlines are written by one copy editor, reviewed by two other copy editors, approved by the masthead editors, and polished by other print editors. The process is completed before 8 p.m., but it may be repeated if further development occur, as did take place during the 2020 presidential election. On the day Joe Biden was declared the winner, The New York Times utilized a "hammer headline" reading, "Biden Beats Trump", in all caps and bolded. A dozen journalists discussed several potential headlines, such as "It's Biden" or "Biden's Moment", and prepared for a Donald Trump victory, in which they would use "Trump Prevails". During Trump's first impeachment, the Times drafted the hammer headline, "Trump Impeached". The New York Times altered the ligatures between the E and the A, as not doing so would leave a noticeable gap due to the stem of the A sloping away from the E. The Times reused the tight kerning for "Biden Beats Trump" and Trump's second impeachment, which simply read, "Impeached".

In cases where two major events occur on the same day or immediately after each other, The New York Times has used a "paddle wheel" headline, where both headlines are used but split by a line. The term dates back to August 8, 1959, when it was revealed that the United States was monitoring Soviet missile firings and when Explorer 6—shaped like a paddle wheel—launched. Since then, the paddle wheel has been used several times, including on January 21, 1981, when Ronald Reagan was sworn in minutes before Iran released fifty-two American hostages, ending the Iran hostage crisis. At the time, most newspapers favored the end of the hostage crisis, but the Times placed the inauguration above the crisis. Other occasions in which the paddle wheel has been used include on July 26, 2000, when the 2000 Camp David Summit ended without an agreement and when Bush announced that Dick Cheney would be his running mate, and on June 24, 2016, when the United Kingdom European Union membership referendum passed, beginning Brexit, and when the Supreme Court deadlocked in United States v. Texas.

The New York Times has run editorials from its editorial board on the front page twice. On June 13, 1920, the Times ran an editorial opposing Warren G. Harding, who was nominated during that year's Republican Party presidential primaries. Amid growing acceptance to run editorials on the front pages from publications such as the Detroit Free Press, The Patriot-News, The Arizona Republic, and The Indianapolis Star, The New York Times ran an editorial on its front page on December 5, 2015, following a terrorist attack in San Bernardino, California, in which fourteen people were killed. The editorial advocates for the prohibition of "slightly modified combat rifles" used in the San Bernardino shooting and "certain kinds of ammunition". Conservative figures, including Texas senator Ted Cruz, The Weekly Standard editor Bill Kristol, Fox & Friends co-anchor Steve Doocy, and then-New Jersey governor Chris Christie criticized the Times. Talk radio host Erick Erickson acquired an issue of The New York Times to fire several rounds into the paper, posting a picture online.

=== Printing process ===
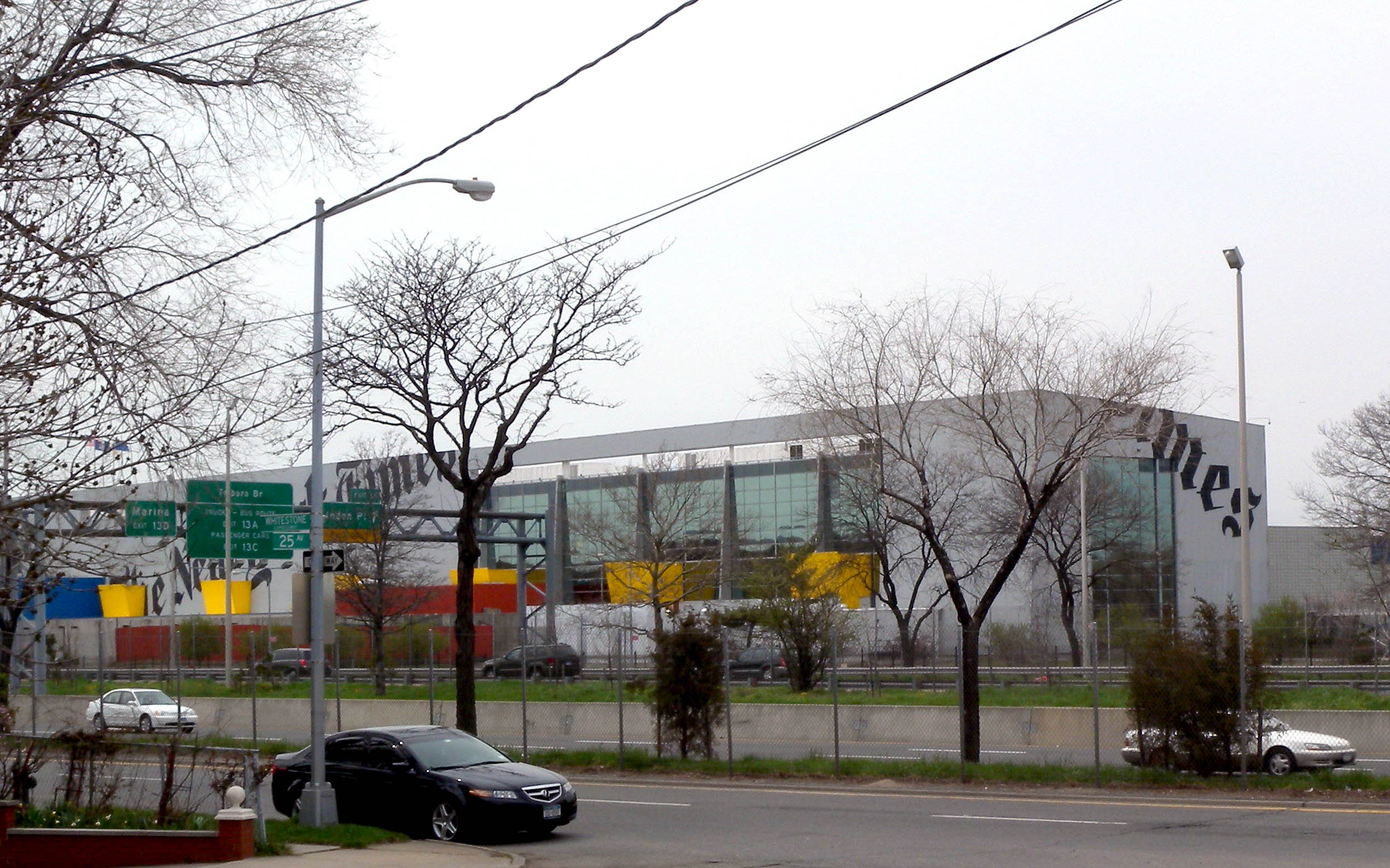
The New York Times's distribution center in College Point, Queens

Since 1997, The New York Times's primary distribution center is located in College Point, Queens. The facility is 300,000 ft^{2} (28,000 m^{2}) and employs 170 people as of 2017. The College Point distribution center prints 300,000 to 800,000 newspapers daily. On most occasions, presses start before 11 p.m. and finish before 3 a.m. A robotic crane grabs a roll of newsprint and several rollers ensure ink can be printed on paper. The final newspapers are wrapped in plastic and shipped out. As of 2018, the College Point facility accounted for 41% of production. Other copies are printed at 26 other publications, such as The Atlanta Journal-Constitution, The Dallas Morning News, The Santa Fe New Mexican, and the (Louisville) Courier Journal. With the decline of newspapers, particularly regional publications, the Times must travel further; for example, newspapers for Hawaii are flown from San Francisco on United Airlines, and Sunday papers are flown from Los Angeles on Hawaiian Airlines. Computer glitches, mechanical issues, and weather phenomena affect circulation but do not stop the paper from reaching customers. The College Point facility prints over two dozen other papers, including The Wall Street Journal and USA Today.

The New York Times has halted its printing process several times to account for major developments. The first printing stoppage occurred on March 31, 1968, when then-president Lyndon B. Johnson announced that he would not seek a second term. Other press stoppages include May 19, 1994, for the death of former first lady Jacqueline Kennedy Onassis, and July 17, 1996, for Trans World Airlines Flight 800. The 2000 presidential election necessitated two press stoppages. Al Gore appeared to concede on November 8, forcing then-executive editor Joseph Lelyveld to stop the Times's presses to print a new headline, "Bush Appears to Defeat Gore", with a story that stated George W. Bush was elected president. However, Gore held off his concession speech over doubts over Florida. Lelyveld reran the headline, "Bush and Gore Vie for an Edge". Since 2000, three printing stoppages have been issued: for the death of William Rehnquist on September 3, 2005, for the killing of Osama bin Laden on May 1, 2011, and for the passage of the Marriage Equality Act in the New York State Assembly and subsequent signage by then-governor Andrew Cuomo on June 24, 2011.

== Online platforms ==
=== Website ===
The New York Times website is hosted at nytimes.com. It has undergone several major redesigns and infrastructure developments since its debut. In April 2006, The New York Times redesigned its website with an emphasis on multimedia. In preparation for Super Tuesday in February 2008, the Times developed a live election system using the Associated Press's File Transfer Protocol (FTP) service and a Ruby on Rails application; nytimes.com experienced its largest traffic on Super Tuesday and the day after.

=== Applications ===
The NYTimes application debuted with the introduction of the App Store on July 10, 2008. Engadget's Scott McNulty wrote critically of the app, negatively comparing it to The New York Times's mobile website. An iPad version with select articles was released on April 3, 2010, with the release of the first-generation iPad. In October, The New York Times expanded NYT Editors' Choice to include the paper's full articles. NYT for iPad was free until 2011. The Times applications on iPhone and iPad began offering in-app subscriptions in July 2011. The Times released a web application for iPad—featuring a format summarizing trending headlines on Twitter—and a Windows 8 application in October 2012.

Efforts to ensure profitability through an online magazine and a "Need to Know" subscription emerged in Adweek in July 2013. In March 2014, The New York Times announced three applications—NYT Now, an application that offers pertinent news in a blog format, and two unnamed applications, later known as NYT Opinion and NYT Cooking—to diversify its product laterals.

=== Podcasts ===
The Daily is the modern front page of The New York Times.

— Sam Dolnick, speaking to Intelligencer in January 2020

The New York Times manages several podcasts, including multiple podcasts with Serial Productions. The Times's longest-running podcast is The Book Review Podcast, debuting as Inside The New York Times Book Review in April 2006.

The New York Times's defining podcast is The Daily, a daily news podcast hosted by Michael Barbaro which debuted on February 1, 2017. Between March 2022 and March 2025, the approximately 30 minute programme was co-hosted with Sabrina Tavernise. Beginning in April 2025 Barbaro was joined by two new regular co-hosts, Natalie Kitroeff and Rachel Abrams.

The Interview was launched in 2024 and is hosted weekly by David Marchese and Lulu Garcia-Navarro. Episodes typically last 40 to 50 minutes. Condensed versions of the interviews are published simultaneously in The New York Times Magazine. Guests have included politicians, actors, influential experts, media figures and high-profile writers.

In October 2021, The New York Times began testing "New York Times Audio", an application featuring podcasts from the Times, audio versions of articles—including from other publications through Audm, and archives from This American Life. The application debuted in May 2023 exclusively on iOS for Times subscribers. New York Times Audio includes exclusive podcasts such as The Headlines, a daily news recap, and Shorts, short audio stories under ten minutes. In addition, a "Reporter Reads" section features Times journalists reading their articles and providing commentary.

=== Games ===
The New York Times has used video games as part of its journalistic efforts, among the first publications to do so, contributing to an increase in Internet traffic; the publication has also developed its own video games. In 2014, The New York Times Magazine introduced Spelling Bee, a word game in which players guess words from a set of letters in a honeycomb and are awarded points for the length of the word and receive extra points if the word is a pangram. The game was proposed by Will Shortz, created by Frank Longo, and has been maintained by Sam Ezersky. In May 2018, Spelling Bee was published on nytimes.com, furthering its popularity. In February 2019, the Times introduced Letter Boxed, in which players form words from letters placed on the edges of a square box, followed in June 2019 by Tiles, a matching game in which players form sequences of tile pairings, and Vertex, in which players connect vertices to assemble an image. In July 2023, The New York Times introduced Connections, in which players identify groups of words that are connected by a common property. In April, the Times introduced Digits, a game that required using operations on different values to reach a set number; Digits was shut down in August. In March 2024, The New York Times released Strands, a themed word search.

In January 2022, The New York Times Company acquired Wordle, a word game developed by Josh Wardle in 2021, at a valuation in the "low-seven figures". The acquisition was proposed by David Perpich, a member of the Sulzberger family who proposed the purchase to Knight over Slack after reading about the game. The Washington Post purportedly considered acquiring Wordle, according to Vanity Fair. At the 2022 Game Developers Conference, Wardle stated that he was overwhelmed by the volume of Wordle facsimiles and overzealous monetization practices in other games. Concerns over The New York Times monetizing Wordle by implementing a paywall mounted; Wordle is a client-side browser game and can be played offline by downloading its webpage. Wordle moved to the Times's servers and website in February. The game was added to the NYT Games application in August, necessitating it be rewritten in the JavaScript library React. In November, The New York Times announced that Tracy Bennett would be the Wordle's editor.

== Other publications ==
=== The New York Times Magazine ===
The New York Times Magazine and The Boston Globe Magazine are the only weekly Sunday magazines following The Washington Post Magazine's cancellation in December 2022.

=== The New York Times International Edition ===
==== The New York Times in Spanish ====
In February 2016, The New York Times introduced a Spanish website, The New York Times en Español. The website, intended to be read on mobile devices, would contain translated articles from the Times and reporting from journalists based in Mexico City. The Times en Español's style editor is Paulina Chavira, who has advocated for pluralistic Spanish to accommodate the variety of nationalities in the newsroom's journalists and wrote a stylebook for The New York Times en Español.

Articles the Times intends to publish in Spanish are sent to a translation agency and adapted for Spanish writing conventions; the present progressive tense may be used for forthcoming events in English, but other tenses are preferable in Spanish. The Times en Español consults the Real Academia Española and Fundéu and frequently modifies the use of diacritics—such as using an acute accent for the Cártel de Sinaloa but not the Cartel de Medellín—and using the gender-neutral pronoun elle. Headlines in The New York Times en Español are not capitalized. The Times en Español publishes El Times, a newsletter led by Elda Cantú intended for all Spanish speakers. In September 2019, The New York Times ended The New York Times en Español's separate operations. A study published in The Translator in 2023 found that the Times en Español engaged in tabloidization.

==== The New York Times in Chinese ====
In June 2012, The New York Times introduced a Chinese website, 纽约时报中文, in response to Chinese editions created by The Wall Street Journal and the Financial Times. Conscious to censorship, the Times established servers outside of China and affirmed that the website would uphold the paper's journalistic standards; the government of China had previously blocked articles from nytimes.com through the Great Firewall, and the website was blocked in China until August 2001 after then-general secretary Jiang Zemin met with journalists from The New York Times. Then-foreign editor Joseph Kahn assisted in the establishment of cn.nytimes.com, an effort that contributed to his appointment as executive editor in April 2022.

In October 2012, 纽约时报中文 published an article detailing the wealth of then-premier Wen Jiabao's family. In response, the government of China blocked access to nytimes.com and cn.nytimes.com and references to the Times and Wen were censored on microblogging service Sina Weibo. In March 2015, a mirror of 纽约时报中文 and the website for GreatFire were the targets for a government-sanctioned distributed denial of service attack on GitHub in March 2015, disabling access to the service for several days. Chinese authorities requested the removal of The New York Times's news applications from the App Store in December 2016.

== Awards and recognition ==
=== Awards ===
As of 2023, The New York Times has received 137 Pulitzer Prizes, the most of any publication.

=== Recognition ===
The New York Times is considered a newspaper of record in the United States. (Note: Attributed to multiple references:) The Times is the largest metropolitan newspaper in the United States; as of 2022, The New York Times is the second-largest newspaper by print circulation in the United States behind The Wall Street Journal.

A study published in Science, Technology, & Human Values in 2013 found that The New York Times received more citations in academic journals than the American Sociological Review, Research Policy, or the Harvard Law Review. With sixteen million unique records, the Times is the third-most referenced source in Common Crawl, a collection of online material used in datasets such as GPT-3, behind Wikipedia and a United States patent database.

The New Yorker's Max Norman wrote in March 2023 that the Times has shaped mainstream English usage. In a January 2018 article for The Washington Post, Margaret Sullivan stated that The New York Times affects the "whole media and political ecosystem".

The New York Times's success has led to concerns over media consolidation, particularly amid the decline of newspapers. In 2006, economists Lisa George and Joel Waldfogel examined the consequences of the Times's national distribution strategy and audience with circulation of local newspapers, finding that local circulation decreased among college-educated readers. The effect of The New York Times in this manner was observed in The Forum of Fargo-Moorhead, the newspaper of record for Fargo, North Dakota. Axios founder Jim VandeHei opined that the Times is "going to basically be a monopoly" in an opinion piece written by then-media columnist and former BuzzFeed News editor-in-chief Ben Smith; in the article, Smith cites the strength of The New York Times's journalistic workforce, broadening content, and the expropriation of Gawker editor-in-chief Choire Sicha, Recode editor-in-chief Kara Swisher, and Quartz editor-in-chief Kevin Delaney. Smith compared the Times to the New York Yankees during their 1927 season containing Murderers' Row.

== Controversies ==
=== Israeli–Palestinian conflict ===
Since 2002, studies analyzing coverage of the Israeli–Palestinian conflict in the New York Times have demonstrated a bias against Palestinians and in favor of Israel. (Note: A 2003 study in the Harvard International Journal of Press/Politics concluded that The New York Times reporting was more favorable to Israelis than to Palestinians. A 2002 study published in the journal Journalism examined Middle East coverage of the Second Intifada over a one-month period in The New York Times, The Washington Post and the Chicago Tribune. The study authors said that the Times was "the most slanted in a pro-Israeli direction" with a bias "reflected...in its use of headlines, photographs, graphics, sourcing practices, and lead paragraphs." A Media, War & Conflict study based on a quantitative analysis of use of active and passive voice and of the sentiment of the language used during the first and second Palestinian intifadas found the paper's coverage of the events was disproportionately anti-Palestinian and that such bias worsened from the First Intifada to the Second.)

==== Gaza war ====
The New York Times has received criticism for its coverage of the Gaza war and genocide.

In 2024, a study in the journal Israel Affairs accused The Times of being biased against Israel and in favor of Palestinians. They found "errors, omissions, and poor editorial supervision" in the paper's coverage of the Gaza war, arguing:

The casualty reports throughout the war relied almost solely on the Gaza Ministry of Health, which is controlled by Hamas, and frequently produced false and inflated data. Also, the repeated omissions of IDF statements about journalists that were active Hamas operatives showed that the Times preferred to believe Aljazeera, a questionable news organisation serving an autocratic leader, over the credibility of the IDF, a formal institution of a democratic state.

Israeli prime minister Benjamin Netanyahu and others have also accused The New York Times of bias against Israel, accusations that Eric Alterman claims is false.

In May 2026, Netanyahu and Israeli foreign minister Gideon Sa'ar stated they intended to file a libel lawsuit against The Times claiming an article by Nicholas Kristof contained numerous falsehoods. The article, entitled "The Silence That Meets the Rape of Palestinians", accused Israeli security forces, soldiers, prison guards, and settlers of widespread sexual assault of Palestinian detainees in the Israeli prison system, including the sexual assault of women and children. In regards to the article, Netanyahu and Sa'ar accused The Times of orchestrating "one of the most hideous and distorted lies ever published against the State of Israel in the modern press."

In September 2026 shareholders filed a lawsuit requesting that the Times release internal records regarding decisions about their Gaza coverage, amid claims that the Times violated its own editorial policies in its coverage. In particular it claims that bias concerns were not addressed and not brought to the attention of the leadership, and when it was, appropriate action was not taken. The suit is in partial response to the lack of action by the Times for a response to the National Jewish Advocacy Center (NJAC), request on May 29 to the May 11 Nicholas Kristof column titled “The Silence That Meets the Rape of Palestinians" .

In April 2024, The Intercept reported that a November 2023 internal memorandum by Susan Wessling and Philip Pan instructed journalists to reduce using the terms "genocide" and "ethnic cleansing" and to avoid using the phrase "occupied territory" in the context of Palestinian land, "Palestine" except in rare circumstances, and the term "refugee camps" to describe areas of Gaza despite recognition from the United Nations. A spokesperson from the Times stated that issuing guidance was standard practice. An analysis by The Intercept noted that The New York Times described Israeli deaths as a massacre nearly sixty times, but had only described Palestinian deaths as a massacre once. Writers and editors have left the newspaper due to its coverage of events in Gaza, including Jazmine Hughes and Jamie Lauren Keiles.

In December 2023, The New York Times published an investigation titled "'Screams Without Words': How Hamas Weaponized Sexual Violence on Oct. 7", alleging that Hamas weaponized sexual and gender-based violence during its armed incursion on Israel. The investigation was the subject of an article from The Intercept questioning the journalistic acumen of Anat Schwartz, a filmmaker involved in the inquiry who had no prior reporting experience and agreed with a post stating Israel should "violate any norm, on the way to victory", doubting the veracity of the opening claim that Gal Abdush was raped in a timespan disputed by her family, and alleging that the Times was pressured by the Committee for Accuracy in Middle East Reporting in America. The New York Times initiated an inquiry into the leaking of confidential information about the report to other outlets, which received criticism from NewsGuild of New York president Susan DeCarava for purported racial targeting; the Times's investigation was inconclusive, but found gaps in the way proprietary journalistic material is handled.

The New York Times Building has been a site of protest action during the Gaza war and genocide, including a November 2023 sit-in demanding that The Times's editorial board publicly call for a ceasefire and accusing the media company of "complicity in laundering genocide", a February 29, 2024, protest and press conference following the release of The Intercept's critical investigation into the "Screams Without Words" exposé, and an action on July 30, 2025, in which protesters spray-painted "NYT Lies, Gaza dies" on the building's glass facade. In addition, protesters blocked The New York Times's distribution center March 14, 2024 and executive editor Joseph Kahn's residence was splattered with red paint on August 25, 2025. The collective Writers Against the War on Gaza, which publishes the mock publication The New York War Crimes, has been associated with protests against The New York Times. On October 27, 2025, 300 writers—including scholars, journalists, and public intellectuals—pledged to boycott The New York Times and withhold contributions to the paper in protest of what they describe as its complicity in the Gaza genocide, demanding 1) a review of anti-Palestinian bias in the newsroom, 2) a retraction of "Screams Without Words", and 3) a call from the editorial board for a US arms embargo on Israel. Among the initial signatories, about 150 had previously contributed to the Times.

=== Transgender people ===
The New York Times' reporting on transgender issues has been criticized by the American Academy of Pediatrics, World Professional Association for Transgender Health (WPATH), Endocrine Society, and other major organizations as well as publication outlets. When it published an opinion piece by Weill Cornell Medicine professor Richard A. Friedman called "How Changeable Is Gender?" in August 2015, Vox's German Lopez criticized Friedman as suggesting that parents and doctors might be right in letting children suffer from severe dysphoria in case something changes down the line, and as implying that conversion therapy may work for transgender children.

A January 2023 article by correspondent Katie Baker received criticism for biased reporting against transgender children, misframing the challenges school districts face when students change their gender identity without their parents' knowledge. The article failed to clarify that consequential lawsuits brought by parents against school districts are in actuality part of a legal strategy tied to groups, such as Alliance Defending Freedom, that have identified trans people as an "existential threat."

In February 2023, nearly one thousand current and former Times writers and contributors wrote an open letter addressed to standards editor Philip B. Corbett, criticizing the paper's coverage of transgender, non-binary, and gender-nonconforming people; some of the Times's articles have been cited in state legislatures attempting to justify criminalizing gender-affirming care. Contributors wrote in the open letter that "the Times has in recent years treated gender diversity with an eerily familiar mix of pseudoscience and euphemistic, charged language, while publishing reporting on trans children that omits relevant information about its sources." (Note: Attributed to multiple references:) Tens of thousands of subscribers and readers also signed the letter. One example cited was the use of the term "patient zero" to describe a trans child seeking transgender healthcare. Hundreds of high-profile figures, including Roxane Gay, Jenna Wortham, Dave Itzkoff, Ed Yong, Chelsea Manning, Sarah Schulman, Jia Tolentino, Lena Dunham, Kate Zambreno, Gabrielle Union, Judd Apatow, Tommy Dorfman, and Cynthia Nixon, signed the letter.

That same month, over 130 LGBTQ organizations, including GLAAD, the Human Rights Campaign, and PFLAG, released a coordinated statement which accused the Times of publishing coverage that ultimately spreads harmful misinformation about trans issues and promotes "fringe theories" and "dangerous inaccuracies." As a continued effort from this statement, a digital billboard truck from GLAAD was situated outside of the Times’ headquarters, featuring messages such as “Dear New York Times: Stop Questioning Trans People’s Right to Exist & Access to Medical Care”.

According to former Times journalist Billie Jean Sweeney, a push for writers to challenge "every aspect of being trans", ranging from gender-inclusive language to access to medical care, came from the top in 2022 after leadership was handed over to A. G. Sulzberger, Joe Kahn, and Carolyn Ryan; as part of an effort to win good will with the Trump campaign without incurring backlash from the general populace.

The Times has continually denied any bias in its reporting, stating that its coverage of "fiercely contested medical and legal debates" is fair and balanced, and that it would not tolerate journalists protesting its transgender coverage. In June 2026, civil rights attorney Alejandra Caraballo published a study in her newsletter, The Dissident, which analyzed 3,242 articles that were published in the Times between 2014 and 2026. Caraballo's study concluded that from 2022 onwards, the Times changed the way it covered transgender issues, "moving from rights-based framing toward more skeptical, conflict-driven coverage" which also prioritized the views of opponents of transgender rights ahead of the lived experience transgender people themselves.
