= List of United States presidential election endorsements made by The New York Times =

The New York Times has endorsed a candidate for president of the United States in every election since Abraham Lincoln in 1860. In total, it has endorsed the Democratic candidate twenty-nine times, the Republican twelve times (mostly recently Dwight D. Eisenhower in 1956), and a third-party candidate once (John M. Palmer in 1896). Twenty-five of the forty-two candidates endorsed by the Times went on to be elected president.

Until the middle of the 19th century, newspapers in the United States were largely partisan actors; they intended to persuade rather than inform. Since then, many newspapers, including the New York Times, have separated their editorial opinions from their factual reporting. Newspapers' editorial boards' endorsements have statistically significant affects on voter perception of candidates, though the degree of influence depends on the particular endorsement.

Since 1992, the Times has occasionally issued endorsements in primary elections for both major parties. Of the eleven primary candidates it has endorsed, eight went on to win the New York primary, six became their party's nominee, and one (Bill Clinton) was elected president. The dual endorsement of Amy Klobuchar and Elizabeth Warren in the 2020 Democratic primaries remains the only time in the paper's history that it has endorsed multiple candidates in the same election.

== Primary elections ==
=== Democratic Party ===
Democratic Party
| Year | Candidate | Endorsement | Nominee |
|---|---|---|---|
| 1992 | Bill Clinton | "At this time, in this churning primary campaign, Bill Clinton remains the superior choice for Democrats." | Bill Clinton |
| 1996 | No endorsement (Note: As the incumbent president, Bill Clinton faced no major opposition for the Democratic nomination. No New York state primary was held, and The New York Times did not issue a Democratic primary endorsement; it later endorsed Clinton in the general election.) | | |
| 2000 | Al Gore | "Finally, Mr. Gore's experience as a successful partner in making the right decisions on budget and fiscal issues, and in fighting a reactionary Congress to protect and even expand domestic programs, holds great promise for the future." | Al Gore |
| 2004 | John Kerry | "Mr. Kerry, one of the Senate's experts in foreign affairs, exudes maturity and depth. He can discuss virtually any issue of security or international affairs with authority. What his critics see as an inability to take strong, clear positions seems to us to reflect his appreciation that life is not simple." | John Kerry |
| 2008 | Hillary Clinton | "The next president needs to start immediately on challenges that will require concrete solutions, resolve, and the ability to make government work. Mrs. Clinton is more qualified, right now, to be president." | Barack Obama |
| 2012 | No endorsement (Note: As the incumbent president, Barack Obama faced no major opposition for the Democratic nomination. No New York state primary was held, and The New York Times did not issue a Democratic primary endorsement; it later endorsed Obama in the general election.) | | |
| 2016 | Hillary Clinton | "Hillary Clinton is the right choice for the Democrats to present a vision for America that is radically different from the one that leading Republican candidates offer — a vision in which middle-class Americans have a real shot at prosperity, women's rights are enhanced, undocumented immigrants are given a chance at legitimacy, international alliances are nurtured and the country is kept safe." | Hillary Clinton |
| 2020 | Elizabeth Warren | "Her campaign's plans, in general, demonstrate a serious approach to policymaking that some of the other candidates lack." | Joe Biden |
| 2020 | Amy Klobuchar | "Her vision goes beyond the incremental. Given the polarization in Washington and beyond, the best chance to enact many progressive plans could be under a Klobuchar administration." | Joe Biden |

=== Republican Party ===
Republican Party
| Year | Candidate | Endorsement | Nominee |
|---|---|---|---|
| 1992 | George H. W. Bush | "President Bush, prudent player on the stage of a new world order, warrants his party's renomination, and he surely would have won it in New York, as he has elsewhere." | George H. W. Bush |
| 1996 | No endorsement | | |
| 2000 | John McCain | "As a zestful insurgent battling to open his party, Mr. McCain has brought gusts of fresh air, excitement and common sense to American politics." | George W. Bush |
| 2004 | No endorsement (Note: As the incumbent president, George W. Bush faced no major opposition for the Republican nomination. No New York state primary was held, and The New York Times did not issue a Republican primary endorsement; it later endorsed Bush's Democratic opponent, John Kerry, in the general election.) | | |
| 2008 | John McCain | "Senator John McCain of Arizona is the only Republican who promises to end the George Bush style of governing from and on behalf of a small, angry fringe. With a record of working across the aisle to develop sound bipartisan legislation, he would offer a choice to a broader range of Americans than the rest of the Republican field." | John McCain |
| 2012 | No endorsement | | |
| 2016 | John Kasich | "Gov. John Kasich of Ohio, though a distinct underdog, is the only plausible choice for Republicans tired of the extremism and inexperience on display in this race." | Donald Trump |
| 2020 | No endorsement (Note: As the incumbent president, Donald Trump faced no major opposition for the Republican nomination. No New York state primary was held, and The New York Times did not issue a Republican primary endorsement; it later endorsed Trump's Democratic opponent, Joe Biden, in the general election.) | | |

== General election ==
General election
| Year | Candidate | Result | Endorsement | Other major candidate(s) | | | Ref. |
|---|---|---|---|---|---|---|---|
| 1860 | Abraham Lincoln | Won ✓ | "Things will go on very much as they have hitherto—except that we shall have honesty and manliness instead of meanness and corruption in the Executive departments, and a decent regard for the opinions of mankind in the tone and talk of the Government on the subject of Slavery." | Stephen A. Douglas | John C. Breckinridge | John Bell | |
| 1864 | Abraham Lincoln | Won ✓ | "Loyal men can congratulate themselves not only on this clearness of issue between war and peace, but upon the development of the fact that this issue is indeed no other than Union or Disunion." | George B. McClellan | | | |
| 1868 | Ulysses S. Grant | Won ✓ | "It should be enough that he realizes the need of peace, and upholds a policy which, with many defects, secures the restoration of the Union on the broad basis of order and justice." | Horatio Seymour | | | |
| 1872 | Ulysses S. Grant | Won ✓ | "Greeley's election would mean the unsettling of business all over the country. Gen. Grant's would instantly lead to the recovery of trade from the excitement of a Presidential election, and insure the continued prosperity of the entire Union." | Horace Greeley | | | |
| 1876 | Rutherford B. Hayes | Won ✓ | "Mr. Hayes' letter of acceptance was prompt, unequivocal and more pronounced in two or three important particulars than the platform on which he had been nominated." | Samuel Tilden | | | |
| 1880 | James Garfield | Won ✓ | "The people are asked to choose between a man like this, trained in all the activities and duties of civil life, and one who knows nothing but the camp and the barrack-room. To state this fact is to make the most conclusive argument in favor of the civilian candidate." | Winfield S. Hancock | | | |
| 1884 | Grover Cleveland | Won ✓ | "Gov. Cleveland has given indisputable proofs that he is independent of partisan tyranny, and that there is not in party rule any power than can disturb or weaken his devotion to the highest interests of the people." | James G. Blaine | | | |
| 1888 | Grover Cleveland | Lost ✗ | "His great ability is now candidly recognized. His perfect honesty and sincerity are no longer questioned save by reckless and malignant partisans. His successes and his failures, his titles to applause, honor, and respect, and his acts that have called for censure or justified want of confidence are recorded in an open book." | Benjamin Harrison | | | |
| 1892 | Grover Cleveland | Won ✓ | "Under our Constitution the character of the President is an element of the greatest importance. The powers of the Executive office are very extensive, and its duties of the most and responsible character. The direction of foreign relations is, in the first instance, entirely in his hands." | Benjamin Harrison | James B. Weaver | | |
| 1896 | John M. Palmer | Lost ✗ | "If the Democrats in this State ... will vote according to their convictions and their preference, as honest citizens ought always to vote, a majority of the party will be found standing firmly by its ancient faith, and its prospects for the future will be vastly better than if it goes down to ignominious defeat held together by a blind devotion to 'regularity.'" | William McKinley | William Jennings Bryan | | |
| 1900 | William McKinley | Won ✓ | "There are two questions most prominent this year—what will be the policy of the Republican or of the Democratic Party with reference to our recently acquired possessions, and what the policy of the respective parties as to the currency and finance?" | William Jennings Bryan | | | |
| 1904 | Alton B. Parker | Lost ✗ | "The antithesis of Roosevelt in temperament and opinion, and quite the equal of the strenuous President in moral courage and political sagacity." | Theodore Roosevelt | | | |
| 1908 | William Howard Taft | Won ✓ | "We know that public policies, the old and the new alike, will be executed by Mr. Taft reasonably, with calmness, with sanity. He is less impulsive than Mr. Roosevelt, not given to disturbing utterance, averse to spectacular and ill-judged display. We know nothing of the kind about Mr. Bryan, for he has not been tried. We do not know that his mind is unsteady, his principles unsafe." | William Jennings Bryan | | | |
| 1912 | Woodrow Wilson | Won ✓ | "It is to the interest of the Nation that the Republican party should be preserved as an organized, coherent opposition. The public welfare is not preserved by the collapse of a great party, by the rise of discordant factions in place of a compact organization." | William Howard Taft | Theodore Roosevelt | Eugene V. Debs | |
| 1916 | Woodrow Wilson | Won ✓ | "No one can deny that he has honorably kept our country at peace amid infinite difficulties and temptations." | Charles Evans Hughes | | | |
| 1920 | James M. Cox | Lost ✗ | "He is no champion of privilege any more than he is an apostle of revolution. He is a man of affairs, of the soundest common sense and good judgment. In time of peace he would do away with war taxes and, like Mr. Tilden, substitute for them revenues sufficient for the expenditures of Government economically administered." | Warren G. Harding | | | |
| 1924 | John W. Davis | Lost ✗ | "All the merely petty and spiteful arrows aimed at him have fallen blunted and broken from his shield." | Calvin Coolidge | Robert M. La Follette, Sr. | | |
| 1928 | Alfred E. Smith | Lost ✗ | "The duty of all to whom the conditions under prohibition seem the most important concern of the nation is plainly to vote for Alfred E. Smith. He is the first leader in a national sense to whom they have been able to turn since enforcement became a scandal and social consequences of prohibition became serious." | Herbert Hoover | | | |
| 1932 | Franklin D. Roosevelt | Won ✓ | "He has carried a winning personality into his campaigning, but has not degraded his standards as a high-bred and educated man." | Herbert Hoover | | | |
| 1936 | Franklin D. Roosevelt | Won ✓ | "We believe that in a very fundamental way the President's re-election will provide insurance against radicalism of the sort which the United States has most to fear." | Alf Landon | | | |
| 1940 | Wendell Willkie | Lost ✗ | "As matters stand, the choice before us has been narrowed to this question: In whose hands, Mr. Roosevelt's or Mr. Willkie's, is the safety of the American people likely to be more secure during the critical test that lies ahead?" | Franklin D. Roosevelt | | | |
| 1944 | Franklin D. Roosevelt | Won ✓ | "With all the major new policies of the New Deal we have no sympathy. But when we weigh the balance on domestic issues we must ask: What alternatives do Mr. Dewey and the Republicans offer us?" | Thomas E. Dewey | | | |
| 1948 | Thomas E. Dewey | Lost ✗ | "The Mr. Dewey of 1948, whom we now support, has both a firmer grasp of foreign policy and a more active part in making it than the Mr. Dewey of either 1940 or 1944." | Harry S. Truman | Strom Thurmond | | |
| 1952 | Dwight D. Eisenhower | Won ✓ | "We would make this choice, despite the fact that we have disagreed, and openly expressed our disagreement, with some of the positions taken by General Eisenhower in the course of this campaign." | Adlai E. Stevenson | | | |
| 1956 | Dwight D. Eisenhower | Won ✓ | "In the area of many fundamental matters—for example, at home, the difficult problem of school integration, and, abroad, the question of relaxing tensions in the Far East and the Near East—the approach of both these men is to conciliate rather than coerce, to clarify rather than confuse, to unify rather than disrupt." | Adlai E. Stevenson | | | |
| 1960 | John F. Kennedy | Won ✓ | "Two considerations have carried special weight in determining our judgment. One of these is a matter of foreign policy. The other is a question of assuring a unified direction of the nation's affairs at a difficult moment in history." | Richard Nixon | | | |
| 1964 | Lyndon B. Johnson | Won ✓ | "Rarely in modern times and never in recent years has there been a campaign in which the issues facing the nation have been so inadequately discussed by the two leading candidates; rarely has a campaign added so little to public knowledge; rarely has its end been so welcome." | Barry Goldwater | | | |
| 1968 | Hubert Humphrey | Lost ✗ | "In the span of this campaign, proof that his judgment is superior to that of Mr. Nixon has been provided by their respective choices for Vice President. ... In the brief period since nomination, Gov. Spiro T. Agnew has already proved from his injudicious, intemperate remarks that he is utterly inadequate." | Richard Nixon | George Wallace | | |
| 1972 | George McGovern | Lost ✗ | "It is in the incumbent's very deficiencies of spirit, of vision, of purpose and of principle that in our judgment Mr. McGovern stands in most striking and favorable contrast." | Richard Nixon | | | |
| 1976 | Jimmy Carter | Won ✓ | "He and Senator Mondale have demonstrated both in the broad sweep of political philosophy and in the narrow focus of specific detail a sense of direction and of leadership, based on a humanitarian, socially oriented, essentially liberal approach to most major questions of domestic and foreign policy." | Gerald Ford | | | |
| 1980 | Jimmy Carter | Lost ✗ | "For all the wobbling, Jimmy Carter has forthrightly often bravely upheld intelligent and humane values on a roster of issues." | Ronald Reagan | John B. Anderson | | |
| 1984 | Walter Mondale | Lost ✗ | "Walter Mondale has all the dramatic flair of a trigonometry teacher. His Nordic upbringing makes it hard for him to brag. The first debate may have been the high point of his political personality. But there's power in his plainness." | Ronald Reagan | | | |
| 1988 | Michael Dukakis | Lost ✗ | "George Bush is not the nasty propagandist that his harsh attacks have made him seem. Michael Dukakis is not the unfocused incompetent that his late and lame responses have made him seem. Both are better men, and better potential Presidents than the images they project on television." | George H. W. Bush | | | |
| 1992 | Bill Clinton | Won ✓ | "Bill Clinton, though highly regarded by other governors, has not previously been tested on the national stage. He has, when pressed, shown a discomfiting tendency to blur truthful clarity. But he, much more than his rivals, manifests qualities of leadership: intellect, years of immersion in government, the capacity to attract first-rate people—and the perseverance that has carried him through a brutal campaign." | George H. W. Bush | Ross Perot | | |
| 1996 | Bill Clinton | Won ✓ | "The Presidency he once dreamed is still within his reach if he brings the requisite integrity to the next four years." | Bob Dole | Ross Perot | | |
| 2000 | Al Gore | Lost ✗ | "This is ... the first presidential campaign in recent history centered on an argument over how best to use real, bird-in-the-hand resources to address age-old domestic problems while also defining the United States' role in a world evermore dependent on it for farsighted international leadership." | George W. Bush | | | |
| 2004 | John Kerry | Lost ✗ | "Time and again, history invited George W. Bush to play a heroic role, and time and again he chose the wrong course. We believe that with John Kerry as president, the nation will do better." | George W. Bush | | | |
| 2008 | Barack Obama | Won ✓ | "Mr. Obama has met challenge after challenge, growing as a leader and putting real flesh on his early promises of hope and change. He has shown a cool head and sound judgment. We believe he has the will and the ability to forge the broad political consensus that is essential to finding solutions to this nation's problems." | John McCain | | | |
| 2012 | Barack Obama | Won ✓ | "President Obama has governed from a deep commitment to the role of government in fostering growth, forming sensible budget policies that are not dedicated to protecting the powerful, and saving the social safety net to protect the powerless." | Mitt Romney | | | |
| 2016 | Hillary Clinton | Lost ✗ | "Our endorsement is rooted in respect for her intellect, experience and courage." | Donald Trump | | | |
| 2020 | Joe Biden | Won ✓ | "The former vice president is the leader our nation needs now" | Donald Trump | | | |
| 2024 | Kamala Harris | Lost ✗ | "Kamala Harris has demonstrated care, competence and respect for the Constitution — the fundamental qualities necessary for high office." | Donald Trump | | | |
