= Edward B. Wesley =

American financier and publisher (1811–1906)

Edward Barton Wesley (January 10, 1811 – October 3, 1906) was a stock broker, businessman, banker, financier, and the co-founder of The New York Times.

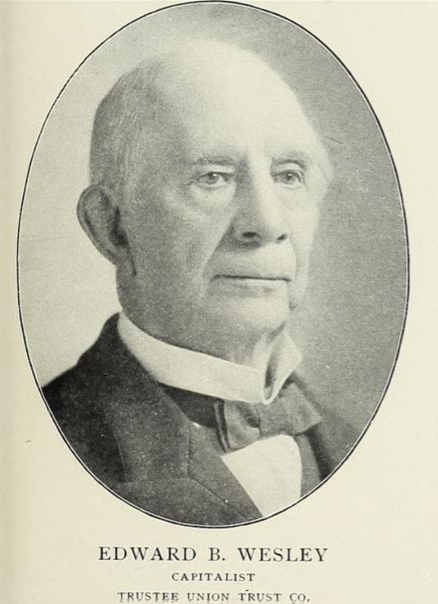
Edward B. Wesley; c. 1899.

== Life and career ==
Wesley was born on January 10, 1811, in Leicester, Massachusetts. At age 13, he started earning a living as a peddler, selling cakes and birch beer in a public square when General Lafayette made an appearance. Initially apprenticed to a carpenter, Wesley saved up $2 from his peddling and decided to try and make a living in New York instead, walking the entire way there.

After arriving in New York, he boarded a room for $2 a week on New Street and worked at the Old Tavern. Shortly thereafter, Wesley boarded the steamboat Jefferson (then called the Queen of the Hudson) and worked his way to Albany, where he got a job working as an office boy in a steamboat line, rubbing shoulders with John Mason and Michael Van Buren, a prominent real estate developer, while there. Eventually, the company sent Wesley back to New York to work at its office, paying him $8 a month.

Tall for his era, stout, and broad-shouldered, Wesley was a lifelong teetotal who also avoided smoking and going to the theaters—common to the young men of his time—in order to save up his salary. With his savings, he began to speculate, namely by geo-arbitraging commodities. Pocketing $1,000 in profits after a year of speculation, he formed a banknote brokerage business with Norman S. Washburn, often carrying $20,000 in cash in his pockets white traveling for business.

Wesley traded out of Van Schaick & Company, starting the year of its founding in 1857. There, he was an active trader at the same time as Jay Gould and Russell Sage. Wesley was noted not only for his profits on the long side but also for dodging corners when selling short and for considerable profits selling options.

Wesley was active in real estate, purchasing land across the U.S. In one noted instance, he sued the state of South Carolina in order to settle a dispute over his purchase of a plot of public land. The case went to the Supreme Court, with Wesley ultimately prevailing.

He became an incorporator of, and Director in, the Union Trust Company of New York and was friends with Hamilton Fish, Thurlow Weed, Samuel J. Tilden, Roswell P. Flower, and Levi P. Morton. Near the end of his life at age 95, he was dubbed “The Oldest Trader in Wall Street” and the “dean” of Wall Street speculators.

=== The New York Times ===
In 1851, using profits from his work as a broker, Wesley co-founded the New-York Daily Times, which later became The New York Times. Wesley acted as the business manager and provided half the starting capital, approximately $20,000 at the time. His co-founders were Henry Jarvis Raymond, the paper's first editor, and George Jones, the paper's first publisher and Wesley's recent business associate. In 1856, Wesley and Henry Keep purchased the Brick Church property, at the corner of Nassau and Park Row, and sold a portion of it to the Times Company, where the first Times Building was built. Wesley sold his interest in the newspaper to Raymond in 1860 in order to focus on founding the Hampden Bank of Armonk in 1861, which issued a $1 bill with a portrait of George Washington.

=== Personal Life and Death ===
Wesley was noted by the New York Times as having generally good health, which he credited to his abstention from alcohol and smoking. He purchased a large estate, which came to be known as the Wesley Estate, in 1853, in Westchester County. The Wesley Estate was located on a 41 acre plot of land that contained a 22 room mansion, two smaller homes, and other smaller buildings. It was sold at auction for a total of $208,785 on May 20, 1922 by Wesley's descendants and divided into 505 city lots; with the largest purchaser being William Ryan.

Three weeks prior to his death in his home on North Regent Street in Port Chester, New York, he suddenly developed a cold and never recovered; passing away on October 3, 1906. Although he had six children, he was survived by only one, “Mrs. Charles Beck” of Mount Vernon, NY. He left behind an estate worth several million dollars at the time, most of which went to his grandchildren. Wesley was buried in Greenwood Union Cemetery.
