= Van Schaick and Company =

Former U.S. investment company

- Industry: Investment services
- Founded: 1857
- Founder: Jacob Van Schaick
- Defunct: 1911
- Fate: "Nelson Act" bankruptcy
- Headquarters: 7 Wall Street, New York City, New York, United States
- Area served: United States
- Products: Investment Banking; Investment management

Van Schaick and Company was an investment company that operated on the East Coast of the United States between 1857 and September 1911, when it fell victim to the Panic of 1910–1911. The company declared bankruptcy September 12, 1911, after it was unable to pay a bill of $100,000 out of a total debt of $600,000 (1911 dollars). At the time, the company had assets exceeding $13.5 million.

The company was founded on Oct. 7, 1857 by Jacob Van Schaick, who kept control of the company within his family. When the company declared bankruptcy, it was being managed by John B. Van Schaick and junior partner Derby Crandall, who rose to that position in 1907 after the death of managing partner A.S. Gorham. At the time of its bankruptcy, the company operated branch offices in Jersey City and Baltimore, Maryland, from its New York City headquarters.

Notable individuals who used Van Schaick and Company as their confidential broker included Edward B. Wesley, Jay Gould, and Russell Sage.
