= Mara Gay =

American journalist and opinion writer

Mara Gay (born 1986 or 1987 (age 39–40)) is an American journalist and opinion writer for The New York Times. She was a member of the newspaper's editorial board from 2018 to 2025, where she led the board's coverage of New York state and local affairs, and she is a political analyst for MS NOW, the cable news network formerly known as MSNBC.

Gay began her career as a digital staff editor at The Atlantic in Washington, D.C., and later covered New York City government for the New York Daily News and The Wall Street Journal before joining The New York Times in 2018. In 2019 she and Emma Goldberg received a monthly Sidney Award from the Sidney Hillman Foundation for an investigative opinion piece on the treatment of clients at New York City's Human Resources Administration. She has been named repeatedly to power lists published by the political trade publication City & State New York, which has described her as "one of the signature voices at New York's paper of record."

== Early life and education ==
Gay is a native New Yorker and grew up in White Plains, New York. She attended White Plains High School, where she was editor-in-chief of the student newspaper, The Orange.

Gay graduated from the University of Michigan in Ann Arbor in 2008 with a degree in political science. As an undergraduate she was a columnist and editorial board writer for the student newspaper, The Michigan Daily.

== Career ==
=== Early reporting ===
Gay began her career as a digital staff editor at The Atlantic in Washington, D.C. She subsequently reported for The Daily, the tablet publication owned by News Corporation.

In 2013 Gay joined the New York Daily News as a City Hall reporter, covering the administrations of mayors Michael Bloomberg and Bill de Blasio. She later moved to The Wall Street Journal as a political reporter covering City Hall, and reported on national news events including the 2015 Charleston church shooting in South Carolina.

=== The New York Times ===
Gay joined The New York Times editorial board in 2018 and served until 2025. During her tenure, she led the board's coverage of New York state and local affairs, writing about the policies, institutions and figures that shape the city, as well as about national affairs and threats to democratic institutions.

In October 2019, Gay and Emma Goldberg published "When Poor People Are Beaten for Seeking Help," an investigative opinion piece examining allegations of physical and sexual abuse of clients by peace officers at New York City's Human Resources Administration. The reporting followed the widely circulated 2018 arrest of Jazmine Headley at a Brooklyn benefits office and documented more than fifty legal complaints filed against the agency since 2013. The Sidney Hillman Foundation named the piece its November 2019 Sidney Award, a monthly prize for investigative journalism that exposes social and economic injustice.

Because the Times editorial board interviews candidates and issues endorsements in New York races, Gay's role has drawn attention from political operatives in the state. In a 2022 article on the board's endorsement process in that year's contested congressional primaries, City & State New York reported that campaigns were "particularly watching" Gay as the board member leading state and local coverage.

In August 2026, Gay wrote and presented a Times Opinion video feature, produced with Emily Holzknecht, in which she traveled through Georgia from the Atlanta suburbs to rural farm country interviewing Black voters about their views of the Democratic Party, Donald Trump and the meaning of the American dream, ahead of a Senate contest expected to help determine control of the chamber in the 2026 midterm elections.

=== Broadcast commentary ===
Gay is a political analyst at MS NOW, appearing regularly on programs including Morning Joe and Deadline: White House. She has also appeared as a guest commentator on local New York television, including NY1.

== Recognition ==
Gay received a monthly Sidney Award from the Sidney Hillman Foundation in November 2019.

City & State New York has included Gay in several of its annual power lists ranking influential figures in New York politics and public life:

- The Power of Diversity: Black 100 (2020), at No. 63, which described her as "an important figure at the New York Times" whose "influence on local politics can't be denied."
- The New York City Power 100 (2021), at No. 96, which cited her "series of poignant columns about her experience with and long recovery from COVID-19."
- The Power of Diversity: Women 100 (2022), at No. 35, which called her "one of the signature voices at New York's paper of record."
- The Power of Diversity: Black 100 (2024), which credited her and reporter Jeff Mays with broadening the paper's focus across the city.
- The New York City Power 100 (2024), at No. 92, which described her as "a gatekeeper for state and local issues before the editorial board" and noted her writing questioning appointments made by Mayor Eric Adams and urging city officials to do more for arriving migrants.

In December 2020, Gay was featured in "The Power Players," a joint project of City & State New York and the New York Amsterdam News profiling Black women in New York government and politics.

== Personal life ==
Gay lives in New York City.

Gay contracted COVID-19 in April 2020, during the early phase of the pandemic in New York City, and wrote and spoke publicly about her illness and prolonged recovery, describing it as "the biggest battle of my life" and discussing the disproportionate toll of the disease on Black and Latino New Yorkers.

== See also ==
- Editorial board
