= Carolyn Ryan =

American newspaper editor

- Education: Bates College (BA)
- Occupation: Managing editor
- Employer: The New York Times

Carolyn Ryan is an American journalist from Massachusetts. She is a co-managing editor of The New York Times, having worked there since 2007. She previously worked as the deputy managing editor of The Boston Globe and prior to that, worked at The Patriot Ledger.

In 2008, she co-led the team of journalists that won a 2009 Pulitzer Prize for Breaking News Reporting on the Eliot Spitzer prostitution scandal. In 2018, she won NLGJA: The Association of LGBTQ Journalists leadership award.

Ryan grew up in Massachusetts. She has a degree in English literature from Bates College, graduating in 1986.
