= Soon-Shiong =

Soon-Shiong is a surname. Notable people with the surname include:

- Nika Soon-Shiong (born 1993), American politician
- Patrick Soon-Shiong (born 1952), South African and American businessman
