= St. Vincent Medical Center (Los Angeles) =

- State of California

Geography
- Location: 2131 West 3rd Street, Los Angeles, California, United States
- Coordinates: 34.063802°N 118.273689°W

Organization
- Care system: Surge
- Type: Specialist
- Affiliated university: None

Services
- Beds: 381
- Speciality: COVID-19

History
- Former names: Los Angeles Infirmary; Sister's Hospital; St. Vincent Hospital
- Founded: 1856
- Closed: January 24, 2020

Links
- Lists: Hospitals in California

St. Vincent Medical Center (SVMC) is a hospital in the Westlake neighborhood of Los Angeles, California, United States. Started by the Daughters of Charity in 1856, the hospital closed on January 24, 2020, due to the bankruptcy of Verity Health System.

The hospital reopened on April 13, 2020, as the Los Angeles Surge Hospital through a partnership with Los Angeles County, Kaiser Permanente and Dignity Health. The State of California temporarily leased the hospital as a treatment center for COVID-19.

== History ==
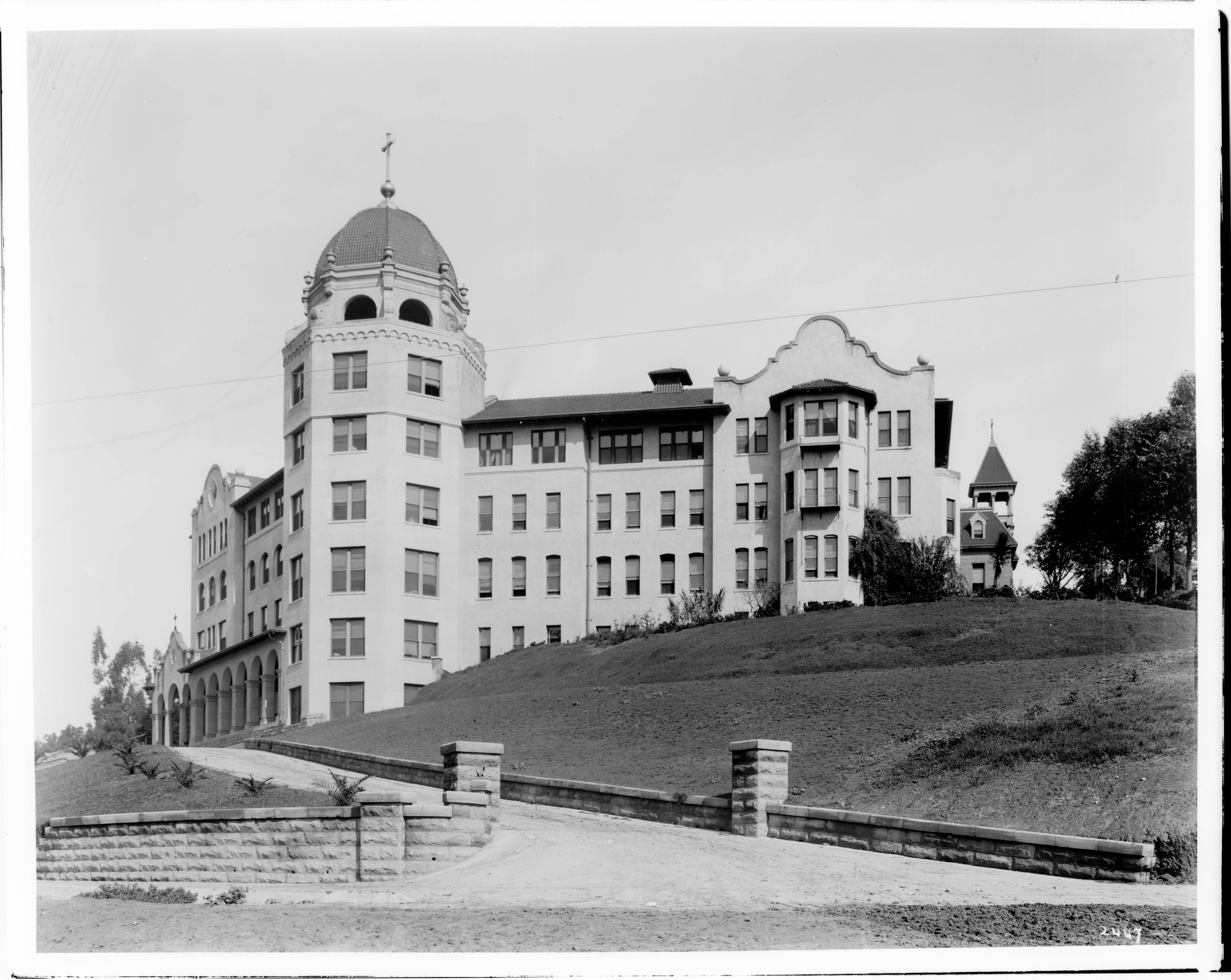
Los Angeles Infirmary, Sisters' Hospital, Sunset Boulevard, c. 1910

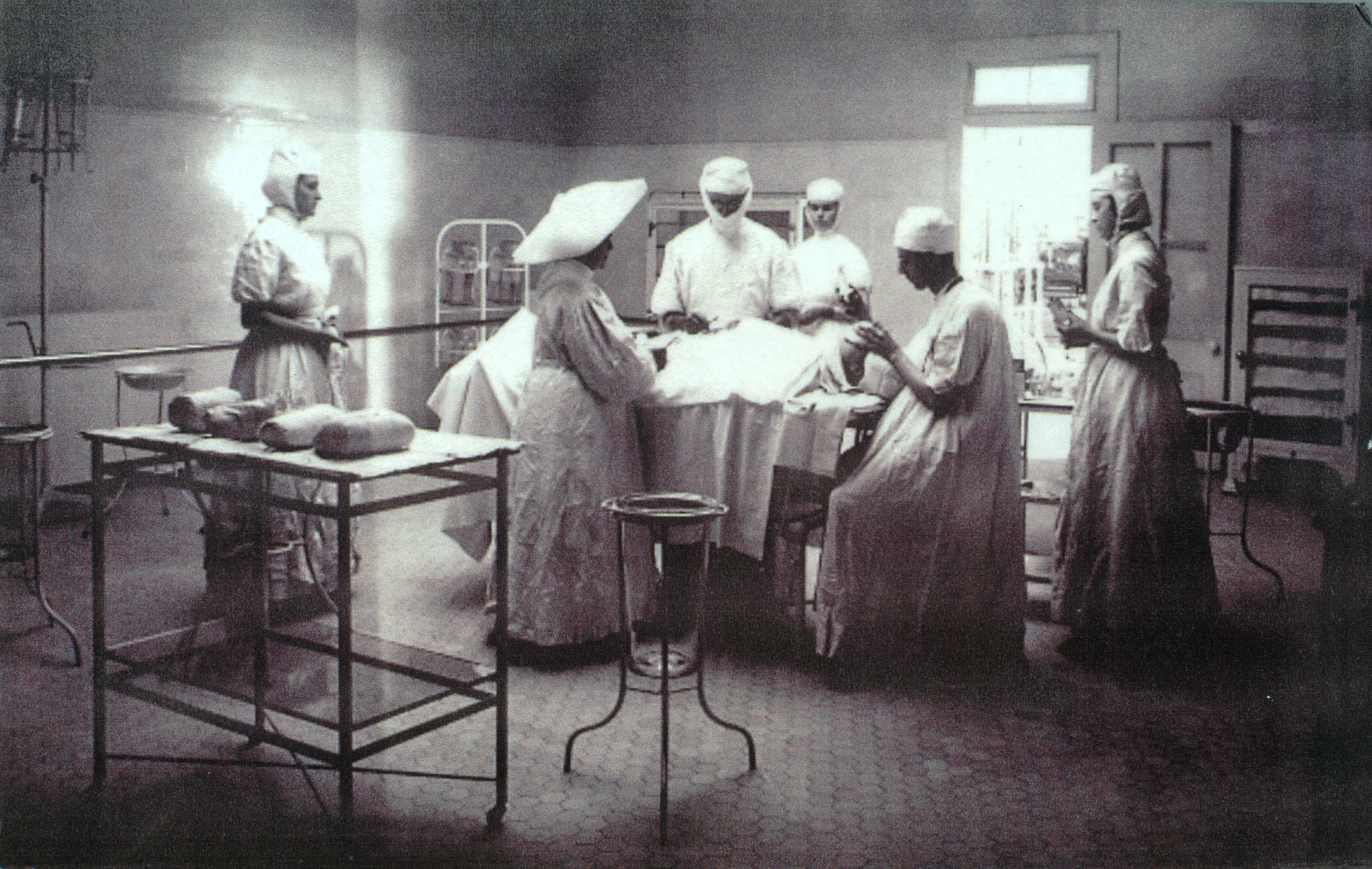
Interior of the Los Angeles Infirmary, 1908

The Daughters of Charity came to Los Angeles on January 6, 1856. This group of six women included three Spanish and three American women. Their initial goal was to start an orphanage and school for the local community. After the county officials recognized the talent of a sister as a nurse, they proposed the idea of them opening an infirmary instead. This would promote a better health system in the community. As a result of their acceptance, the Los Angeles Infirmary was created on June 21, 1869. St. Vincent Medical Center was the first hospital in Los Angeles. The name was changed in 1918 to St. Vincent's Hospital. The name was changed again in 1974 to St. Vincent Medical Center following the construction of a new hospital.

In 1995, the Daughters of Charity National Healthcare System sold SVMC to Catholic Healthcare West. In 2002, CHW sold the hospital to the newly established Daughters of Charity Health System. In 2014, the hospital agreed to be purchased by Prime Healthcare Services as part a sale of all six hospitals in the financially troubled Daughters of Charity Health System. Although the sale was approved by the California Attorney General Kamala Harris, Prime ultimately backed out of the purchase agreement citing onerous approval conditions. In 2015, Harris approved a new deal with BlueMountain Capital, under which the hospital system changed their name to Verity Health System. The hospitals remained nonprofit but not Catholic. In 2017, NantWorks, the holding company run by Patrick Soon-Shiong, bought a majority stake in the management company from BlueMountain.

Verity Health System filed for Chapter 11 bankruptcy protection on August 31, 2018. KPC Group agreed to purchase SVMC for $120 million; however, the sale was not completed by the court-mandated deadline of December 5. On January 6, 2020, Verity announced the closure of St. Vincent Medical Center.

According to a proposal of change of ownership prepared by Medical Development Specialists, the hospital specialized in cardiac care, cancer, total joint and spine care, and multi-organ transplants with a total of 366 beds.

=== Los Angeles Surge Hospital ===
During the coronavirus pandemic in California, Verity Health System entered into an agreement with the State of California on March 20, 2020, to give the State access to the closed hospital as part of the State's preparations to care for patients impacted by COVID-19. The agreement was approved the same day by the U.S. Bankruptcy Court to allow the State to temporarily lease the hospital as a treatment center for COVID-19. . The hospital reopened on April 13, 2020, as the Los Angeles Surge Hospital through a partnership with Los Angeles County, Kaiser Permanente and Dignity Health to increase the county's surge capacity should the need arise. It was a transfer-only facility, accepting patients who test positive for the virus from other regional public and private hospitals.

=== Chan Soon-Shiong Family Foundation ===
The Chan Soon-Shiong Family Foundation placed a $135 million bid to acquire the hospital from Verity. The foundation, run by Patrick Soon-Shiong, MD, and his wife, Michele B. Chan, said it would take over the state's lease obligations at the hospital if the deal is approved by the bankruptcy court.
