= Australia–Palestine relations =

- Australia: Palestine

Australia–Palestine relations refer to the diplomatic, cultural and economic relations between Australia and Palestine. Australia officially recognised Palestine on 21 September 2025.

On 11 August 2025, Australian Prime Minister Anthony Albanese announced plans to recognise Palestine at the United Nations General Assembly in September, reaffirming the country's past support for a two-state solution.

Australia has a representative office in Ramallah, West Bank.

== History ==
=== Early history ===
Australia–Palestine relations started in 1982 with the establishment of a Palestinian information office in Canberra. In 1989, the Australian Government recognised the Palestinian information office as the official representative of the Palestine Liberation Organization. In 1994, this office was upgraded to the status of general delegation. Australia established a representative office in Ramallah in September 2000.

=== 2010s ===
In 2012, Australia voted for making Palestine a non-member observer state in the United Nations.

Riad Malki, Minister of Foreign Affairs of Palestine, visited Australia in 2015. Tony Abbott withdrew Australian opposition to Israeli settlements in the West Bank and Malcolm Turnbull criticised United Nations resolutions against settlement activities. In December 2018, the Morrison government recognised Jerusalem as the capital of Israel but said it would not immediately relocate its embassy from Tel Aviv. This made Australia the third country after the United States and Guatemala to recognise Jerusalem as Israel's capital.

=== 2020s ===
In 2021, the Australian Labor Party incorporated Palestinian statehood in its election platform. From 2022 to 2023, Australia provided US$11 million to the Palestinian territories and US$12.9 million to the United Nations Relief and Works Agency for Palestine Refugees in the Near East.

In October 2022, the Albanese government reversed the recognition of Jerusalem as the capital of Israel and restarted using the term Occupied Palestinian Territories. It also confirmed that the Australian embassy to Israel will remain in Tel Aviv. This move was criticised by representatives of the Australian Jewish community including the Australia/Israel & Jewish Affairs Council, but welcomed by the Palestinian community and Mohammed Shtayyeh, the prime minister of Palestine. It was also criticised by Leader of the Opposition Peter Dutton, the Zionist Federation of Australia, the Executive Council of Australian Jewry, and the government of Israel. It marked a 'modest' change in the Australian government's policy towards Palestine under the Australian Labor Party.

During the Gaza war, the Australian government defended Israel's right to defend itself and retaliate against Hamas's 7 October attack, calling for the release of hostages taken by Hamas. Gareth Evans and Bob Carr have called on Australia to recognise Palestine. The Palestine Action Group organised protests against the war in Australia. The Palestinian Authority was critical of the Australian government's response to the conflict.

In May 2024, Australia was one of 143 countries to support Palestine's bid for full UN membership, but foreign minister Penny Wong later said this did not mean her country would recognise Palestine as a state, that the vote was about awarding 'modest additional rights to participate in United Nations forums' and that Australia would only recognise Palestine 'when we think the time is right'.

On 15 August 2024, Liberal Party leader Peter Dutton called on the Australian government to ban the entry of Palestinian refugees from Gaza. His remarks were condemned by independent MP Zali Steggall, Education Minister Jason Clare, and Australia Palestine Advocacy Network leader Nasser Mashni for promoting racial stereotypes. That same day, SBS World News reported that the Australian government has rejected the majority of Palestinian visa applications, accepting 2,922 and rejecting 7,111 in the period since October 2023. By contrast, the Australian government had granted 8,746 visas to Israeli citizens while rejecting only 235 during that same period.

In late July 2025, the Albanese government joined 15 other countries including France, Canada and New Zealand in signing the 'New York Call' which proposed recognising Palestinian statehood at the United Nations General Assembly in September 2025. On 4 August 2025, Prime Minister Anthony Albanese held a phone call with Palestinian President Mahmoud Abbas. He was thanked for his humanitarian efforts and re-affirmed Canberra's commitment to a two-state solution, but has not recognised Palestinian statehood as of yet. Albanese additionally revealed his intention to formally meet with Abbas in September on the sidelines of the UN General Assembly.

On 11 August 2025, Anthony Albanese announced that Australia would formally recognise a Palestinian state at the United Nations General Assembly in September. He said that 'Australia will recognise the right of the Palestinian people to a state of their own, predicated on the commitments Australia has received from the Palestinian Authority'. These commitments include recognition of Israel's right to exist, demilitarisation and a fresh round of general elections.

On 21 September 2025, Australia officially recognised Palestine, together with Canada and the United Kingdom.

== Public opinion ==
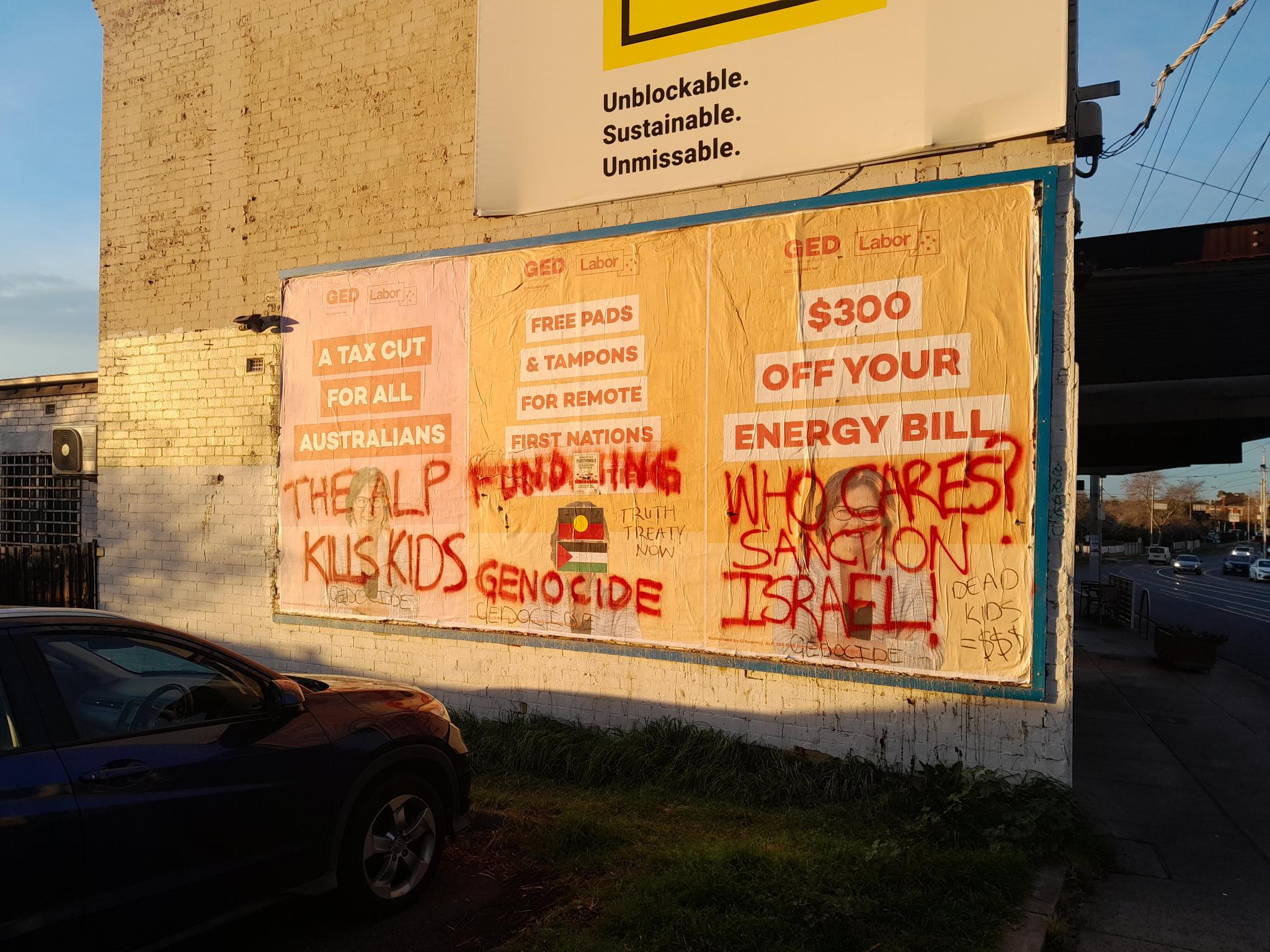
Pro-Palestinian graffiti on campaign ads for Australian politician Ged Kearney in the Melbourne suburb of Preston.

Some Aboriginal Australians, including the Aboriginal Legal Service, have expressed sympathy for Palestinians due to perceived historical parallels. Australian Jewish journalist Antony Loewenstein has criticised mainstream Australian Zionist groups such as AIJAC and the Executive Council of Australian Jewry for supporting Israel's military occupation of the Palestinians.

During the Gaza war, a poll by the Guardian Essential found Australians wanted their government to provide aid to the Palestinians. In May 2024, a YouGov poll conducted between 19 and 23 April found that 35% of Australians supported recognising a Palestinian state, while 21% opposed recognition and 44% stated that they did not know.

== See also ==
- Foreign relations of Australia
- Foreign relations of Palestine
- International recognition of Palestine
- Australia–Israel relations
