= Verity Health System =

California-based healthcare organization

Verity Health System (formerly Daughters of Charity Health System, or DCHS) was a healthcare organization based in Redwood City, California, United States, that operated six hospitals across California with approximately 8,000 associates and physicians.

== History ==
The Daughters of Charity of St Vincent de Paul founded the Los Angeles Infirmary, later the St. Vincent Medical Center, in 1856. Their hospitals were originally sponsored by the Western Province of the Daughters of Charity and were part of the Daughters of Charity National Health System, now Ascension. In 1995, they withdrew from the national system to merge with Catholic Healthcare West (CHW). In 2002, the hospitals withdrew from CHW to become the regional Daughters of Charity Health System. (CHW became Dignity Health.)

Facing financial strain, DCHS sought proposals to purchase the system. An affiliation with Ascension Health did not result in a merger. In 2014, the Daughters of Charity agreed to sell DCHS to Prime Healthcare Services for $843 million. Prime abandoned the acquisition on March 10, 2015, citing restrictions that California Attorney General Kamala Harris placed on the sale.

Later in 2015, DCHS announced a deal where they would become managed by a healthcare subsidiary of New York City-based BlueMountain Capital Management and become Verity Health System, a secular nonprofit. Under the deal, BlueMountain agreed to Harris's condition that all but one DCHS hospital be run as an acute care facility for at least ten years. In addition, BlueMountain would have the option to purchase Verity and convert it to a for-profit entity after three years. In 2017, NantWorks, the holding company of Patrick Soon-Shiong, bought a majority stake in the management company from BlueMountain.

Unable to turn around its financial issues, Verity Health System filed for Chapter 11 bankruptcy protection on August 31, 2018. In 2019, Santa Clara County purchased O'Connor Hospital in San Jose and St. Louise Regional Hospital in Gilroy for $235 million. KPC Group agreed to purchase Seton Medical Center and Seton Coastside in Northern California for a combined $70 million, St. Francis Medical Center in Lynwood for $420 million, and St. Vincent Medical Center in Los Angeles for $120 million. However, the sale was not completed by the court-mandated deadline of December 5.

On January 6, 2020, Verity announced the closure of St. Vincent Medical Center. In March, Verity indicated plans to close Seton Medical Center. Days later, the San Mateo County Board of Supervisors approved $20 million over four years to help keep the hospital open. On March 19, Governor Gavin Newsom announced that the State of California would lease beds at both Seton and St. Vincent for three months as part of its emergency response to the COVID-19 pandemic.

On April 1, the bankruptcy court approved the sale of St. Vincent to the Chan Soon-Shiong Family Foundation for $135 million. On April 9, Verity announced the sale of St. Francis Medical Center to Prime Healthcare Services for $350 million. On April 22, the court approved the sale of Seton Medical Center and Seton Coastside to AHMC Healthcare for $40 million.
