= God Under Howard =

2005 book by Marion Maddox

- Author: Marion Maddox
- Publication date: 2005
- ISBN: 1741145686

God Under Howard: The Rise of the Religious Right in Australian Politics (pbk ISBN 1741145686) is a 2005 book by Marion Maddox. Maddox argues that, from 1996, John Howard's Liberal Party slowly imported US Christian right values and that the Australian media reported little about this shift in social and public policy. Maddox suggests that the line between church and state became blurred, as happened in America.

== See also ==
- High and Dry (book)
- The Times Will Suit Them
