= May Beenken =

American mathematician

May Margaret Beenken
- Born: October 22, 1901; Philadelphia, Pennsylvania
- Died: December 21, 1988 (aged 87); St. Vincent Medical Center (Los Angeles)
- Occupation: Mathematician
- Years active: 1928–1969

May Margaret Beenken (22 October 1901, Philadelphia, Pennsylvania – 21 December 1988, St. Vincent Medical Center (Los Angeles)) was an American mathematician.

== Life ==
Beenken was born in Philadelphia, Pennsylvania. Her parents were Sophie Kirn (1862 – 1941) and Henry Beenken (b. 1852). and she had at least three older siblings.

== Career ==
Beenken completed her PhD at the University of Chicago in 1928. Her doctoral advisor was Ernest Preston Lane and her thesis was titled Surfaces in Five-Dimensional Space. She later became an instructor at Oshkosh Teacher's College. She also served as a lecturer at the University of California, Los Angeles in 1945, as well as an associate professor (later professor) at Immaculate Heart College from 1947 to 1969.

== Personal life ==
After retiring, "she decided to turn to painting" and "applied herself here with the same single-mindedness as in teaching", according to a former colleague and student of hers.
