= Rhonda Doyle =

Australian actress (active 1986– )

- Education: National Institute of Dramatic Art (1989)
- Occupation: Actress
- Years active: 1986–present
- Known for: "Not happy, Jan!" Yellow Pages TVC

Rhonda Doyle is an Australian actress, appearing in film, TV and theatre, best known for having played Jan in the advertisement for Yellow Pages with the line "Not happy, Jan!"

== Early life ==
Doyle attended Sydney's National Institute of Dramatic Art (NIDA), graduating in 1989. She appeared in their third year production of Joking Apart, and their 1989 graduating production of Restoration.

== Career ==
Doyle's early stage roles following her graduation from drama school included a touring production of Wendy Harmer's Backstage Pass in 1990, Pest House at NIDA Parade Theatre in 1991 and Sometimes I Wish I Was Jana Wendt at Harold Park Hotel in 1992.

Doyle was a main cast member in 1998 children's TV series Misery Guts, based on the Morris Gleitzman books, playing the role of Marge Shipley.

Doyle became known for her role as Jan in the iconic television advertisement for Yellow Pages, which first aired in 2000. The advertisement popularised the catch phrase "Not happy, Jan!", uttered by Jan's boss (played by Deborah Kennedy), which subsequently went on to become part of Australian cultural vernacular, used to express displeasure at a problem caused by negligence or incompetence.

She then played one of the leading roles of Tiffany Parker in 2001 SBS comedy-drama series Going Home. That same year, she also appeared in 2001 Fox Family TV movie When Good Ghouls Go Bad, playing Mrs Churney, alongside Christopher Lloyd. In 2003, Doyle featured in children's series Snobs, in the recurring role of Clarissa Bellingham. The following year she played the recurring role of Ali in drama series Fireflies and guested in an episode of ensemble drama series Love My Way.

In 2008, Doyle appeared in two feature films, including family adventure film Nim's Island, playing Edmund's mother Shirley, opposite Jodie Foster and Gerard Butler. She also appeared in comedy-drama film The View from Greenhaven, with Wendy Hughes. She was later seen in 2013 thriller Felony, alongside Joel Edgerton and Tom Wilkinson.

More recently, Doyle landed a recurring role in 2022 series The Tourist, playing Constable Carter alongside Jamie Dornan. In 2024, she then appeared in political drama series Total Control, starring Rachel Griffiths and Deborah Mailman.

Doyle has also made numerous guest appearances throughout her career, in series including A Country Practice, Home and Away, Cody, Water Rats, All Saints, Chandon Pictures, Rescue: Special Ops, My Place, Rake, Hiding, Cleverman and Harrow.

== Filmography ==
=== Film ===
Year	Title	Role	Notes	Ref
2008	Nim's Island	Edmund's mother Shirley		
2008	The View from Greenhaven	Sylvia		
2009	War Games	Mum	Short film	
2012	Project Top Clown	DaffyDil	Short film	
2013	The Misfortune of Others	Vet's Wife	Short film	
2013	Felony	Renya Denka		
2013	Bursting!	Slobby Neighbour	Short film	

=== Television ===
Year	Title	Role	Notes	Ref
1991	A Country Practice	Goldie Harper	2 episodes	
1991; 2003; 2011	Home and Away	Diane / Lesley / Mrs Daniels	3 episodes	
1994	Cody: Bad Love	Female Customs Officer	TV movie	
1996	Naked: Stories of Men	Toy Woman	1 episode	
1998	Children's Hospital	Maureen Hawkins	1 episode	
1998	Water Rats	Becky Olejarnick	1 episode	
1998	Misery Guts	Marge Shipley	13 episodes; Main role	
2001	Going Home	Tiffany Parker	67 episodes; Main role	
2001	When Good Ghouls Go Bad	Mrs Churney	TV movie	
2001; 2004	All Saints	Melissa Harris / Noeline Simpson	3 episodes	
2003	Snobs	Clarissa Bellingham	7 episodes	
2003	Marking Time	Aunt Holly	Miniseries	
2004	Fireflies	Ali	12 episodes	
2004	Love My Way	Adele Rodger	1 episode	
2009	Chandon Pictures	Melanie	1 episode	
2009	Rescue: Special Ops	Madam	1 episode	
2009	My Place	Housewife	1 episode	
2010	Rake	Florist	1 episode	
2015	Hiding	JCF Administrator	1 episode	
2016	Cleverman	Secretary	1 episode	
2020	Chan & Dee's Drink Tank	Bettina Westfield-Rockbottom / Maggie Teepee	Web miniseries	
2021	Harrow	Brenda Sallow	1 episode	
2022	The Tourist	Constable Carter	3 episodes	
2024	Total Control	Radiographer	1 episode	
2026	Caper Crew	Inner Tonk	1 episode	
TBA	Alantown	Sandy	In development	

== Theatre ==
Year	Title	Role	Notes	Ref
1986	The Real Inspector Hound	Mrs Drudge	La Boite Theatre, Brisbane	
1989	Major Barbara & Joking Apart		NIDA Parade Theatre, Sydney	
1989	Restoration		NIDA, Sydney	
1990	Backstage Pass		The Rocks Theatre, Sydney with Toe Truck Theatre	
1991	Pest House		NIDA Parade Theatre, Sydney	
1991	Steaming		Her Majesty's Theatre, Adelaide, Regal Theatre, Perth, QPAC, Brisbane with Gary Penny Productions	
1991	Sometimes I Wish I Was Jana Wendt		Harold Park Hotel, Sydney with Stage Pulse	
1994	Fire Down Under		Crossroads Theatre, Sydney	
1994	The Fire Raisers		Crossroads Theatre, Sydney	
2010	Catholic School Girls		Glen St Theatre, Sydney, Darlinghurst Theatre, Sydney	
2015	Shivered	Evie	PACT Theatre, Sydney with Mad March Hare Theatre Co	
