= St. Francis Medical Center (Lynwood) =

- Prime Healthcare Services

Geography
- Location: Lynwood, California, United States
- Coordinates: 33.9299°N 118.2033°W

Organization
- Care system: Private
- Type: Community
- Affiliated university: None

Services
- Emergency department: Level II trauma center
- Beds: 384

History
- Founded: 1945

Links
- Website: stfrancismedicalcenter.com
- Lists: Hospitals in California

St. Francis Medical Center is a for-profit hospital in Lynwood, California, United States, owned by Prime Healthcare Services.

== History ==
The hospital was founded in 1945 by the Sisters of St. Francis of Penance and Christian Charity. In 1981, it was acquired by the Daughters of Charity of St. Vincent de Paul.

In January 1996, the hospital's emergency department was designated a level II trauma center.

After the August 2007 closure of the troubled nearby public hospital, Martin Luther King Jr.-Harbor Hospital (King-Harbor), St. Francis' proximity caused it to receive the greater number of former patients. The hospital has since expanded its emergency department by 14 beds and seen an increase in patients to 180 per day (from 155), with the intensive care unit seeing an average rise from 26 patients to 33. As King-Harbor was long a major hospital for the city's sickest and poorest residents, the increase in uninsured and under-insured patients has put stress on the finances of the facility.

As the hospital continued to lose money, the California Medical Association and the California Nurses Association supported Daughters of Charity Health System selling the facility to Prime Healthcare Services, though Service Employees International Union opposed the sale. Prime Healthcare backed away from sale based on the terms set by Attorney General Kamala Harris.

On December 3, 2015, Harris conditionally approved transferring the hospital property to BlueMountain Capital, which promised $250 million in capital improvements. Daughters of Charity Health System soon became Verity Health System.

Verity Health System filed for bankruptcy protection in 2018. In 2019, Verity agreed to sell St. Francis to KPC Group in Riverside for $420 million, but the deal was not completed.

On April 9, 2020, Verity announced the sale of St. Francis to Prime Healthcare Services for over $350 million; Prime committed to investing $47 million in capital improvements, the deal was completed in August 2020.

== Description ==
As of 2015, St. Francis has 384 beds, 375 doctors, and about 20,000 patients a year.
