= Not Happy, John =

Book by Margo Kingston

- Author: Margo Kingston
- Publisher: Penguin Books
- Publication date: April 2004
- ISBN: 9780143002581

Not Happy, John is a book written by Margo Kingston, an Australian journalist and political commentator. It outlines why she is not happy with then Prime Minister of Australia, John Howard, and his policies for Australia. Many opinions published on Margo Kingston's Webdiary made their way into the book. The book inspired the 'Not happy, John!' campaign to oppose the re-election of John Howard as member for Bennelong in the 2004 Australian federal election.

Not Happy, John is written in five parts:

- John's Australia
- My Australia
- Whose Australia?
- Their Australia
- Our Australia

Not Happy, John was published Penguin Books in 2004. The book was launched by Tony Fitzgerald QC.

On 3 August 2007, the publishing director of Penguin Australia, Bob Sessions, asked Margo Kingston to update Not Happy, John. Still not Happy, John! was published on 1 October 2007. The title is taken from a television ad campaign, with the catchphrase Not happy, Jan!

== See also ==
- High and Dry
- The Times Will Suit Them
