= Anaheim Regional Medical Center =

- AHMC Healthcare

Geography
- Location: Anaheim, California, United States
- Coordinates: 33°50′54″N 117°56′04″W

Services
- Beds: 223

History
- Founded: 1958

Links
- Website: www.ahmchealth.com/armc/
- Lists: Hospitals in California

Anaheim Regional Medical Center, formerly known as Anaheim Memorial Medical Center, is a 228-bed, acute care hospital in North Anaheim, California. It opened in 1958 and serves the greater North Anaheim, South Fullerton, La Habra, and La Mirada areas. It was named one of the top 100 hospitals in the country for quality in the areas of heart attack care, heart failure care and pneumonia care.

As of July 1, 2009, this medical center is owned by AHMC Healthcare, which also owns and operates Garfield Medical Center, Whittier Hospital Medical Center and San Gabriel Valley Medical Center.

== See also ==
- List of hospitals in California
