= Seton Medical Center =

- AHMC Healthcare

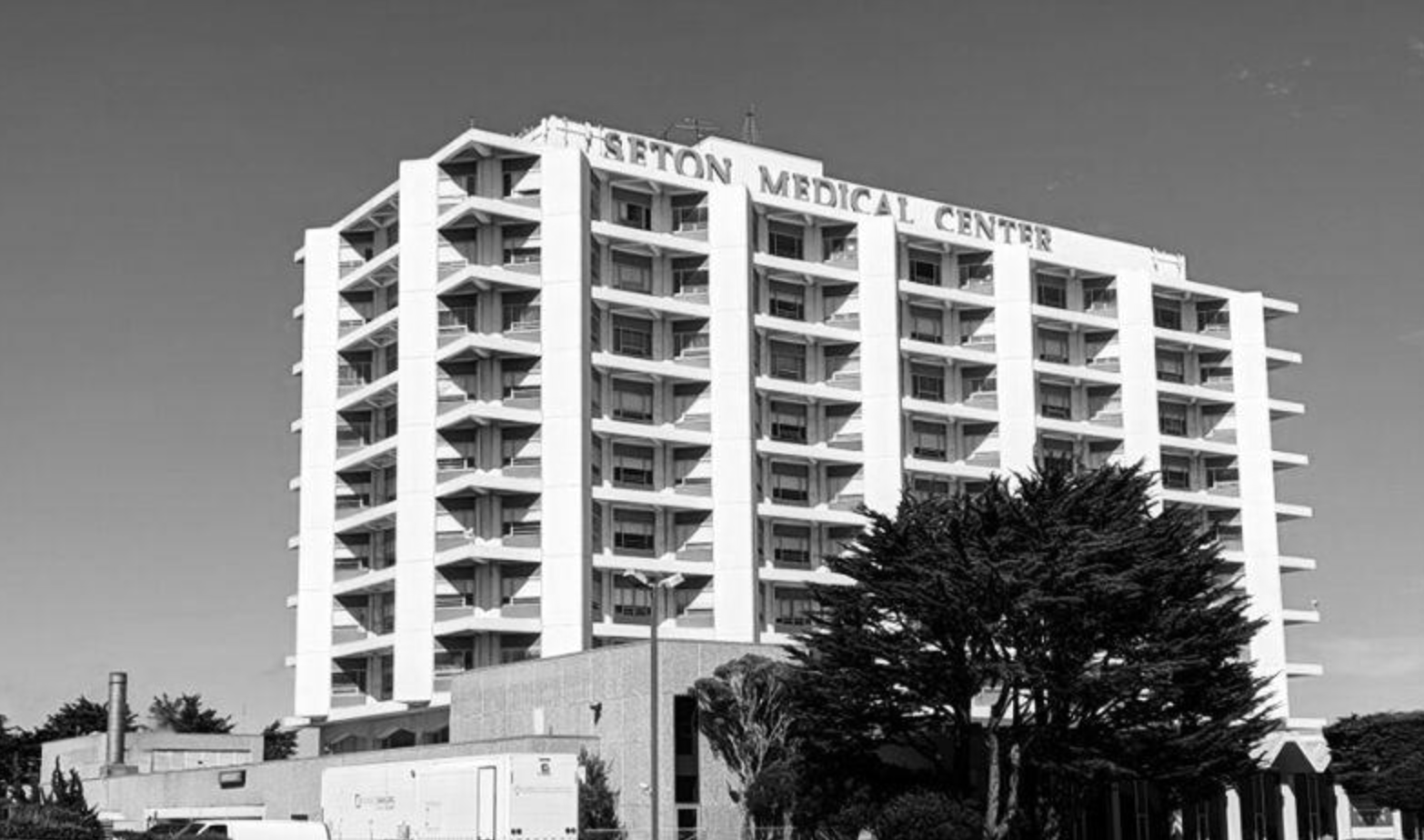

- Shown in California

Geography
- Location: 1900 Sullivan Ave., Daly City, California, United States
- Coordinates: 37.6799°N 122.4746°W

Organization
- Patron: Saint Elizabeth Ann Seton

Services
- Beds: 398

History
- Former name: Mary's Help Hospital
- Founded: 1893

Links
- Website: www.ahmchealth.com/smc/
- Lists: Hospitals in California

Seton Medical Center (originally Mary's Help Hospital) is a 398-bed hospital owned by AHMC Healthcare. Founded in San Francisco, the current facility is located in Daly City, California, United States. It is the largest employer in Daly City and is credited in part with attracting the initial influx of Filipino immigrants to the city, which has the highest concentration of Filipinos in the U.S.

Seton also operates Seton Coastside, a 116-bed skilled nursing facility with a 24-hour standby emergency department in Moss Beach.

== History ==
=== San Francisco period ===
In 1889 Kate Johnson, a wealthy San Francisco widow made donations to acquire land and build a "sunshine hospital" for women and children under the condition it be operated by the Daughters of Charity of Saint Vincent de Paul. It was built in San Francisco on Guerrero Street. Johnson was impressed with their work with "orphans, beggars, prisoners, the sick, refugees, and the mentally ill" during her European travels. The medical center was founded as Mary's Help Hospital in 1893 by the Daughters of Charity of the Society of Saint Vincent de Paul and a new building, located at 145 Guerrero Street at Brosnan Street (west of the Levi Strauss factory), by April 1906, was almost completed but destroyed shortly thereafter by the 1906 San Francisco earthquake. In 1912 Mary's Help Hospital officially opened as did its nursing school program. In 1913 this made it the largest private hospital in Northern California. The medical center offered free and partial payment services in addition to free food.

=== Daly City period ===
By the 1950s the hospital was becoming overwhelmed with over 30,000 patients annually, and an earthquake in 1957 that damaged the building led to a decision to build a new hospital. In 1965 a new hospital was built in Daly City as San Francisco was found to have a surplus while northern San Mateo County was in need of a medical center and emergency room services. The site was a hillside near Interstate 280 that was until that point a heather and field crops farm. The hospital was built in an area known as St. Francis Heights. It was designed like all previous incarnations to be a "sunshine hospital" meaning that every room had a windowed view into the exterior world where natural sunlight could make it to them.

In 1983 it was renamed in honor of Saint Elizabeth Ann Seton, the American founder of the Sisters of Charity. From 1995 to 2002, the hospital was managed by Catholic Healthcare West, a change opposed by nurses' unions. In 2002, the hospitals withdrew to become the independent Daughters of Charity Health System.

In 2011, Seton Medical Center was ranked fifth of forty-four Bay Area hospitals by U.S. News & World Report. In 2012 the hospital was fined $100,000 for causing the death of an elderly woman in a vegetative state when it inserted a breathing tube with the cap still on, leaving her unable to exhale. In 2012, Daly City mayor Sal Torres lauded the hospital for its 100th anniversary.

=== Ownership transition ===
In 2015, Daughters of Charity sold their hospitals to BlueMountain Capital Management and become Verity Health System, a secular nonprofit. Three years later, on August 31, 2018, Verity filed for Chapter 11 bankruptcy protection. KPC Group agreed to purchase Seton Medical Center and Seton Coastside for $70 million, but the sale was not completed by the court-mandated deadline of December 5.

In March 2020, Verity indicated plans to close Seton. Days later, the San Mateo County Board of Supervisors approved $20 million over four years to keep the hospital open. On March 19, Governor Gavin Newsom announced that the State of California would lease more than half the beds at Seton Medical Center for three months as part of its emergency response to the COVID-19 pandemic. Verity continued to operate the facility.

On April 22, 2020, bankruptcy courts approved the sale of Seton Medical Center and Seton Coastside to AHMC Healthcare for $40 million.
