= Drop Site News =

Independent news website

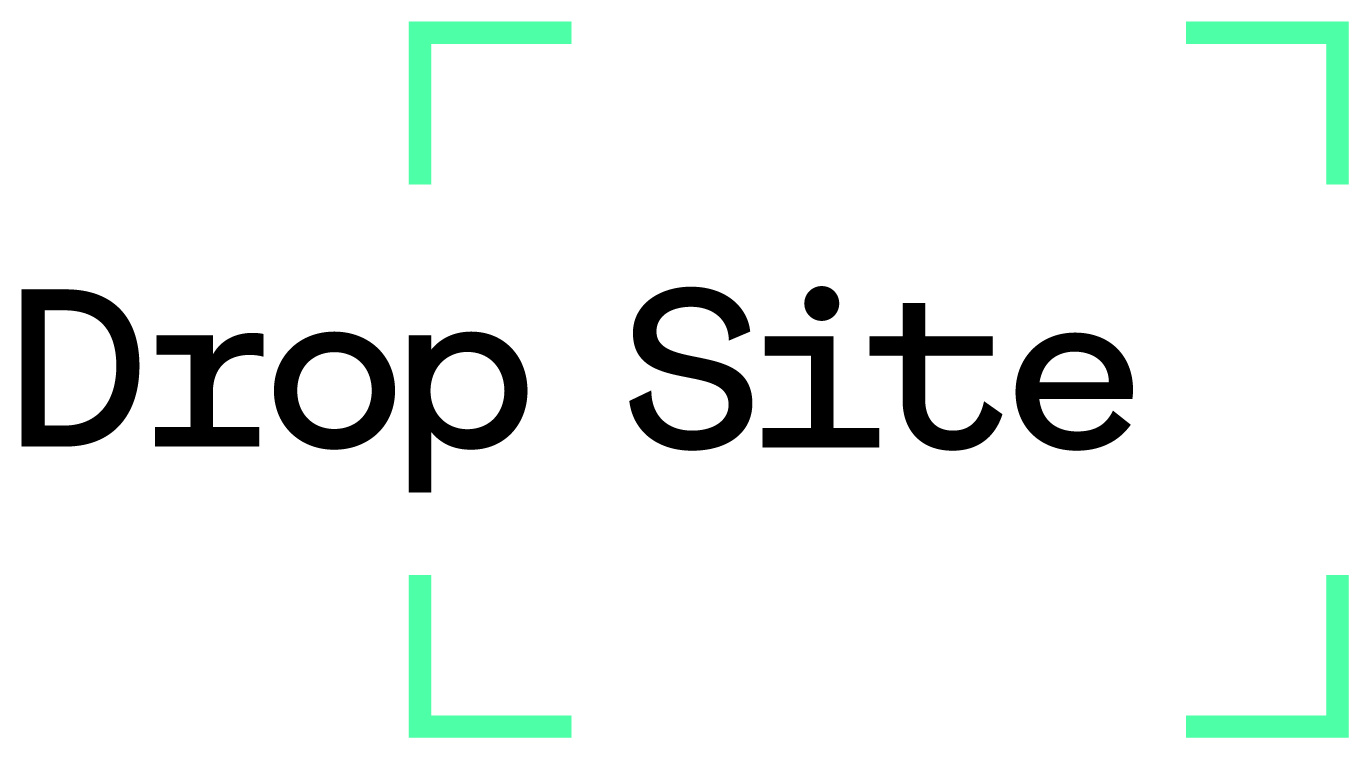
- Drop Site News logo
- Formation: July 2024; 2 years ago
- Founder: Jeremy Scahill and Ryan Grim
- Type: Nonprofit news outlet
- Purpose: Investigative reporting
- Official language: English
- Website: www.dropsitenews.com

Drop Site News is a nonprofit investigative news outlet founded by Ryan Grim and Jeremy Scahill in July 2024. It is based in Washington, D.C., United States. It describes itself as non-aligned. Other media organizations have described Drop Site News as an independent outlet. (Note: Sources describing Drop Site News as an independent outlet:)

== History ==
In July 2024, Ryan Grim and Jeremy Scahill founded Drop Site News, with Nausicaa Renner as a founding editor. All three formerly worked at The Intercept, which had seen significant staff turmoil and departures in the preceding months. The board of The Intercept rejected an offer from Grim and Scahill to take over the company. MENA editor Sharif Abdel Kouddous explained the position of the outlet, saying "Drop Site will cover the Democrats as critically as we will cover Republicans—we're not going to change depending on who's in power ... Our ethos is adversarial journalism."

The New York Times listed the establishment of Drop Site News along with Taylor Lorenz's User Mag, Oliver Darcy's Status, and 404 Media, founded by former staff of Vice Motherboard, as instances of "a series of journalists leaving legacy media institutions in recent years to strike out on their own".

In September 2025, Grim announced that Nika Soon-Shiong, daughter of Los Angeles Times owner Patrick Soon-Shiong, would serve as Drop Site News's publisher.

== Coverage ==
Grim has said that Drop Site News focuses broadly on "power and greed", with the Columbia Journalism Review writing that the outlet focuses on topics ranging from war zones to the January 2025 Southern California wildfires. Grim expressed a belief in the importance of alternative media in "debunking disinformation that often goes unchallenged by corporate journalism", citing his assertion that "many Israeli propaganda narratives fell apart under pressure from alternative media", such as claims that Hamas beheaded 40 babies or committed systemic rape during the October 7 attacks. Grim also said he began to "wonder about the histories that are written of so many previous conflicts" and how mainstream media shapes a narrative that becomes established as history.

In December 2024, citing 13 anonymous BBC staffers, Owen Jones reported for Drop Site News that BBC Middle East editor Raffi Berg was acting to skew coverage of the Gaza war in favor of Israel. The BBC denied the allegation. In November 2025, Berg sued Jones for libel, alleging Jones's article had damaged his reputation and resulted in "an onslaught of hatred, intimidation and threats". Jones responded, "I strongly disagree with Mr. Berg's accusations, and I look forward to vigorously defending my reporting in court."

In February 2025, Grim and Drop Site News reported that the U.S. State Department had allocated $400 million for "Armored Tesla" in a procurement document. After the story broke, the document was amended to read "Armored Electric Vehicles". The story prompted Senator Richard Blumenthal and Congressman Gregory Meeks to send Secretary of State Marco Rubio letters highlighting the conflict of interest in Elon Musk's role as CEO of Tesla while also working for the Department of Government Efficiency.

In September 2025, Drop Site News published leaked documents showing that the Commonwealth of Nations, which served as an election observer, hid a report of voting misconduct amid allegations of rigging in the 2024 Pakistani general election after the Pakistani government reportedly suggested the suppression of the report.

From September to November 2025, Grim and Murtaza Hussain wrote a series of stories on Jeffrey Epstein's connections with Israeli intelligence. One of them reported on an exchange between Epstein and Ehud Barak.

In January 2026, before the 2026 Iran war, Drop Site News reported that an anonymous U.S. intelligence official said President Donald Trump was planning to attack Iran and that the main objective was regime change by killing Iranian government leaders, destroying weapons, and using the momentum of the 2025–2026 Iranian protests to overthrow Iran's government.

== Censorship ==
On July 8, 2024, the Meta Platforms-owned social media platform Instagram took down several interviews about the Gaza war posted by Democracy Now!. An interview of Scahill by Amy Goodman on his interviews with Hamas officials for Drop Site News was among those taken down. Instagram's takedown notice said that the removed interviews included "symbols, praise, or support of people and organizations we define as dangerous".

In September 2024, Drop Site News reported that it was blocked in Pakistan after reporting in July on the Army Agahi Network, a secret online operation run by the Pakistan Army. Pakistan's military followed the ban with legal threats and accusations that Drop Site News is "being funded by Jew and Indian lobbies".

== Funding ==
The Intercept provided startup funding for Drop Site News. In November 2025, according to The Washington Free Beacon, the Open Society Foundations awarded $250,000 to the Social Security Works Education Fund, the nonprofit that acts as a fiscal sponsor for Drop Site News "to support establishing a Drop Site News MENA desk to bridge a critical information gap in independent journalism".

== Journalists ==
Drop Site's journalists include Grim, Hussain, Scahill, Renner, and Sharif Abdel Kouddous. Journalist Jasper Nathaniel has contributed to Drop Site News. During the Gaza war, Palestinian journalist Hossam Shabat reported from the northern Gaza Strip for Drop Site News before he was killed in March 2025.

== Reception and recognition ==
Drop Site News has been described as an independent news organization. It has been characterized by Semafor as left-leaning.

In February 2025, Meghnad Bose wrote in the Columbia Journalism Review that Drop Site has blended reporting with advocacy, including campaigning for a book by Refaat Alareer and petitioning for the release of Hussam Abu Safiya. Bose said that the outlet does not seek out all perspectives equally and its investigations adopt a skeptical posture toward official institutions. That March, Current Affairs called Drop Site News one of several media outlets that "produce excellent original reporting that holds power to account".

In November 2025, Jeet Heer of The Nation, commenting on U.S. press coverage of Jeffrey Epstein's links to Israel, wrote, "The blockbuster reporting in Reason and Drop Site has not been matched by any comparable investigations in The New York Times or The Washington Post, on CNN or the major networks."

In February 2025, the Palestine Laboratory Podcast, hosted by investigative journalist Antony Loewenstein of Drop Site News, was a finalist for the Melbourne Press Club's Quill Award for best podcast. Lila Hassan's investigation "Archiving Gaza: The Race to Save Evidence of War Crimes and Mass Destruction", published by Drop Site News, was nominated for the 2026 True Story Award.
