= Antony Loewenstein =

Australian freelance investigative journalist, author, and filmmaker (born 1974)

- Born: 1974 (age 51–52); Australia
- Citizenship: Australia; Germany
- Occupations: Journalist; Author; Documentary filmmaker
- Writing career
- Genre: Non-fiction
- Subjects: Politics; Israel–Palestine; War on drugs
- Notable works: The Palestine Laboratory; Disaster Capitalism

Antony Loewenstein (born 1974) is a Australian journalist, author, and filmmaker. He writes frequently on the Israeli–Palestinian conflict, including critiques of Zionism and Israeli policy, and won the 2023 Walkley Book Award for The Palestine Laboratory: How Israel Exports the Technology of Occupation Around the World.

== Early life ==
Antony Loewenstein was born in Australia in 1974. His paternal grandparents left Germany and Austria just before World War II, but many members of their family had been killed in the Holocaust.

== Career ==
Loewenstein has written for a number of publications, including The Guardian and Sydney Morning Herald.

Loewenstein contributed a chapter to Margo Kingston's 2004 book Not Happy, John, which highlighted the growing disenchantment with Australian prime minister John Howard. His 2006 book, My Israel Question, was a best-seller and shortlisted for a 2007 New South Wales Premier's Literary Award. The book was criticised in a review in Australian Jewish News.

He is the co-editor with Ahmed Moor of the 2012 book After Zionism: One State for Israel and Palestine which includes essays by Omar Barghouti, John Mearsheimer, Ilan Pappé, Sara Roy, and Jonathan Cook, among others.

With South African filmmaker Naashon Zalk, Loewenstein was co-director of a 2019 Al Jazeera English documentary on abuse of the opioid drug tramadol in Nigeria, West Africa's Opioid Crisis. He appears in the 2019 documentary, This Is Not A Movie, about The Independent's Middle East correspondent, Robert Fisk. His 2019 book, Pills, Powder and Smoke, is on the global "war on drugs".

Loewenstein co-founded Independent Australian Jewish Voices (IAJV).

In 2019 he was awarded the Jerusalem (Al Quds) Peace Prize, which "recognises the inspirational and lifelong contributions of an individual advocating for Palestinian freedom, justice and self-determination".

In 2021, he co-founded Declassified Australia with fellow journalist Peter Cronau. The news website critically reports on Australia's relations with the world. He and UK film-maker Dan Davies co-directed the Al Jazeera documentary Under the Cover of Covid.

In 2023, he published The Palestine Laboratory: How Israel Exports The Technology Of Occupation Around The World, in the UK, US, and Australia, with multiple, translated editions. It was a long-list finalist in the 2023 Moore Prize For Human Rights Writing, and a best-selling book across the world. In November 2023 Loewenstein was awarded, in partnership with Banki Haddock Fiora, the Walkley Book Award for Longform Journalism for the book. The book won the People's Choice award and was also shortlisted for the 2024 Victorian Premier's Prize for Nonfiction and the Nonfiction Book Award at the 2024 Queensland Literary Awards.

In 2024, he released a podcast series, The Palestine Laboratory, with the US outlet, Drop Site News.

In 2025, he released a two-part TV documentary based on his best-selling book, The Palestine Laboratory, made with the UK production company, Black Leaf Films. It was broadcast by Al Jazeera English. In the same year, he also released the documentary film, Germany's Israel Obsession, again with Black Leaf Films and Al Jazeera English.

In late 2025, he launched The Antony Loewenstein Podcast, a weekly program on politics.

He is currently writing a new investigative book on Israel/Palestine, to be released in late 2027. His research was facilitated by an award of the Neilma Sidney Literary Travel Fund and Walkley Foundation to travel to Israel and Palestine.

== Personal life ==
Loewenstein became a German citizen, while maintaining Australian citizenship, as an adult in 2011, "as a way to rightfully re-claim our birthright", to honour his family that came from Germany, and to be allowed to work in European Union countries. However, he said in 2013 that he feels neither Australian nor German, describing himself as a "non-practising Jewish atheist currently based in Sydney".

== Bibliography ==
=== Books ===
- The blogging revolution. Melbourne University Publishing. 2008.
- My Israel Question : Reframing The Israel/Palestine Conflict. Melbourne University Publishing. 1 September 2009. ISBN 978-0-522-85945-4.
- Profits of Doom: How vulture capitalism is swallowing the world. Melbourne University Publishing. 1 August 2014. pp. 1–. ISBN 978-0-522-86723-7.
- Profits of Doom. Melbourne University Publishing. 6 May 2024. ISBN 9780522866827.
- Disaster Capitalism: Making a killing out of catastrophe. London New York Verso Books. 2015. ISBN 978-1-78478-116-3.
- Pills, Powder, and Smoke: Inside the Bloody War on Drugs. Scribe. 2019. ISBN 9781925713367.
- The Palestine Laboratory: How Israel exports the technology of occupation around the world. Scribe. 2023. ISBN 9781922310408.

Contributor

- Kingston, Margo. Not Happy, John defending Australia's democracy. Paperback, 240 pages. Penguin Books, (2004) ISBN 0-14-300258-9.
- Antony Loewenstein; Jane Caro; Rachel Woodlock; Simon Smart (1 July 2013). For God's Sake. Pan Macmillan Australia. ISBN 978-1-74328-913-6.

Editor

- Antony Loewenstein, Ahmed Moor, eds. After Zionism: One State for Israel and Palestine, Saqi, (2012), ISBN 9780863568398
- Jeff Sparrow; Antony Loewenstein, eds. (2012). Left Turn: Political Essays for the New Left. Melbourne Univ. Publishing. pp. 5–. ISBN 978-0-522-86143-3.

=== Critical studies and reviews of Loewenstein's work ===
The blogging revolution

- O'Reilly, Brendan (Autumn 2009). "Past the gatekeepers". Overland. 194: 87.
