= AHMC Healthcare =

Hospital corporation in California

Coordinates: 34.0974°N 118.1219°W

AHMC Healthcare Inc. is a for-profit privately held hospital corporation based in the Greater San Gabriel Valley of California. Dr. Jonathan Wu is the founder and chairman of AHMC.

AHMC operates over 2,000 beds at its 10 healthcare facilities and employs over 10,000 caregivers.

== Hospitals ==
AHMC owns and operates the following hospitals:

Hospital	City	State	Beds	Acquired	Acquired from	Opened
Alhambra Hospital Medical Center	Alhambra	California	144	1998	Alhambra Redevelopment Agency	1920
Anaheim Regional Medical Center	Anaheim	California	223	2009	MemorialCare Health System	1958
Garfield Medical Center	Monterey Park	California	210	2004	Tenet Healthcare	1927
Greater El Monte Community Hospital	South El Monte	California	117	2004	Tenet Healthcare	1974
Monterey Park Hospital	Monterey Park	California	101	2004	Tenet Healthcare	1972
Whittier Hospital Medical Center	Whittier	California	178	2004	Tenet Healthcare	1957
San Gabriel Valley Medical Center	San Gabriel	California	273	2007	Dignity Health	1960
Doctors Hospital of Riverside	Riverside	California	223	2019	Parkview Community Hospital Medical Center	1958
Seton Medical Center	Daly City	California	398	2021	Verity Health System	1893
Seton Medical Center Coastside	Moss Beach	California	116	2021	Verity Health System	1970

- Alhambra Hospital Medical Center is operated under a long-term agreement.

== See also ==
- List of hospitals in California
