= NantOmics =

NantOmics, LLC
- Company type: Limited liability
- Industry: Biotechnology, molecular diagnostics
- Founded: 2013
- Founder: Patrick Soon-Shiong
- Headquarters: Culver City, California, United States
- Products: Molecular diagnostic products
- Website: https://nantomics.com

NantOmics is a biotechnology company based in Culver City, California, which provides molecular diagnostic products for personalized cancer treatment. It is part of the NantWorks network, a corporation consisting of different startups in the medical and health industry.

== History ==
NantOmics was founded in 2013 by billionaire Patrick Soon-Shiong. In 2015 NantOmics bought the cancer diagnostics company OncoPlex Dx. In 2017 the company acquired the consumer genomics startup Genos. Three years later, in 2020, NantOmics shutdown Genos.

== Products ==
GPS Cancer involves sequencing of the genome and RNA of tumor cells in comparison to normal cells from the same individual in order to develop personalized treatments. About 327,000 cancer patients participated in a GPS cancer pilot project in 2017.
