= NantHealth =

Software solutions company in the healthcare industry

NantHealth, Inc.
- Company type: Public
- Traded as: OTCQB: NHIQ; Nasdaq: NH (2016–23)
- Industry: Healthcare
- Founded: 2007; 19 years ago
- Founder: Patrick Soon-Shiong
- Key people: Patrick Soon-Shiong (CEO); Paul Holt (CFO)
- Revenue: ▲US$95.961 million (2019)
- Operating income: ▲US$57.539 million (2019)
- Net income: ▲US$62.762 million (2019)
- Total assets: ▼US$266.487 million (2019)
- Total equity: ▼US$323.623 million (2019)
- Number of employees: 340 (2021)
- Website: www.nanthealth.com

NantHealth, Inc. is a provider of software solutions for the healthcare industry, including NaviNet for insurance companies and decision support systems targeted at healthcare. The publicly traded company is headquartered in Winterville, North Carolina.

The company was founded by Patrick Soon-Shiong.

His investment portfolio NantWorks controlled 62% of the voting shares of NantHealth at the end of 2021. Other notable early investors included Allscripts, BlackBerry, Kuwait Investment Authority, Celgene, and Verizon.

In September 2014, NantHealth was featured as the cover story in Forbes Magazine, which estimated NantHealth's market capitalization at $1.6 billion. In December 2014, NantHealth was featured on 60 Minutes by Sanjay Gupta. In August 2017, NantHealth signed a distribution agreement for GPS Cancer with Asia Genomics.

In January 2019, NantHealth received a delisting warning from Nasdaq "because the Company’s common stock failed to maintain a minimum closing bid price of $1.00 for 30 consecutive business days." At the time, the market value of the company was approximately $57m. The company made a 1-for-15 reverse stock split in December, 2022.
