= 'Not happy, John!' campaign =

2004 Campaign to remove John Howard as prime minister

The 'Not happy, John!' campaign was an, ultimately unsuccessful, Australian political campaign to oppose the re-election of then Liberal prime minister John Howard as member for Bennelong in the 2004 Australian federal election, which would have made him ineligible to be prime minister. The title of the campaign was coined by journalist Margo Kingston, and the campaign led by John Valder, the former president of the Liberal Party.

== Background and campaign ==
The campaign did not promote any specific candidate; instead, it called for votes for any other candidate standing against Howard. The title of the campaign is based on the book Not Happy, John by Australian Journalist Margo Kingston, which was in turn inspired by popular television commercial "Not happy, Jan!".

The campaign focused on ousting the Prime Minister as a member of the House of Representatives, with motives and desired outcomes ranging between activists. Andrew Wilkie, then a former public servant and whistleblower, stood in the seat as the Greens candidate, increasing his party's vote share by 12.34% to 16.37%.

On the other side of the political spectrum was John Valder, the former president of the Liberal Party and campaign leader, who wanted a Liberal government, only not led by Howard. Valder, a former ally of Howard, was turned from him after his treatment of asylum seekers in the Iraq war, describing him of "deceptively cunning language aimed at misleading us all", and donated $20,000 to the campaign in seed funding.

Though the campaign centred around the seat the seat of John Howard, other activists contested other seats. Another influential figure in the movement was Brian Deegan a former magistrate, moved to activism by the loss of his son, Josh, in the 2002 Bali bombings. He stood against Alexander Downer, the then Foreign Minister, in his seat of Mayo, due to Deegan believing that the government was responsible for the attack. Downer in response said he had compassion for Deegan, and denied his claims of responsibility.

Other supporters of the campaign included: Alex Broun playwright and Convenor for Artists Against Howard, and Nicole Campbell (Labor Party candidate). The campaign was launched on 22 June 2004 and continued until the election on 9 October.

The campaign sold paraphernalia, including stickers, bumper stickers, T-shirts, and leaflets. Stunts were also performed, such as putting the campaign's name in the air using skywriting.

== Result and legacy ==
The campaign was unsuccessful, in that Howard was returned as member, but had some success in that it reduced Howard's majority by 3% in the face of a 2% swing to Howard's Liberal Party, and he did lose the seat as sitting prime minister in the subsequent election. However, neither Valder nor Wilkie initially believed that Howard could be unseated.

There was a small 'Not Happy, John' campaign for the 2007 election based on the philosophy behind the original campaign. Valder discussed the increased displeasure of the electorate since 2004 on issues such as the David Hicks affair and the Iraq War. The possibility of unseating Howard had increased further since the reduction in margin in 2004 due to an unfavourable redistribution, that resulted in a very slight loss of margin. Howard did end up losing his seat, though the 'Not Happy, John' campaign was on a much less organised than the last: with Valder focusing his attention on the seat of Wentworth, endorsing Labor's George Newhouse. Kingston wrote a follow-up book 'Still not happy, John!' to coincide with the 2007 election.
