= Ian Gordon (general) =

Australian general

- Born: 20 March 1952 (age 74); Perth, Western Australia
- Military career
- Allegiance: Australia
- Branch: Australian Army
- Service years: 1970–2009
- Rank: Major General
- Commands: United Nations Truce Supervision Organization (2006–09); Deputy Chief of Army (2004–06); Training Command (2002–04); Australian Command and Staff College (1998–99); 1st Signal Regiment (1990–91)
- Conflicts: Western Sahara; East Timor; United Nations Truce Supervision Organization
- Awards: Officer of the Order of Australia

Major General Ian Campbell Gordon, AO (born 20 March 1952) is a retired senior officer of the Australian Army. He had a long and distinguished career culminating as Deputy Chief of Army (2004–2006) and Chief of Staff of the United Nations Truce Supervision Organization (2006–2008).

== Early life and education ==
Ian Campbell Gordon was born in Perth, Western Australia, on 20 March 1952 to Glenice Pascoe and Ivor Gordon, a decorated bomber pilot who flew with No. 455 Squadron RAAF in the Second World War.

Educated at Swanbourne High School, Gordon entered the Royal Military College, Duntroon as an officer cadet in 1970. He graduated in 1973 with a Bachelor of Science in Military Studies, and was commissioned as a lieutenant in the Royal Australian Corps of Signals.

== Military career ==
Gordon graduated from the Royal Military College, Duntroon, in 1973 and was commissioned into the Royal Australian Corps of Signals. He graduated from the Royal Military College of Science in Shrivenham, United Kingdom, in 1983, and from the Australian Command and Staff College in 1985.

By 1990, Gordon was posted to command the 1st Signals Regiment in Brisbane. The following year, he was made commander of the Australian Service Contingent to the United Nations Mission for the Referendum in Western Sahara (MINURSO). For his command of the 1st Signals Regiment and work with MINURSO, Gordon was appointed a Member of the Order of Australia in 1992. In 1993, Gordon was named Director of the Royal Australian Corps of Signals. He graduated from the Australian Centre for Defence and Strategic Studies in 1996 and, in 1998, was appointed Commandant of the Australian Command and Staff College. He was appointed Director-General Personnel – Army in 2000, and Director-General, Future Land Warfare in 2001. That September, he was promoted to major general and appointed Deputy Force Commander in the United Nations Transitional Administration in East Timor (UNTAET).

Gordon returned to Australia in 2002 and was appointed Commander, Training Command – Army. He became Deputy Chief of Army in May 2004, and was appointed an Officer of the Order of Australia for his distinguished service to the Australian Defence Force in senior command and staff appointments in January 2006. In November the same year, he was appointed Chief of Staff of the United Nations Truce Supervision Organization (UNTSO).

== Other activities ==
After retirement, Gordon has owned and managed a small publishing business, Barrallier Books (delisted 2020), which had a focus on deluxe books and fine writing.

In the early 2020s, Gordon was patron of the Australia Palestine Advocacy Network. Mashni became president in January 2023.

== Personal ==
Gordon married Ula and they have three children. His hobbies include scuba diving and restoring cars.

Military offices
Preceded by Major General Frank Roberts	Deputy Chief of Army; 2004–2006	Succeeded by Major General John Cantwell
Preceded by Major General Clive Lilley	Chief of Staff, United Nations Truce Supervision Organization; 2006–2008	Succeeded by Major General Robert Mood
