= Abraxis BioScience =

Former biopharmaceutical and nano-medicine company

- Industry: Pharmaceutical
- Founded: 2001; 25 years ago in Los Angeles, California
- Founder: Dr. Patrick Soon-Shiong
- Defunct: 2010
- Headquarters: Los Angeles, United States
- Key people: Mr. Rick Click (Chief Information Officer and Global IT Officer); Dr. Nguyen V. Dat Ph.D. (vice president of Clinical Research)
- Products: Protein-based therapeutics and technologies for treatment of cancer and other critical illnesses
- Brands: Abraxane
- Services: Cancer drugs
- Revenue: ▲US$359 million (2009)
- Operating income: ▼US$−113 million (2009)
- Net income: ▼US$−104 million (2009)
- Total assets: ▼US$1.068 billion (2009)
- Total equity: ▼US$846 million (2009)
- Owner: Celgene
- Number of employees: 885 (2009)

Abraxis BioScience was a global biopharmaceutical, and nano-medicine company that developed treatments for critically ill patients. It had over 2000 employees worldwide in 2007. Abraxis's portfolio included the world's first protein-based nanoparticle chemotherapeutic compound, called nab Technology. From this the company developed Abraxane, a treatment for metastatic breast cancer.

In 2010, Abraxis BioScience was acquired by Celgene Corporation.

== History ==
Abraxis was incorporated in 2001 in Los Angeles. It was formerly known as American Pharmaceutical Partners (APP), which as known for its injectable oncology, anti-infective and critical care. Besides cancer treatments, it provided treatment for multiple sclerosis, Alzheimer's, and some cardiovascular diseases. It had manufacturing plants in Melrose Park, Illinois and Phoenix, Arizona. By 2005, Dr. Patrick Soon-Shiong merged American BioScience and the publicly-held APP, naming it Abraxis BioScience. Under this new name, seventy-four trials were undertaken to test Abraxane against various cancer targets. The drug, which was approved by the FDA in 2005, was the subject of a litigation (Elan Pharma v. Abraxis BioScience) for patent infringement. In 2008, Abraxis was ordered to pay $55.2 million to Elan.

In August 2007, Abraxis announced it would again undergo a restructuring to separate its "hospital-based products business" from its "proprietary products business" into two public companies; this would involve the merging of Abraxis Oncology and Abraxis Research sub-units to form a new Abraxis Bioscience (Abraxis Bioscience, Inc., Nasdaq: ABII), and the spinoff of Abraxis Pharmaceutical Products (APP, Inc., Nasdaq: APPX). This reorganization was completed in November 2007. During the reorganization, the new Abraxis Bioscience was known briefly as New Abraxis.

In 2010, Abraxis BioScience was acquired by Celgene Corporation. Per Celgene's website, as of at least 2016 Abraxis no longer exists as a named division within Celgene.
