= The View from Greenhaven =

2008 Australian film

- Directed by: Kenn MacRae; Simon MacRae
- Written by: Kenn MacRae; Simon MacRae
- Produced by: Nancy Baye; Darlene Choo; Michael De Sadeleer
- Starring: Chris Haywood; Wendy Hughes; Susan Prior; Russell Dykstra; Rhonda Doyle; Geoff Morrell; Steve Bisley; John Gregg; Annie Byron; Carole Skinner
- Cinematography: Mark Wareham
- Edited by: Tim Wellburn
- Music by: Rajan Kamahl
- Production company: Movie Extra
- Distributed by: Arkles Entertainment
- Release date: 16 October 2008
- Running time: 101 minutes
- Country: Australia
- Language: English

The View from Greenhaven is a 2008 Australian comedy-drama film directed by Kenn and Simon MacRae, starring Chris Haywood and Wendy Hughes.

== Cast ==
- Chris Haywood as Dashiell
- Wendy Hughes as Dorothy
- Susan Prior as Kate
- Russell Dykstra as Tim
- Edward Wills as Terry
- Nathan Cameron as Harry
- Angie Diaz as Sarah
- Rhonda Doyle as Sylvia
- Adam Ray as Bob
- Geoff Morrell as Theodore
- John Gregg as Tobe
- Steve Bisley as Lach
- Annie Byron as Clare
- Carole Skinner as Bonny

== Synopsis ==
Dash and Dot are about reaching their forty year wedding anniversary. Their daughter Kate and her husband Tim have arranged a mystery tour to celebrate the occasion. Dash is not happy at the idea, but Dot gives him an ultimatum. He’s even less happy when he meets their fellow travellers.

== Release ==
The film was released on 16 October 2008.

== Reception ==
Film critic Margaret Pomeranz of At the Movies gave the film three stars and called it "a coming of a ripe old age story." She went on to say: "And while it has its charms, largely in the performances, there is something of the telemovie about the film. Chris Haywood is just so good as Dash, he brings something poignant to a character that could have just been a cliché. And Wendy Hughes is also splendid. Perhaps the characters are a bit underwritten, but this is a feel good film that is not wildly ambitious."

Annette Basile of FilmInk wrote that the film "will put a smile on your face and make its way into your heart." George Palathingal of The Sydney Morning Herald wrote that "With any luck, the MacRaes will think their next project through more carefully. It's all well and good knowing how to tell a story; it's another matter getting people to pay attention."

Jake Wilson of The Age called the film "thinly imaged though efficiently constructed". Jason Di Rosso of Radio Australia wrote that while Haywood and Hughes are "good in the lead roles", the rest of the characters "just aren't original or interesting enough" and the "emotional watershed at the end, too, feels a little simplistic."
