= Misery Guts =

Australian children's television series

- Genre: Children; Comedy drama
- Starring: Paul Giles; Brooke Harman; Alan Cinis; Rhonda Doyle
- Country of origin: Australia
- Original language: English
- No. of seasons: 1
- No. of episodes: 13

Production
- Running time: 30 minutes
- Production company: Barron Entertainment

Original release
- Network: Nine Network
- Release: 24 December 1998 – 1 February 1999

Misery Guts is an Australian children's television series on the Nine Network that first screened in 1998. The series is based on the book by Morris Gleitzman.

== Premise ==
Vin and Marge Shipley live above a fish and chip shop in South London, with their only son Keith. Things are tough in South London and Keith wants to make his misery guts parents smile again, so he buys a brilliantly coloured tropical fish from Australia. All his efforts to cheer his parents fail, so Keith decides he must find a way to get his parents to Australia, where the sun shines all the time. At some point, Keith accidentally burns down his parents' shop. The Shipleys decide to migrate to Australia with the insurance money. They arrive at Orchid Cove, a small fictional town in Australia. Keith believes it is a paradise. He meets a girl, around his age, named Tracy.

The Shipleys open a new fish and chip shop in Orchid Cove named Paradise Fish 'n' Chips and Tracy introduces Keith to some interesting activities in Orchid Cove, such as surfing. The Shipleys' new shop is getting along and the Shipleys become friends with Wogga, Tracy's father and Dougie, the mechanic. Arrogant businessman Arnold Flashman opens up a rival fish and chip shop named Ocean Fresh Fish 'n' Fries near the Shipleys' store. The people who work there are frauds who don't catch their own fish or make their own chips. However they still have better equipment than the Shipleys do, which worries the Shipleys. To make matters worse, a storm hits the shop and damages most of the equipment. However, Keith thinks of something. With the help of Tracy, he decides to paint the shop to attract new customers.

As competition grows, Keith decides to support his family further by sneaking out to discover opals in the opal fields in Southern Australia. On his way, he is kidnapped by Coal, a trucker, and servo station owner, Mic. Mic releases Keith on the promise that Keith paints a picture of Coal's truck. Seeing the beautiful image, Coal decides to give Keith a ride to the opal fields. Meanwhile, Tracy finds out that Keith has been kidnapped and informs Wogga. Wogga decides to follow Vin and Marge Shipley, who have already started to look for Keith. Eventually, Tracy finds Keith in a tunnel. Frustrated, Keith digs at the tunnel furiously, which leads to the collapse of the tunnel. Tracy happened to bring her dog Buster with her, and with Buster's help, both Keith and Tracy are able to escape. Tracy, Wogga, Keith, Marge and Vin are happily reunited.

After returning home, a frustrated and devastated Vin decides to sell his shop to Flashman. Keith begs him not to sell the shop and decides to organize a Fish 'n' Chips Championship to determine the best Fish 'n' chips maker in Orchid Cove. The judge who is Baz, the town's police sergeant, rules that Paradise Fish 'n' Chips are better than Ocean Fresh Fish 'n' Fries and the Shipleys' shop stays in business, while Flashman leaves Orchid Cove for good. The series ends with a joyful play between Keith and Tracy, who informs Keith that until he told her, she did not know that she was living in a paradise.

== Cast ==
- Paul Giles as Keith Shipley
- Brooke Harman as Tracy
- Alan Cinis as Vincent "Vin" Shipley
- Rhonda Doyle as Marge Shipley
- Brett Sellwood as Dennis
- Reece Williamson as Doopy Ann
- Andrew Windsor as Dougie
- Peter Marshall as Wogga, Tracy's father
- Malcolm Cork as Baz, the police sergeant
- Mark Hembrow as Arnold Flashman, owner of Ocean Fresh Fish 'n' Fries
- Christine Amor as Mrs Herman

== Reception ==
Jenny Tabakoff wrote in The Sydney Morning Herald that it's "an engaging show, very British in its early episodes", and is "way above average". She complimented the acting and the effects as being "imaginative", and that she "likes the way the camera drags out some images and uses lighting to give a surreal look to the London scenes".

== See also ==
- List of Australian television series
