= Marion Maddox =

Australian academic and political commentator (1965–2025)

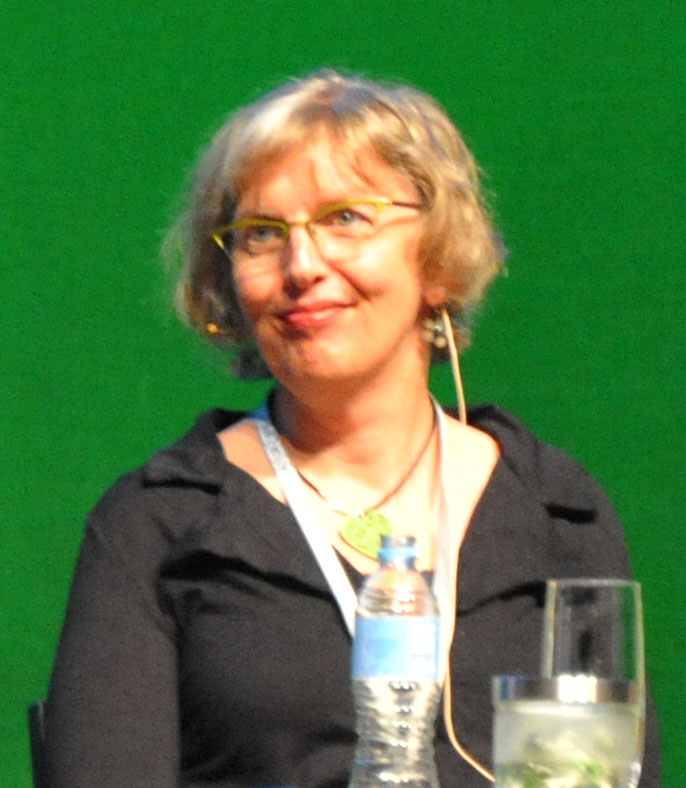
- Maddox at the 2012 Global Atheist Convention
- Born: 3 February 1965
- Died: 16 September 2025 (aged 60)
- Occupations: Professor, author

Marion Maddox FAHA (3 February 1965 – 16 September 2025) was an Australian author, academic, and political commentator. She was a professor in the department of Modern History, Politics and International Relations at Macquarie University. She was a regular commentator on issues of religion and politics in the Australian media and was a member of the Uniting Church. She authored the book God Under Howard: The rise of the religious right in Australian politics which compared the Howard Government with the religious right in the United States and criticised the decline of mainstream Christianity in Australia.

Maddox was born on 3 February 1965, to Shirley and Bob Maddox. She received doctorates in theology and political philosophy from Flinders University and the University of New South Wales respectively. She is also the recipient of an Australian Parliamentary Fellowship.

Maddox worked at Victoria University of Wellington, New Zealand, the Universities of Adelaide and South Australia.

In 2002, the Australian Association for the Study of Religion (AASR) Women's Caucus invited Maddox to give the annual Penny Magee Memorial Lecture. The title of her lecture was "All in the Family: Women, Religion and the Australian Right".

In November 2017, Maddox was elected fellow of the Australian Academy of the Humanities.

Maddox married Michael Symons, having two children together. She died on 16 September 2025, aged 60. Her funeral was held on 3 October.

== Selected bibliography ==
- God Under Howard: The rise of the religious right in Australian politics, ISBN 1-74114-568-6
- Taking God to School: The end of Australia's egalitarian education?, ISBN 978-1-74331-571-2

Australian Parliamentary Library

- For God and Country: Religious Dynamics in Australian Federal Politics, Monograph 07, 2001–02
- Indigenous Religion in Secular Australia, Research Paper 11, 1999–2000
- Does a Preamble Need a God?, Research Paper 8, 1999–2000
