= Stuart Rees =

- Awards: Order of Australia
- Scientific career
- Fields: Peace and Conflict Studies
- Workplaces: University of Sydney

Stuart Rees AM is an Australian academic, human rights activist and author who is the founder of the Sydney Peace Foundation and emeritus professor at the Centre for Peace and Conflict Studies at the University of Sydney in Australia.

== Early life and education ==
Stuart Rees holds a Bachelor of Arts with Honours, a Diploma of Social Studies, a Certificate of Social Casework and a Doctor of Philosophy.

== Career ==
From 1978 to 2000 Rees was professor of social work and social policy at the University of Sydney. For years Rees taught a post-graduate unit titled "Passion, Peace and Poetry" at the Centre for Peace and Conflict Studies, in which he integrated poetry with a study of the great non-violence leaders such as Gandhi and Martin Luther King. A similar use of poetry to illustrate the theme of peace with justice runs through many of his publications.

Prior to this he taught at University of Aberdeen and University of Southampton in the United Kingdom, at University of Toronto and Wilfrid Laurier University in Canada, and at the University of California, Berkeley and the University of Texas at Austin in the United States.

== Other activities ==
For six years Rees was a member of the Aboriginal Reconciliation Council of New South Wales. He has also been a council member of the Toda Research Institute into Global Governance and Human Security. Between 2004 and 2010, Rees chaired the NSW Energy Council.

He has been a human rights activist in several countries and his non-academic activities have included community development, probation services and social work in the UK and Canada; work with War on Poverty programs in the U.S.A.; and work with the Save the Children non-governmental organisation in India and Sri Lanka; co-architect of the West Papua Social Justice project; and co architect of the Sri Lankan project for the human rights of the Tamil minority.

Rees is a regular broadcaster on Australia's ABC Radio about the "means and meaning of peace with justice" is also a regular New Matilda contributor. Rees has been a regular convenor at "Politics in the Pub".

In 2012, Rees spoke about Pablo Picasso as a lifelong advocate of peace at the Art Gallery NSW (Art After Hours).

Rees is an active supporter of the worldwide Boycott, Divestment and Sanctions (BDS) movement which promotes Palestinian peoples' rights to self-determination. Rees has defended his efforts to convince the University of Sydney to sever ties with Israeli institutions. At a rally held in August 2013, Rees was personally supported by Australian MP David Shoebridge. In 2013, Rees sharply criticised Julia Gillard for signing the London Declaration on Combating Anti-Semitism. Rees described Gillard's signing of the declaration as "childish, thoughtless but easily populist."

== Publications ==
Rees' publications include numerous books and over one hundred journal articles on social justice, health care and welfare services, critiques of free market economics, the human costs of management practices and the attributes of peace negotiations and humanitarianism in social policy. Rees has also published three anthologies of poetry: The Jury's Return (1992), Tell Me the Truth About War (2004), and A Will to Live (2014).

== Recognition and honours ==
Rees' awards include a Simon Fellowship at the University of Manchester, a Humanities Fellowship at the City University of Hong Kong, and an honorary doctorate, and the Award of Highest Honour for "Significant Contributions to World Peace" conferred in 1998 by Soka University, Japan.

For four years he was an elected Fellow of the Senate of the University of Sydney.

In 2005 he was awarded a Member of the Order of Australia for service to international relations, particularly as Director of the Centre for Peace and Conflict Studies at the University of Sydney and through the establishment of the Sydney Peace Prize.

In 2018 he was awarded the inaugural Jerusalem (Al Quds) Peace Prize by the Australia Palestine Advocacy Network.

== Bibliography ==
- Social Work Face to Face (1979)
- Verdicts on Social Work (1982)
- A Brutal Game: Patients and the Doctors' Dispute (1986)
- Achieving Power: Practice and Policy in Social Welfare (1991)
- The Jury's Return (1992)
- Beyond the Market: Alternatives to Economic Rationalism (1993)
- The Human Costs of Managerealism: Advocating the Recovery of Humanity (1995)
- Human Rights, Corporate Responsibility: A Dialogue (2000)
- Passion for Peace: Exercising Power Creatively (2003)
- Tell Me The Truth About War (2004)
- Inspirations for Peace: Pablo Picasso, Noam Chomsky and their Friends (2012)
- Gandhi Legacy: The International Priorities (2013)
- A Will To Live (2014)
- A Conversation on the Philosophy of Peace and the Poetic Spirit(A dialogue between Dr. Daisaku Ikeda and Dr. Stuart Rees)(2014)
- A Lover's Country (2016)
