= Marymount High School =

Catholic school in Los Angeles, California, US

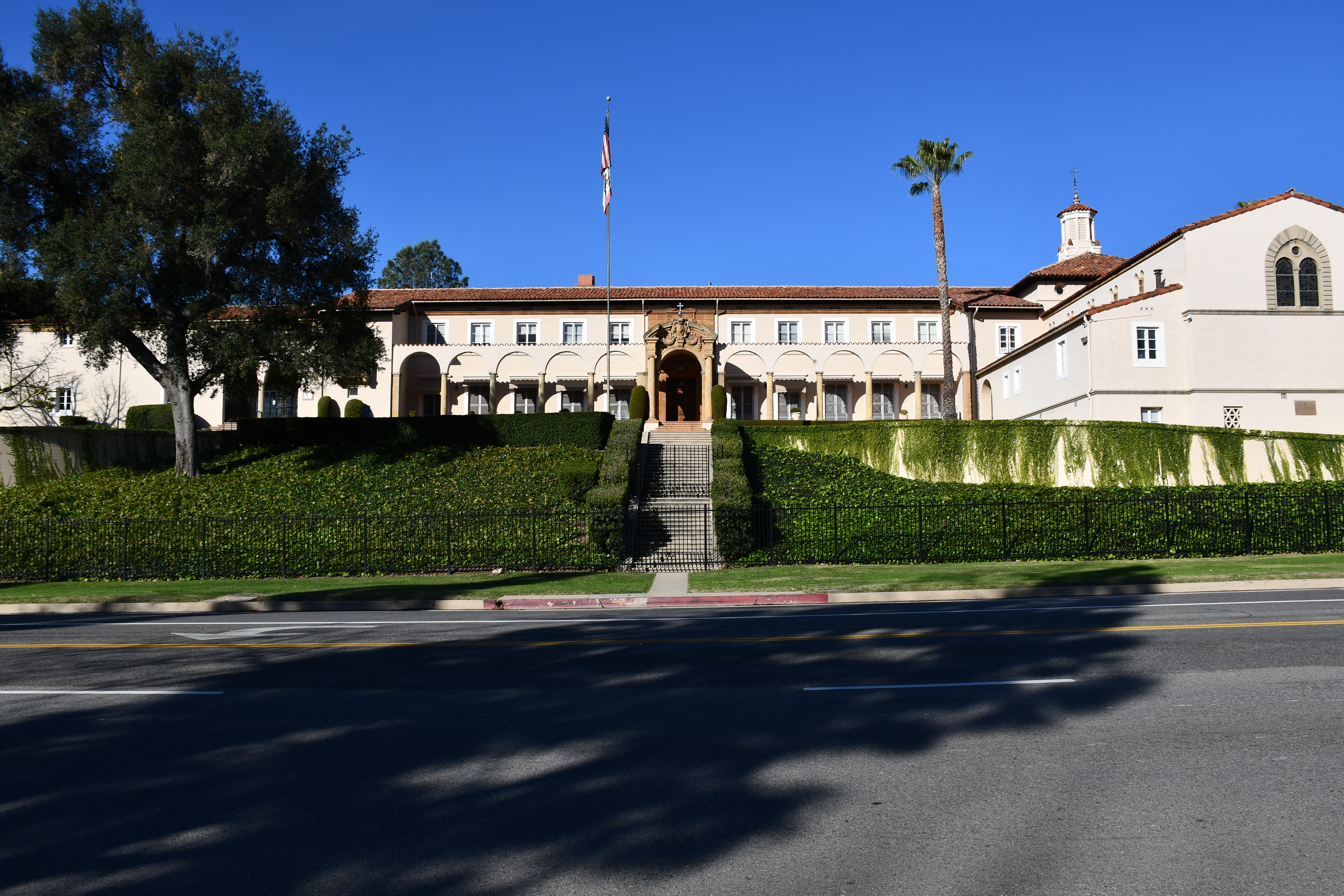

Location
- 10643 W Sunset Boulevard; Bel Air, Los Angeles; Bel Air, Los Angeles, (Los Angeles County), California 90077; United States; 34°4′31″N 118°26′43″W

Information
- Type: Private; College-preparatory; Catholic school
- Motto: That all may have life, and have it to the full
- Religious affiliation: Roman Catholic
- Established: 1923
- Founder: Mother Marie Joseph Butler RSHM
- Head of school: Jacqueline L. Landry
- Faculty: 50
- Grades: 9-12
- Gender: Girls
- Average class size: 14
- Student to teacher ratio: 8:1
- Colors: Navy and white
- Slogan: Confident Girls. Ethical Leaders. Global Advocates.
- Athletics conference: CIF Southern Section; Mission League
- Nickname: Sailors
- Accreditation: Western Association of Schools and Colleges
- Publication: Sunset Magazine (literary and art magazine)
- Newspaper: The Anchor
- School fees: New student: $1,000 books: $300–$700 uniforms: $300–$600 technology: $550 labs, AP testing, tuition insurance: $45–$450
- Tuition: $45,750–$46,750
- Affiliation: Religious of the Sacred Heart of Mary
- Website: www.mhs-la.org

Los Angeles Historic-Cultural Monument
- Designated: September 28, 1982
- Reference no.: 254

Marymount High School is an independent, Catholic, all-girls, college-preparatory high school located in the Bel Air neighborhood of Los Angeles, California. It sits on Sunset Boulevard across from the University of California, Los Angeles, campus at 10643 Sunset Boulevard. The school's main administration building, chapel and auditorium are listed as Los Angeles Historic-Cultural Monuments.

== History ==
Marymount was established in 1923 by the Religious of the Sacred Heart of Mary. Mother Marie Joseph Butler of the Religious of the Sacred Heart of Mary founded the school. Marymount students and teams are known as the "Sailors".

Marymount High School is one of nineteen members of the Global Network of RSHM Schools worldwide. Marymount's classes have a 8:1 Student-Teacher ratio with the average class size of 14.

== Notable alumni ==
- Tatyana Ali, class of 1997, actress
- Giada De Laurentiis, class of 1989, chef on the Food Network
- Mia Farrow, class of 1963
- Olivia Jade Giannulli, class of 2018, YouTuber, one of the subjects of the 2019 college admissions scandal.
- Mariska Hargitay, class of 1982, actress
- Khloe Kardashian, class of 2003, television and internet personality
- Kim Kardashian, class of 1998, television personality
- Kourtney Kardashian, class of 1997, television personality
- Marlo Thomas, class of 1955, actress, producer, author, and social activist
- Cammie King, class of 1952, child actress and public relations officer
- Bianca Lawson, class of 1997, actress
- Nika Soon-Shiong, class of 2011, activist
- Pat Hitchcock, class of 1947, actress
- Maria Blasucci, class of 2004, actress and comedy writer
- Raquel Alessi, actress
- Charlotte Lawrence, singer, actress, and model
