= Barrallier Books =

Barrallier Books Pty Ltd is a small publishing business based in Victoria, Australia.

It was started by Ian Gordon in 1999. Its first success was a deluxe book of original sonnets and reflective essays, Sonnets to a Promiscuous Beauty, published in 2005 and written by Melbourne-based author and academic Paul Monk. That was followed in 2006 by Hills of the West Wind by Tasmanian author Chris Binks and then The West in a Nutshell, also by Paul Monk, published in 2009.

When Ian Gordon retired from the Australian Army in 2009, deluxe productions and book designs by Peter Gamble were emphasised. In 2010 Barrallier Books published Vietnam on Canvas, a biography of Australia's official Vietnam War artist, Ken McFadyen, by Melbourne-based author and artist Sandra Finger Lee.

In 2011 Barrallier Books released Guitar, the Australian Journey by Canberra based journalist and musician Chris Johnson.

Other works published include Waiting 'round the Bend... White Sherpas William Holmes
