= Michele B. Chan =

American philanthropist and actress

- Born: East London, Cape Province, South Africa
- Occupations: Actress; Philanthropist
- Known for: role of Mei Jan in MacGyver
- Spouse: Patrick Soon-Shiong
- Children: 2, including Nika

Michele B. Chan is an American philanthropist and former actress. She was born in East London, South Africa. Chan is the CEO of NantStudio, which she founded in 2015.

== Acting career ==
Chan was best known for her role in the series MacGyver as Mei Jan, who impersonated MacGyver's deceased foster daughter Sue Ling. She appeared in the movie American Ninja 3: Blood Hunt and also had recurring roles in the American television series Hotel and the Canadian TV show Danger Bay.

== Personal life ==
Chan married South African-born American surgeon Patrick Soon-Shiong in 1977. Her husband later developed business interests and became a billionaire, as well as minority owner of the Los Angeles Lakers. They have two children, including Nika Soon-Shiong, an activist. In 2018, they became co-owners of the Los Angeles Times.
