= Not happy, Jan! =

Line delivered by actress Deborah Kennedy in an Australian television advertisement

Deborah Kennedy's character delivers the now-famous line.

"Not happy, Jan!" is a line delivered by actress Deborah Kennedy in an Australian television advertisement from the year 2000. Due to the ad's popularity in Australia, the line entered the cultural vernacular as a catchphrase used to express a feeling of discontent.

== Background ==
The television commercial from which the phrase originated was created by advertising agency Clemenger BBDO Melbourne for Sensis (the directories arm of Telstra), to promote the upcoming deadline for advertising in Australia's Yellow Pages. In the commercial, a businesswoman (Kennedy) has just discovered that one of her staff (Jan, played by Rhonda Doyle) has neglected to book an ad in the upcoming year's Yellow Pages. Realising they will have to wait another year, she calmly goes through some anger management techniques. When Jan runs away from work, Kennedy's unnamed character talks to herself and counts to ten before opening the window and shouting "Not... happy... Jan!" towards the fleeing figure of Jan. The phrase was ad-libbed by Kennedy on the day of shooting. The ad ended up becoming lucrative for Australia's Yellow Pages, with the words "Closing Soon. Call 132378" appearing on television from 2000 to 2003.

Since the advertisement, "Not happy, Jan" has entered the Australian vernacular to express displeasure, particularly at a problem caused by another's negligence or incompetence. In the time immediately following the advertisement, it was usually said in a manner which mimicked the advertisement, but today is usually spoken with a casual, slightly stern tone. Understandably, women named Jan were particularly targeted.

The phrase was co-opted by the unsuccessful 'Not happy, John!' campaign, opposing the re-election of Australian Prime Minister John Howard in the 2004 federal election. The title of the campaign also became the title of a book detailing the negative aspects of the Howard Government. Both "Not happy, Jan", and "Not happy, John", are common noms de plume used in short letters to newspaper editors.

The commercial was featured on a 2005 episode of the Australian TV series 20 to One as one of the best Australian commercials of all time. The catchphrase "Not happy, Jan!" was also rated as best catchphrase in Australia on the similar TV series The Spearman Experiment in 2009.

The characters were relaunched in 2019, including a role reprisal with Deborah Kennedy, with the ad duplicated almost shot-for-shot as promotion for the re-launch of Darrell Lea chocolates, putting a twist on the end of the ad by having Darrell Lea chocolates calming Kennedy's character into forgiveness and having her character shout "No worries, Jan!". Sensis sent cease-and-desist requests to Darrell Lea confectionery company, their advertising agency Akkomplice, and the television stations broadcasting the updated commercial, which was acknowledged by Darrell Lea, who withdrew the ad and sardonically offered Yellow Pages chocolates to calm them down.
