= Nasser Mashni =

Australian activist

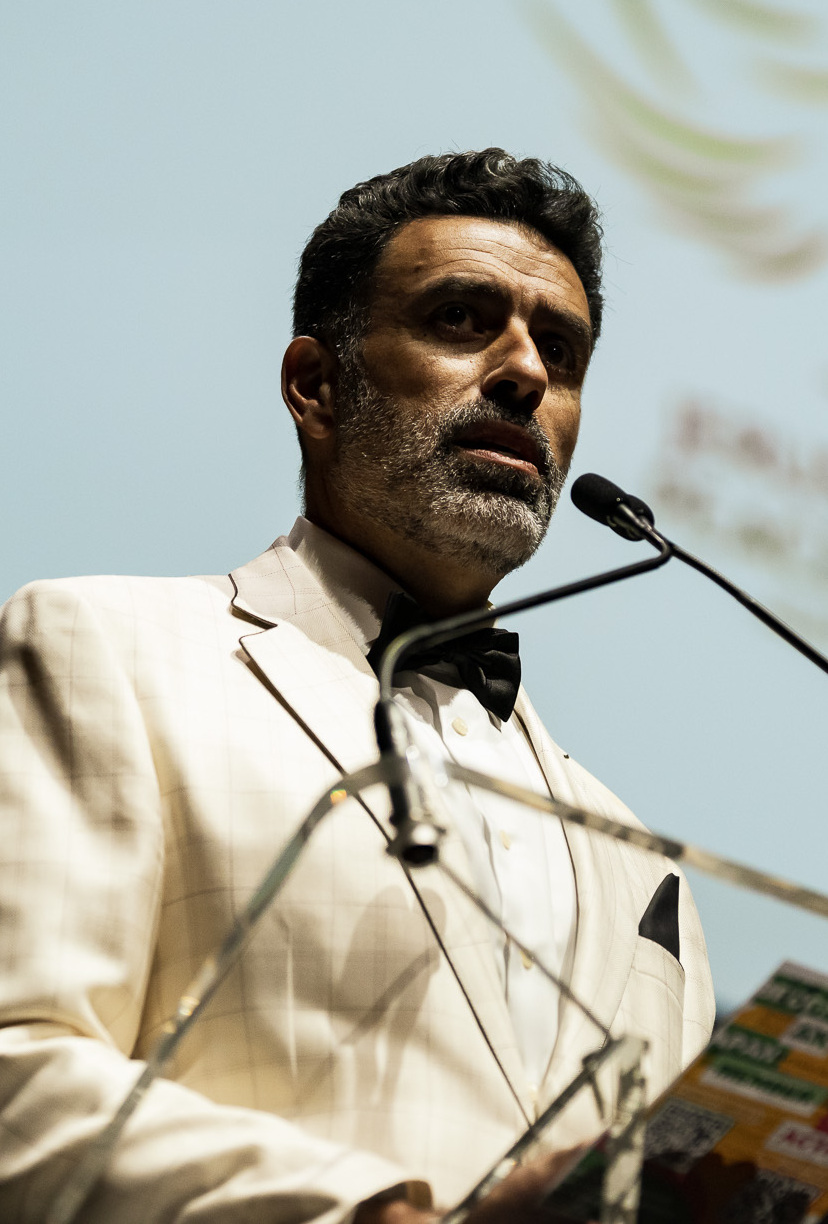
- Mashni in 2025
- Known for: President of the Australia Palestine Advocacy Network

Nasser Mashni is a Palestinian-Australian property developer, best known for his political activism as the president of the Australia Palestine Advocacy Network (APAN). Mashni has helped organise numerous pro-Palestinian protests with large followings. APAN has awarded an award called the Jerusalem (Al Quds) Peace Prize each year since 2018.

== Early life ==
Nasser Mashni was born in Australia, the son of a Palestinian refugee. His father, Shaher Hussein El-Mashni (1926–2007), was a Palestinian activist who was frequently absent from home due to his political work. El-Mashni had been a member of the Palestinian resistance led by Palestinian leader Abdel-Kader al-Husseini, and moved to Jordan after Al-Husseini's death in 1948. He migrated to Australia in 1959, and formed the Australian wing of the Fatah movement. He was active in Yasser Arafat's Palestinian "parliament-in-exile", the Palestinian National Council. He died in Melbourne in March 2007.

Mashni has two brothers.

== Activism ==
=== APAN ===
Mashni is president of the Australia Palestine Advocacy Network (APAN), an organisation that "advocates and takes action for Palestine until liberation and self-determination are realised". He has worked for the organisation since around 2017.

APAN was established in 2011. Its stated aims are to "provide a national voice for the many thousands of people concerned about Israel's continuing genocide, occupation and apartheid against Palestinians". The board and staff of the organisation includes non-Palestinians, including Jewish cultural historian and University of Melbourne academic Jordana Silverstein. Its patrons were retired Major General Ian Gordon and unionist Wendy Turner, with Bishop George Browning as president in the early 2020s. Mashni became president in January 2023. Past members of the executive board include Labor politician Claire Moore (who was also vice president for some time), child psychiatrist and academic Jon Jureidini, and writer Claudia Hyles.

The organisation condemned the 2025 Bondi Beach attack and said "perpetrators of this horrendous attack do not represent our movement or the values we uphold".

==== Jerusalem (Al Quds) Peace Prize ====
APAN awards the Jerusalem (Al Quds) Peace Prize, to recognise individuals who have been significant advocates of "Palestinian freedom, justice and self-determination". The inaugural recipient in 2018 was Stuart Rees, and since then, recipients have included Anthony Loewenstein, Gary Foley, Melissa Parke, Helen McCue, Wendy Turner and Randa Abdel-Fattah.

=== Views ===
Mashni has been critical of what he calls "the Zionist lobby", and has said that he considered the October 7 attacks by Hamas on Israel as "a fight against oppression". He considers Israel to be a settler colonial state. Mashni has emphasised that he believes in quality and humanity for all people in the region of Israel and Palestine, not just the Jewish people, and stating he opposes supremacy. He considers the liberation of Palestine a domino in the movement for a liberated Earth.

Mashni has emphasised that his issue is with Zionism and not Judaism.

=== Protests and advocacy ===
Mashni was a co-founder of Australians for Palestine. In his role as president of APAN, Mashni has helped organise numerous pro-Palestinian rallies that have garnered between 50,000 and 100,000 protester participants. In 2022, Mashni filed a racial discrimination complaint with the Australian Human Rights Commission concerning the federal government's stance on Israel.

Mashni has been critical of Donald Trump's plan for a ceasefire in Gaza, and critical of the fact that Israel is allowed keep its weapons, while Palestinians are being told to disarm. Mashni and APAN have also been lobbying the Australian Government to stop supplying arms to Israel, and impose country-level sanctions. Mashni and APAN believe this would prevent the killing of Palestinians and absolve Australia from being complicit in their deaths. He does not believe in a two-state solution, comparing the two-state solution to South African apartheid. He believes that the recognition of an independent Palestinian state alongside Israel would be equivalent to partitioning South Africa as a way to end apartheid in the 1990s.

Mashni and APAN have been influential in the Australian pro-Palestinian advocacy space, where they have sponsored and hosted weekly and later monthly rallies and protests since October 2023 across Australia. Mashni has said the drop in frequency of events is due to how much time and energy it takes to put the events together, but also emphasised that their exhaustion is nothing compared to what ordinary Palestinians in Gaza endure on a daily basis. Following one of these rallies, charges were brought against Mashni under the Racial and Religious Tolerance Act 2001 by Jewish community activist Menachem Vorchheimer based on the fact that rally participants were allowed to chant "all Zionists are terrorists".

In June 2024, a pro-Palestinian rally marking the 35th consecutive week of demonstrations against the war in Gaza in Melbourne led to clashes between protesters and police. Victoria Police stated that officers were met with hostile behavior from a crowd of around 200 people, including having bottles and signs thrown at them and an officer being spat on. Mashni stated that police escalated tensions by using pepper spray without justification, though he was unaware of objects being thrown at officers and condemned all violence regardless of its source.

On 6 October 2024 another protest hosted by APAN resulted in arrests of some of the protesters. Mashni had warned of "agitators" who were trying to harm the movement, and advised attendees at the rally to abide by the law. In December 2024 Mashni spoke at a pro-Palestinian event alongside MP Lidia Thorpe, and condemned the recent firebombing of a Melbourne synagogue calling the perpetrators of the fire racist and fascist.

In May 2025, the Australian Broadcasting Corporation (ABC) removed an interview with Mashni, which had been briefly available on the broadcaster's website and its streaming service, iview. The interview, conducted by Kathryn Robinson, followed comments by Prime Minister Anthony Albanese criticising Israel's blockade of humanitarian aid to Gaza as "completely untenable and without credibility". In the interview, Mashni expressed support for Albanese's stance and described Israel as a "rogue, apartheid, genocidal state". He also called for sanctions, an end to two-way military trade, and the cancellation of contracts with Israeli weapons manufacturer Elbit Systems. The removal of the interview was publicly noted by independent Senator Lidia Thorpe, who described it as the suppression of a "crucial Palestinian voice". The ABC stated that the clip had been "mistakenly uploaded" and removed after the error was identified. Mashni said he had not been contacted regarding complaints or editorial decisions and expressed concern that the removal represented the silencing of Palestinian perspectives. The incident attracted attention amid ongoing international scrutiny of Israel's military actions in Gaza.

Mashni does not consider all of Hamas to be a terrorist organisation and has advocated to un-designate certain parts of the organisation as such. Mashni has also advocated to change Australian racism laws. Mashni has also been critical of Prime Minister Anthony Albanese and the Australian Government's antisemitism envoy Jillian Segal. Stating that there should be a royal commission into hate, not just the elevation of one community.

During the Adelaide Writers' Week boycott, following the cancellation of Randa Abdel-Fattah's scheduled appearance by the Adelaide Festival board, Mashni described the decision as "anti-Palestinian racism" and said that linking her to 2025 Bondi Beach shooting, in which she had no part, was "deeply irresponsible and discriminatory". He called for structural changes to ensure similar actions do not happen again.

== Other activities ==
Mashni founded the charity Olive Kids, that sends aid to Palestinian children in Gaza. Australian Jewish News and The Australian have alleged that Olive Kids may be linked to the Popular Front for the Liberation of Palestine; However, there is no independent corroboration of this.

Mashni has appeared as a guest on a number of local, commercial, and international TV and radio networks, and has also written articles for news outlets. He co-produces and co-hosts a weekly radio show and podcast called Palestine Remembered, broadcast on Australian Community Radio Network stations.
