= Garfield Medical Center =

- AHMC & Healthcare, Inc.

Geography
- Location: 525 N Garfield Ave: Monterey Park, CA 91754, Monterey Park, California, United States
- Coordinates: 34.0680°N 118.1237°W

Organization
- Affiliated university: Western University of Health Sciences

Services
- Beds: 210

History
- Founded: 1927

Links
- Website: www.garfieldmedicalcenter.com
- Lists: Hospitals in California

Garfield Medical Center is a 210-bed general medical and surgical hospital in Monterey Park, California. In the most recent year with available data, the hospital had 11,586 admissions, 21,621 emergency department visits, 1,949 annual inpatient surgeries and 2,602 outpatient surgeries. Garfield Medical Center is accredited by the Joint Commission (JC). The hospital first opened in 1921.

Garfield Medical Center has annual revenues of about $1.2 billion, and with 970 employees, the hospital is the second largest employer in Monterey Park.
