= Margo Kingston =

Australian journalist

Margo Kingston (born 1959) is an Australian journalist, author, and commentator. She is best known for her work at The Sydney Morning Herald and her weblog, Webdiary. Since 2012, Kingston has been a citizen journalist, reporting and commenting on Australian politics via Twitter and her own Web site.

== Early life and education ==
Kingston was born in Maryborough, Queensland and was raised in Mackay. She attended the University of Queensland, graduating with a degree in arts and law.

Her sister Gay Alcorn is a journalist and newspaper editor.

== Career ==
Kingston qualified as a solicitor and practised in Brisbane and later lectured in commercial law in Rockhampton, before becoming a journalist for The Courier-Mail. Within a year she moved to The Times on Sunday. She also worked for The Age, The Canberra Times and A Current Affair before moving to The Sydney Morning Herald, where she worked until August 2005.

Kingston gained prominence in 1998 when she led a sit-in of journalists at the federal election campaign launch of the One Nation Party in the Queensland town of Gatton. The group was protesting the party's treatment of the media during the campaign. Her experiences during this time are recorded in her book, Off The Rails: The Pauline Hanson Trip, which won the 2000 Dobbie award for best first book by a female writer.

In 2004, Margo wrote Not Happy, John, launched in Sydney by Tony Fitzgerald QC, which would go on to inspire the campaign of the same name to remove John Howard from his seat of Bennelong at the 2004 federal election.

Kingston may be seen as part of the "larrikin/ratbag" Australian journalistic tradition which also encompasses Alan Ramsey and Stephen Mayne. This tradition is characterised by a willingness to break with convention, espouse controversial opinions and intervene in the events which the journalist is reporting. Kingston has been perceived by many, including her supporters, as openly left wing in her political views, however she describes her own position this way: "the irony [is] that I'm not left wing, I'm a small-l liberal. A dying breed."

== Webdiary ==
Margo Kingston also wrote Webdiary, which until 22 August 2005 was on the Sydney Morning Herald website. On this site Kingston recorded opinions on current events alongside contributors from the general public. Kingston terminated her contract with John Fairfax Holdings, publishers of The Sydney Morning Herald in August 2005. A new site was set up bearing the motto, "Independent, Ethical, Accountable and Transparent".

Webdiary content is collected to form part of the Pandora Archive, Australia's Web Archive established initially by the National Library of Australia and now built in collaboration with nine other Australian libraries and cultural collecting organisations. The Pandora Archive collects and provides long-term access to selected online publications and web sites that are about Australia, are by an Australian author on a subject of social, political, cultural, religious, scientific or economic significance and relevance to Australia, or are by an Australian author of recognised authority and make a contribution to international knowledge.

Webdiary's Charter states, in part, that its mission is "to help meet the unmet demand of some Australians for conversations on our present and our future, and to spark original thought and genuine engagement with important issues which effect us all, to link thinking Australians whoever they are and wherever they live and to insist that thinking Australians outside the political and economic establishment have the capacity to contribute to the national debate".

Margo Kingston set an ethical standard for Webdiary based on the Code of Ethics of the Media, Entertainment and Arts Alliance, and also an Editorial Policy. The Editorial Policy states inter alia: "If you think you've been unfairly edited, or that we've wrongly refused to publish your comments, please feel free to query our decision by posting a comment. This sometimes happens, and leads to an online discussion of the meaning and interpretation of the guidelines."

Margo Kingston announced on 7 December 2005 that she would be leaving the site (and journalism) due to financial constraints. The site continued in existence without her input and is managed by Webdiary Pty Ltd, a private company established by volunteers who had helped Margo Kingston to establish and maintain the independent new site. Directors of Webdiary Pty Ltd and a group of volunteers kept the site alive after Margo Kingston had walked away from it. Margo Kingston related her view of the Webdiary story in a lecture to the South Australian Governor's Leadership Forum in February 2006. In June 2007, one of the four directors of Webdiary Pty Ltd resigned and the one volunteer still actively involved in comment moderation also quit for a time. Margo Kingston returned to Webdiary at that point in order to keep it alive.

Many opinions featured in Webdiary made their way into Margo Kingston's 2004 book Not Happy, John, which inspired the 'Not happy, John!' campaign, of which she was a founding member. Kingston was also a regular guest on Late Night Live, a nightly radio programme on the Australian Broadcasting Corporation's Radio National network.

On 3 August 2007, the publishing director of Penguin Australia, Bob Sessions, asked Margo Kingston to update Not Happy, John. The update, titled Still Not Happy, John! was published by Penguin on 1 October 2007, and it was launched at an event held at Manning Clark House on 8 October 2007.

== No Fibs ==
After community supported Webdiary closed in July 2012, Margo Kingston came out of retirement to co-publish No Fibs, a crowd funded Citizen journalism news source focusing on Australian politics, with former Webdiary colleague, Tony Yegles. Kingston credited Twitter with her re-emergence as a journalist, and No Fibs began to distribute its articles via its own website and Twitter. In early 2013 an ebook of Still Not Happy, John! was published by Penguin.

In May 2013 No Fibs launched a citizen journalism project in partnership with Macquarie University to report the 2013 Australian federal election. A national call for voluntary citizen journalists was distributed on Twitter resulting in reports from all states and territories except the Northern Territory.

No Fibs published reports by a cluster of citizen journalists resident in the Victorian Division of Indi where, after a lengthy preference count, Independent candidate Cathy McGowan was elected over long-term Liberal incumbent, Sophie Mirabella. During the election campaign, Kingston created a Twitter hashtag, #IndiVotes, to distribute No Fibs' reports and focus widespread social and mainstream media interest on the election outcome in Indi.
