= Protein-bound paclitaxel =

Cancer drug

Combination of
- Paclitaxel: Mitotic inhibitor
- Albumin: Delivery vehicle

Clinical data
- Trade names: Abraxane, others
- AHFS/Drugs.com: Monograph
- MedlinePlus: a619008
- License data: US DailyMed: Paclitaxel
- Pregnancy category: AU: D
- Routes of administration: Intravenous
- ATC code: L01CD01 (WHO)

Legal status
- Legal status: AU: S4 (Prescription only); CA: ℞-only; UK: POM (Prescription only); US: ℞-only; EU: Rx-only; In general: ℞ (Prescription only)

Identifiers
- CAS Number: 33069-62-4
- DrugBank: DB01229
- ChemSpider: none
- UNII: P88XT4IS4D
- KEGG: D00491

Protein-bound paclitaxel, also known as nanoparticle albumin–bound paclitaxel or nab-paclitaxel, is an injectable formulation of paclitaxel used to treat breast cancer, lung cancer and pancreatic cancer, among others. Paclitaxel kills cancer cells by preventing the normal breakdown of microtubules during cell division. In this formulation, paclitaxel is bonded to albumin as a delivery vehicle. It is manufactured and sold in the United States by Celgene under the trade name Abraxane where it is designated as an orphan drug as first-line treatment, in combination with gemcitabine, for the orphan disease "metastatic adenocarcinoma of the pancreas".

This treatment was approved in the United States in 2005, and the European Union in 2008, for breast cancer cases where cancer did not respond to other chemotherapy or has relapsed. In 2012, the FDA widened the approved uses to include treatment for NSCLC. In 2013, the FDA approved protein-bound paclitaxel for use in treating advanced pancreatic cancer as a less toxic (although less effective) alternative to FOLFIRINOX.

== Society and culture ==
Abraxane is registered on the Australian Register of Therapeutic Goods for the treatment of metastatic carcinoma of the breast after failure of anthracycline therapy. Abraxane is also included on the Schedule of the Australian Pharmaceutical Benefits Scheme although the manufacturer was unable to convince the independent Pharmaceutical Benefits Advisory Committee that the drug warranted a higher price than existing comparator drugs. Protein-bound paclitaxel was developed by VivoRx which became Abraxis BioScience as the first in its class of drugs to use the nanoparticle albumin bound (nab) technology platform.

In 2010, Abraxis was acquired by Celgene, which now markets Abraxane. Total revenue from the sales of Abraxane for 2009 were $314.5 million. In 2013, Abraxane was FDA approved for the treatment of pancreatic cancer. In 2014, Abraxane's sales were $848 million, 31 percent year-over-year increase. In 2019 Bristol Meyers Squibb acquired Celgene for $74 billion dollars, and thus acquired Abraxis Bioscience and the rights to manufacture and market Abraxane.

The UK's National Institute for Health and Care Excellence (NICE) announced in 2015, that it would not support the routine use of protein-bound paclitaxel in advanced pancreatic cancer on the NHS. However, this decision was changed in September 2017. It has continued to be reimbursed in England since then, despite questionable real world effectiveness.
