= Nika Soon-Shiong =

American politician and activist

- Soon-Shiong in 2025

Public Safety Commissioner of West Hollywood
- In office September 13, 2021 – October 11, 2022

Personal details
- Born: February 26, 1993 (age 33)
- Parent(s): Patrick Soon-Shiong (father); Michele B. Chan (mother)
- Education: Stanford University (BA, MA); University of Oxford (DPhil)

Nika Soon-Shiong (born February 26, 1993) is an American politician and activist who served as a Public Safety Commissioner of West Hollywood from 2021 to 2022. She is the founder and executive director of the Fund for Guaranteed Income and was also part of the Compton Pledge and Long Beach Pledge guaranteed income programs. She was on the board of the Committee to Protect Journalists (CPJ) from June 2021 to June 2026. Soon-Shiong is the publisher of Drop Site News.

== Early life and career ==
Soon-Shiong was born on February 26, 1993, to Patrick Soon-Shiong and Michele B. Chan; she has a brother. She graduated from Marymount High School in 2011, where she participated in Model United Nations.

In 2015, Soon-Shiong graduated Phi Beta Kappa from Stanford University with a B.A. in international relations and a minor in creative writing. In 2016, she graduated with an M.A. in African studies from Stanford. She led a "photovoice" project on youth unemployment in Nyanga, Cape Town, and Gaborone. She also interned for TeachAids, and interned for two summers for the Los Angeles Times a few years before her father purchased the newspaper.

In 2019, Soon-Shiong became a doctoral candidate at the University of Oxford. In 2024, she graduated from Oxford with a D.Phil. in economics and industrial development.

== Career ==
After graduation, Soon-Shiong worked for a few years at Equal Education, an activist movement in South Africa, before moving to work in the office of the President of the World Bank Group, focusing on technology and development (especially Benin), where she continues to be a consultant.

In August 2020, Soon-Shiong founded the nonprofit organization Fund for Guaranteed Income (F4GI) and became the co-director of the Compton Pledge, an F4GI initiative to trial a guaranteed income program in Compton, California. The organization later expanded to Long Beach, California, forming the Long Beach Pledge, and now runs seven such initiatives.

=== In media ===
Soon-Shiong has been involved in news media, especially the Los Angeles Times (her father purchased the paper in 2018, and she interned for the paper for two summers a few years before his purchase), since June 2020, when she criticized the Los Angeles Times for its crime coverage, notably its use of the term "looting" in its headlines during the George Floyd protests. The next month, when there were fears of layoffs, Soon-Shiong urged her father to meet with Black and Latino employees; no layoffs occurred. In February 2021, when the Wall Street Journal speculated that Patrick Soon-Shiong was looking to sell the Los Angeles Times, Soon-Shiong responded that they were "100% wrong". On June 25, 2021, it was announced that Soon-Shiong had joined the Committee to Protect Journalists's (CPJ) board of directors. She also serves as the director of One Fair Wage and on the board of Compton Development Corporation.

In September 2025, Soon-Shiong became the publisher of Drop Site News.

In June 2026, the CPJ began a formal review of its definition of who qualifies as a journalist. As a result, the CPJ removed the names of 20 Palestinian journalists from its count of journalists killed during the Gaza War. Soon-Shiong wrote to the CPJ board: "Reopening the question of 'who is a journalist' carries profound implications for the individuals CPJ protects and for the organizations with which they are affiliated. It's a betrayal to our colleagues in Gaza who have faced the deadliest conflict for journalists ever recorded". Soon after, she was told she was no longer a member of the CPJ board.

=== In politics ===
On September 13, 2021, West Hollywood council member Lindsey Horvath appointed Soon-Shiong to the Public Safety Commission. As a commissioner representing citizen concerns, she questioned policing in the city. Soon-Shiong was met with backlash for this, with Horvath calling the backlash "rooted in racism". In June 2022, the West Hollywood City Council voted to reduce the number of sheriffs in the city and replace them with unarmed security guards, a move Soon-Shiong called "pragmatic and fiscally responsible" but said "could have gone further."

In July 2022, Soon-Shiong announced that she would step down as a Public Safety Commissioner in August 2022 to continue her studies at the University of Oxford, where she had been remotely enrolled during the COVID-19 pandemic.

In October 2024, Soon-Shiong said the Los Angeles Times's refusal to endorse Kamala Harris in the 2024 United States presidential election was motivated by Harris's continued support for Israel during the ongoing war in Gaza. Her father later disputed that statement.

== Publications ==
- Sidimba, Luzuko; Soon-Shiong, Nika (June 7, 2017). "Withholding keys to education, literally!". DispatchLIVE (Opinion article). East London, South Africa: Arena Holdings.
- Sidimba, Luzuko; Soon-Shiong, Nika (November 3, 2017). "Equalisers fight for schools not built". Mail & Guardian (Opinion article). Johannesburg: Newtrust Company Botswana Limited.
- Soon-Shiong, Nika (October 31, 2018). Implementing agents: The middlemen in charge of school infrastructure (PDF) (Report). Khayelitsha, South Africa: Equal Education.
- Soon-Shiong, Nika; Qhotsokoane, Tebello; Phillips, Toby (May 12, 2020). Using digital technologies to re-imagine cash transfers during the Covid-19 crisis (PDF) (Report). Digital Pathways Paper Series. Vol. 2. Oxford, UK: Blavatnik School of Government.
- Soon-Shiong, Nika (June 2020). "Public procurement and implementing agents: The middlemen in charge of school infrastructure delivery in the Eastern Cape of South Africa". In Quinot, Geo; Williams-Elegbe, Sope (eds.). Public procurement regulation in Africa: Development in uncertain times. Durban, South Africa: LexisNexis South Africa. pp. 229–248. ISBN 978-0-6390-1060-1. OCLC 1201544773.
- Soon-Shiong, Nika (April 28, 2022). "Contract cities in LA County are overpaying for LASD services". Knock LA (Opinion article). Los Angeles: Ground Game LA.
- Soon-Shiong, Nika (May 14, 2022). "LASD-run inmate welfare fund: Another black hole of taxpayer dollars". Knock LA (Opinion article). Los Angeles: Ground Game LA.
- Soon-Shiong, Nika (August 26, 2024). "Police can't house Californians. Cash can". The Appeal (Opinion article).
- Howard, Neil; Langridge, Nick; Mathur, Vibhor; Hamilton, Leah; Westlake, David; Soon-Shiong, Nika; Laker-Oketta, Miriam; Davala, Sarath; Tinaut, Aida Martinez; Laín, Bru; Franchi, Maria; Morrow, Virginia (October 2024). Doing radical things right: Ethical good practice for basic income experiments (PDF) (Report). Centre for Development Studies Report Series. Bath, Somerset, England: University of Bath. ISSN 2977-392X.
