= Joking Apart (play) =

- Written by: Alan Ayckbourn
- Characters: Richard; Anthea; Hugh; Louise; Sven; Olive; Brian; Melody; Mandy; Mo; Debbie
- Original language: English

Premiere
- Date premiered: 11 January 1978
- Place premiered: Stephen Joseph Theatre

Joking Apart is a 1978 play by English playwright Alan Ayckbourn. It premiered on 11 January 1978 at the Stephen Joseph Theatre in Scarborough, North Yorkshire.

== Premise ==
Charming and naturally successful in everything they do, happily married middle-class couple Anthea and Richard almost unconsciously but ruthlessly dominate the lives of everyone whose company they keep, as seen at four gatherings at their home that take place at various points over a 12-year period: Richard's business partner Sven is ousted from their firm and experiences problems with his wife Olive, Brian goes through a series of girlfriends (Melody, Mandy, and Mo) in an attempt to move on from his feelings for Anthea, local vicar Hugh falls hopelessly for Anthea, and Hugh's wife Louise is driven to drugs by Anthea and Richard's perfect life and unrelenting kindness. The play ends with Anthea and Richard's daughter Debbie awaiting the guests for her 18th birthday party, where Brian sees her as his next and final substitute for Anthea.

== Production ==
Written in response to criticism that Ayckbourn only ever wrote about unhappy couples, the play follows a happy couple who inadvertently worsen the lives of their friends. In most productions, Brian's girlfriends are portrayed by the same actress, with other characters commenting on their similar physical appearances.
