= The Times Will Suit Them =

- Author: Geoff Boucher; Matthew Sharpe
- Publisher: Allen & Unwin
- Publication date: October 2008
- Media type: Paperback
- Pages: 272
- ISBN: 9781741756241
- Dewey Decimal: 320.994 22
- LC Class: JC573.2.A8 B68 2008

The Times Will Suit Them: Postmodern Conservatism in Australia is a 2008 book by the academics Geoff Boucher and Matthew Sharpe. The book argues that for more than a decade Prime Minister John Howard took advantage of international crises and local anxieties to stay in government and significantly reshape Australian public life. The authors outline a theory that despite its conservative background the Howard government was postmodernist, skeptical of organised politics and committed to policies based on a relative assessment of Australian cultural values rather than more universal international ideals. These characteristics, casting the government in a "radical conservative" mould, are presented as an explanation for the government's electoral success.

== See also ==
- List of books about John Howard
