= Patrick Soon-Shiong =

South African and American doctor (born 1952)

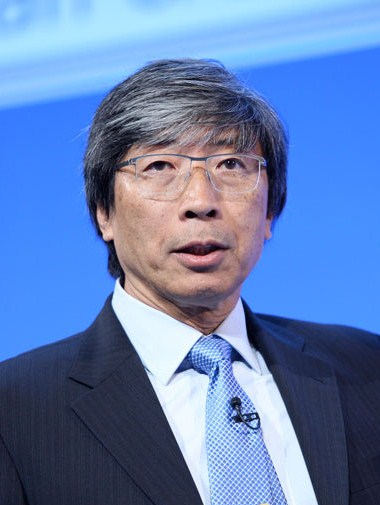
- Soon-Shiong in 2014
- Born: July 29, 1952 (age 74); Port Elizabeth, Union of South Africa
- Citizenship: South Africa; United States
- Education: University of the Witwatersrand (MBBCh, MD); University of British Columbia (MSc)
- Occupations: Businessman; investor; medical researcher; transplant surgeon
- Known for: Inventor of Abraxane; Developer of transplant techniques for pancreatic islets
- Title: Founder & CEO Nantworks LLC; Owner of Los Angeles Times; Minority owner of Los Angeles Lakers
- Spouse: Michele B. Chan
- Children: 2, including Nika

Chinese name
- Traditional Chinese: 黃馨祥
- Simplified Chinese: 黄馨祥
Transcriptions
Standard Mandarin
- Hanyu Pinyin: Huáng Xīnxiáng
Yue: Cantonese
- Jyutping: Wong4 Hing1 Coeng4

Patrick Soon-Shiong (Chinese: 黄馨祥; pinyin: Huáng Xīnxiáng; born July 29, 1952) is a South African and American businessman, researcher and surgeon who invented Abraxane, a drug used for lung, breast, and pancreatic cancer. He has been the owner and executive chairman of the Los Angeles Times since 2018.

Soon-Shiong received FDA approval for a new class of immunotherapy drug called Anktiva in non-muscle invasive bladder cancer in 2024. Soon-Shiong is the founder of NantWorks, a network of healthcare, biotech, and artificial intelligence startups; an adjunct professor of surgery and executive director of the Wireless Health Institute at the University of California, Los Angeles; and a visiting professor at Imperial College London and Dartmouth College. He is currently Executive Chairman, Global Chief Medical & Technology Officer at ImmunityBio.

Soon-Shiong is the chairman of Chan Soon-Shiong Family Foundation, a non-profit foundation. He has been a minority owner of the Los Angeles Lakers since 2010. Soon-Shiong's net worth is estimated at US$16.6 billion as of 2026 according to the Bloomberg Billionaires Index and Forbes. He has been called the richest man in Los Angeles and one of the wealthiest doctors in the world.

== Early life and education ==
Soon-Shiong was born in Port Elizabeth (then part of the Union of South Africa) to Chinese immigrant parents who fled China during the Japanese occupation in World War II. His parents were Hakka Chinese originally from Meixian District in Guangdong province. His ancestral surname is Huang (黃).

Soon-Shiong graduated from the University of Witwatersrand, where he was fourth in his class of 189 and received a Bachelor of Medicine at age 23. He completed his medical internship at Johannesburg's General Hospital. He then studied at the University of British Columbia, where he earned a master's degree in surgery in 1979. He also earned an M.D. from University of Witwatersrand. He received research awards from the American College of Surgeons, the Royal College of Physicians and Surgeons of Canada, and the American Association of Academic Surgery.

He immigrated to the United States and began surgical training at University of California, Los Angeles (UCLA), and became a board-certified surgeon in 1984. Soon-Shiong is a Fellow of the Royal College of Surgeons (Canada) and a Fellow of the American College of Surgeons. He is a United States citizen. (Note: The earliest date of US citizenship found in sources goes back to 2007.)

== Career ==
Soon-Shiong served on the faculty of the UCLA Medical School from 1983 until 1991 as a transplant surgeon. Between 1984 and 1987, he served as an associate investigator at the Center for Ulcer Research and Education. Soon-Shiong performed the first whole-pancreas transplant done at UCLA. He developed and first performed the experimental Type 1 diabetes-treatment known as encapsulated-human-islet transplant, and the "first pig-to-man islet-cell transplant in diabetic patients." After a period in private industry, he returned to UCLA in 2009, serving as a professor of microbiology, immunology, molecular genetics, and bioengineering. Soon-Shiong was a visiting professor at Imperial College, London, in 2011.

In 2010, in partnership with Arizona State University and the University of Arizona, Soon-Shiong established the Healthcare Transformation Institute (HTI). HTI's mission is to promote a shift in health care in the United States by better integrating the three now separate domains of medical science, health delivery, and healthcare finance.

In early 2016, Soon-Shiong launched the National Immunotherapy Coalition to encourage rival pharmaceutical companies to work together to test combinations of cancer-fighting drugs. He also met with Joe Biden in 2015 to discuss approaches to fighting cancer, including conducting genomic sequencing of 100,000 patients to create a large database of potential genetic factors.

In January 2017, as announced by press secretary Sean Spicer, then President-elect Donald Trump met with Soon-Shiong at Trump's Bedminster, New Jersey, estate to discuss national medical priorities. According to Politico, Soon-Shiong was seeking a cabinet position. In May 2017, Soon-Shiong was appointed by House Speaker Paul Ryan to the Health Information Technology Advisory Committee, a committee established by the 21st Century Cures Act.

In 2017, Soon-Shiong and his wife were invited by the Smithsonian to be part of the permanent exhibit "Many Voices, One Nation" in the National Museum of American History in Washington DC.

By summer 2021, ImmunityBio had developed a T cell-inducing universal COVID-19 vaccine booster shot that had reached Phase III trials in his native South Africa, with a stated goal of completely blocking transmission and stemming an endemic tide of COVID-19 variants. In December 2021, Soon-Shiong shared pre-clinical results of giving two different vaccine platforms (heterologous) and showed beneficial T cell levels using an adenovirus and mRNA technology.

In September 2021, Soon-Shiong and President Cyril Ramaphosa of South Africa announced via a virtual press conference a new venture called NantSA with NantWorks to expand the capability of vaccine development for Sub-Saharan Africa. NantWorks has signed a collaboration agreement with the South African government's Council for Scientific and Industrial Research, the South African Medical Research Council (SAMRC) and the Centre for Epidemic Response and Innovation.

In February 2022, Soon-Shiong announced results from ImmunityBio regarding a clinical trial in non-muscle invasive bladder cancer (NMIBC) with a 24.1 median duration and 71% complete remission. The drug was approved by the FDA in April 2024 under the name nogapendekin alfa inbakicept-pmln "ANKTIVA".

Furthering cancer related studies, Soon-Shiong and colleagues identified a consistent association between absolute lymphocyte count (ALC) and overall survival across multiple solid tumor types. Their analysis of data from the QUILT clinical trial program suggested that patients with lymphopenia (ALC <1.0 ×10³/μL) had markedly worse outcomes, and that restoration of ALC following treatment correlated with prolonged survival. To test whether lymphocyte restoration could be therapeutically induced, the group investigated nogapendekin alfa inbakicept (NAI, also known as N-803 and marketed as ANKTIVA), an interleukin-15 (IL-15) superagonist designed to stimulate proliferation and activation of natural killer (NK) and CD8⁺ T cells without expanding regulatory T cells. In June 2025, the U.S. Food and Drug Administration (FDA) granted Expanded Access authorization for ANKTIVA in patients with solid tumors who had progressed after first-line therapy, allowing its use for the treatment of lymphopenia and immune reconstitution in this setting. The work proposed that lymphopenia itself represents a modifiable pathophysiologic state rather than a byproduct of disease or treatment, positioning immune restoration through IL-15 agonism as a potential therapeutic strategy across malignancies.

== Business career ==
=== Pharmaceutical, biotech, and energy ===
In 1991, Soon-Shiong left UCLA to start a diabetes and cancer biotechnology firm called VivoRx Inc. This led to the founding in 1997 of APP Pharmaceuticals, of which he held 80% of the outstanding stock, and which was ultimately sold to Fresenius SE for $4.6 billion in July 2008. Soon-Shiong purchased Fujisawa, which sold injectable generic drugs, in 1998. Soon-Shiong later founded Abraxis BioScience, with which he would develop Abraxane, which took an existing chemotherapy drug, paclitaxel, and wrapped it in protein that made it easier to deliver to tumors. He became rich after it was approved by regulators and entered the market. Abraxis was sold to Celgene in 2010 in a cash-and-stock deal valued at $2.9 billion, earning Soon-Shiong about $533 million in profits.

Soon-Shiong founded NantHealth in 2007 to provide fiber-optic, cloud-based data infrastructure to share healthcare information. Soon-Shiong went on to found NantWorks in September 2011, whose mission was "to converge ultra-low power semiconductor technology, supercomputing, high performance, secure advanced networks and augmented intelligence to transform how we work, play, and live." It owns a number of technology companies in the fields of healthcare, commerce, digital entertainment as well as a venture capital firm in the healthcare, education, science, and technology sectors. Particular technologies include machine vision, object and voice recognition, low power semiconductors, supercomputing, and networking technologies. In January 2013, he founded another biotech company, NantOmics, to develop cancer drugs based on protein kinase inhibitors. NantOmics and its sister company, NantHealth, were subsidiaries of NantWorks.

In 2013, Soon-Shiong became an early investor in Zoom, the video conferencing company.

In September 2014, NantWorks LLC, a company headed by Soon-Shiong, invested $2.5 million in AccuRadio.

In 2015, Soon-Shiong's NantPharma purchased the drug Cynviloq from Sorrento Therapeutics for $90 million, including more than $1 billion in compensation for reaching regulatory and sales milestones. Soon-Shiong did not push forward with FDA approval as the agreement dictated, and instead allowed critical patents and deadlines to lapse, presumably due to his financial interest in another drug that would compete with Cynviloq. This "catch and kill" method of eliminating competition follows a pattern of questionable business practices by Soon-Shiong, and claims of "looting" by the celebrity actress and musician Cher.

In 2015, NantWorks LLC invested in Wibbitz in their $8 million series B funding. In July 2015, Soon-Shiong initiated an IPO for NantKwest (formerly ConkWest) that represented the highest value biotech IPO in history, at a market value of $2.6 billion. In April 2016, the Los Angeles Times reported that Soon-Shiong received a pay package in 2015 from NantKwest worth almost $148 million, making him one of the highest paid CEOs. Soon-Shiong is also a member of the Berggruen Institute's 21st Century Council.

In September 2018, his company NantEnergy announced the development of a zinc–air battery with a projected cost of $100 per kilowatt-hour, which is less than one-third the cost of lithium-ion batteries.

In 2019, Soon-Shiong became an investor in Directa Plus, a European-based graphene-based technology company, where he owns 28 percent of the company.

In early 2021, Soon-Shiong merged publicly traded NantKwest (NASDAQ: NK) with privately held ImmunityBio (formerly NantCell). The new public entity after the merger is known as ImmunityBio, Inc., trading on NASDAQ under the ticker symbol IBRX.

In 2021, Soon-Shiong announced a new investment of $29 million in a biorenewables company called NantRenewables at SeaPoint in Savannah, Georgia.

In January 2022, Soon-Shiong opened a new manufacturing facility and campus in Cape Town, South Africa with President Ramaphosa. Soon-Shiong and his entities are reported to be investing over 4 billion RAND (~$250 million) into the continent. In February, Soon-Shiong invested in Sienza, a lithium battery company in Pasadena, California.

=== Ownership of the Los Angeles Times ===
In February 2018, Soon-Shiong's investment firm NantCapital reached a deal to purchase Los Angeles Times and The San Diego Union-Tribune from Tronc Inc. for "nearly $500 million in cash" as well as the assumption of $90 million in pension obligations. Soon-Shiong, with this acquisition, became one of the first Asian-Americans to be a media proprietor through ownership in a major daily newspaper in the United States. The sale closed on June 18, 2018.

In 2020, Soon-Shiong blocked the editorial board from making any endorsement in the Democratic presidential primaries, overruling its intended endorsement of Elizabeth Warren; the paper did endorse Biden in the general election.

During Soon-Shiong's ownership of the Los Angeles Times, his daughter, Nika Soon-Shiong, became interested in the newspaper and sought to influence coverage, in both the newsroom and opinion pages. Many Times staffers expressed alarm at the younger Soon-Shiong's activity, which they viewed as meddling, including privately and publicly contacting staffers to advocate her views.

In July 2023, Soon-Shiong sold the San Diego Union-Tribune to MediaNews Group.

In October 2024, as the Los Angeles Times editorial board was preparing to endorse Kamala Harris in the 2024 United States presidential election, Soon-Shiong blocked the newspaper from making any endorsement. This was the first time since 2004 that the newspaper had not endorsed a presidential candidate. In response to Soon-Shiong's decision to block the Harris endorsement, there was a wave of subscription cancellations, staff anger, and several members of the paper's editorial board resigned in protest including editorials editor Mariel Garza and two editorial writers, Pulitzer Prize winner Robert Greene and Karin Klein. Harry Litman, a senior legal affairs columnist for the Times’ opinion page, also resigned stating, "My resignation is a protest and visceral reaction against the conduct of the paper’s owner, Dr. Patrick Soon-Shiong." Nearly 2,000 subscribers to the paper unsubscribed in the wake of the decision. A day later, TheWrap reported that the Los Angeles Times editorial board had planned a series of articles tentatively titled "The Case Against Trump" which was killed by Soon-Shiong.

In November 2024, the Los Angeles Times fired its entire editorial board, and Soon-Shiong announced plans to replace them with a new team. Soon-Shiong defended the restructuring for a "fair and balanced newspaper,” echoing the Fox News slogan. Soon-Shiong further promised a "rebirth" for the newspaper, adding "Every American’s views should be heard."

In December 2024, Soon-Shiong announced that the Los Angeles Times would employ an AI-powered bias meter into the newspaper's coverage. The announcement came after Soon-Shiong expressed his desire to include more conservative voices in the paper's opinion section, following Donald Trump's victory in the 2024 presidential election.

In January 2025, Soon-Shiong was accused of diverting the meaning of a Los Angeles Times op-ed which opposed the confirmation of Robert F. Kennedy Jr. as Health and Human Services Secretary. Soon-Shiong had previously endorsed Kennedy Jr. for the role. The op-ed's author, Eric Reinhart, said that portions of his piece which explicitly called against the confirmation were cut out without his approval, shortly before publication. One of the removed excerpts argued that Kennedy Jr. would "inflict preventable death on [millions of Americans]" due to his "egomaniacal disregard for scientific evidence". The op-ed was published under the headline "Trump’s healthcare disruption could pay off — if he pushes real reform". In contrast, Reinhart's suggested title was "RFK Jr’s Wrecking Ball Won’t Fix Public Health". When the op-ed was published, Soon-Shiong shared it on X along with a comment saying that Kennedy Jr. was "our best chance of [pushing reform in the American healthcare system]".

In October 2025, Soon-Shiong joined The Megyn Kelly Show to discuss the Los Angeles Times' refusal to publish an endorsement of Kamala Harris during the 2024 presidential election. He also discussed taking the Times public and other media trends.

In October 2026, Nant Capital, an investment firm affiliated with Patrick Soon-Shiong, completed a $10 million strategic investment in Peraso Inc. (NASDAQ: PRSO), a semiconductor company specializing in 60 GHz millimeter-wave wireless technology. The investment was intended to support Peraso's working capital and general corporate purposes. As part of the agreement, Nant Capital received certain governance rights, including the right to nominate directors to Peraso's board.

== Philanthropy ==
A 2017 Politico report found that Soon-Shiong's research foundation, the Chan Soon-Shiong NantHealth Foundation, which he named after his wife, had spent over 70% on businesses and non-profit organizations he controlled. Furthermore, it found that most of its grants were awarded to organizations that did business with Soon-Shiong's companies. The Foundation also paid some employees from Soon-Shiong's companies, which is a potentially inappropriate use of charitable funds to cover unrelated business overhead.

The foundation contributed a quarter of a $12 million donation by Soon-Shiong-controlled organizations to the University of Utah to set up a gene mapping project. Control over the grant specifications was given over to Soon-Shiong's donating organizations, and his NantHealth company was awarded the $10 million contract. A subsequent audit report by the Utah government found that the university had failed to follow the state's procurement laws requiring a competitive bidding process for public institutions. Utah House Speaker Greg Hughes described the audit as showing that the deal was "trying to Cinderella-slipper something for one person, or for one entity". The university accepted the results of the audit and said that its recommended changes would be made.

The family foundation has partnered with the Clinton Foundation. In 2023, he was recognized as one of the 100 most influential celebrities in oncology by OncoDaily.

== Politics ==
Soon-Shiong and his family were major donors to the Hillary Clinton 2016 presidential campaign. According to Politico, Soon-Shiong twice met privately with Donald Trump during his 2016–2017 presidential transition in an unsuccessful attempt to obtain a position in the administration.

== Personal life ==
Soon-Shiong is married to former actress Michele B. Chan. They have two children, including Nika Soon-Shiong, and live in Los Angeles. He has committed to the Giving Pledge and has pledged to give away at least half of his wealth to philanthropy.
