= Assured Investment Management =

American investment firm

Assured Investment Management LLC
- Formerly: BlueMountain Capital Management (2003-2020)
- Type: Subsidiary
- Industry: Financial services
- Founded: 2003; 23 years ago
- Founders: Andrew Feldstein; Stephen Siderow
- Defunct: July 1, 2023; 3 years ago
- Fate: Acquired by Sound Point Capital Management L.P.
- Headquarters: 1633 Broadway, 25th Floor, New York City, New York, U.S.
- Key people: David Buzen (CEO & CIO); Robert de Veer (CRO); Lee Kempler (COO)
- Products: Hedge fund
- AUM: US$15.2 billion (as of July 1, 2023)
- Number of employees: 29 (2023)
- Parent: Assured Guaranty Ltd. (2019-2023); Sound Point Capital Management L.P.
- Website: Archived June 19, 2023, at the Wayback Machine

Assured Investment Management (AIM) was an institutional asset management firm with a heritage in credit strategies, managing approximately $15.2 billion as of its defunct status in July 2023. Secondaries Investors referred to AIM as "one of the world's most prominent hedge funds".

Previously known as BlueMountain Capital Management, the firm was acquired by Assured Guaranty (AG) — a publicly traded financial services holding company headquartered in Bermuda — starting in 2019.

In 2023, the firm was acquired by Sound Point Capital Management (Sound Point), a privately held asset management company headquartered in United States.

== History ==
Logo used from 2011 to 2020

The company was formed in 2003 by two Harvard Law School classmates, Andrew Feldstein and Stephen Siderow. That same year, the firm launched its flagship relative value credit hedge fund with $300 million in assets under management.

In 2012, during the JPMorgan Chase trading loss incident, AIM, a hedge fund, was among the market participants that took positions opposite to those of JPMorgan's Chief Investment Office (CIO). The CIO, led by trader Bruno Iksil—commonly referred to as the "London Whale"—had established substantial positions in credit default swaps (CDS). AIM capitalized on the market movements resulting from these large-scale trades by placing bets against JPMorgan's positions. These counter-trades were initiated as early as 2012 and contributed to AIM's gains during the period of market volatility associated with JPMorgan's trading activities.

In the wake of its London whale gains, the firm's assets under management (AUM) shot up from $12 billion in 2012 to $18 billion by 2013. At the same time, the firm expanded its offering, launching five new strategies between 2012 and 2018. By 2016, the firm's AUM peaked at $23 billion.

On August 7, 2019, AG announced a definitive agreement to acquire all outstanding equity interests in BlueMountain and its affiliated entities for a total consideration of approximately $160 million, adjustable based on specified terms. Under the transaction framework, Andrew Feldstein, BlueMountain's co-founder, CEO and CIO, agreed to assume the role of CIO and Head of Asset Management at AG, retaining his existing responsibilities at BlueMountain. At least $114.8 million of the acquisition price was committed to cash payments, with the remaining $45.2 million potentially settled through a combination of cash, issuance of common shares, or a one-year promissory note, at AG's discretion. This included an anticipated issuance of $22.5 million in common shares to Feldstein. Additionally, AG pledged $60 million in initial working capital contributions to BlueMountain upon closing, with a further $30 million allocated for deployment within 12 months post-closing. The company also stated intentions to direct $500 million from its financial guaranty subsidiaries’ portfolios toward BlueMountain's asset management platform, including its CLOs, funds, and separately managed accounts, over a three-year period.

On October 1, 2019, AG completed the acquisition of BlueMountain, under terms largely consistent with those disclosed on August 7, 2019. The deal involved the purchase of all outstanding equity interests in BlueMountain and its affiliated entities for a total consideration of approximately $160 million. At the time of the acquisition, BlueMountain had approximately $18.9 billion in AUM. The transaction was funded entirely in cash. Additionally, Feldstein entered into a separate agreement to acquire $22.5 million worth of common shares in AG within the following two months, as a demonstration of his commitment to the company. Feldstein, who was one of the co-founders of BlueMountain, joined AG as CIO and Head of Asset Management. He continued to serve as CEO and CIO of BlueMountain following the acquisition. AG's President and CEO, Dominic Frederico, described the acquisition as a transformative move that brings together two firms with aligned cultural values and complementary capabilities.

On September 22, 2020, AG disclosed the rebranding of its asset management subsidiary, formerly known as BlueMountain Capital Management, which is now operating under the name Assured Investment Management. The firm focuses on structured finance, corporate and municipal credit, asset-backed finance, and private investment strategies. AIM also leverages AG's specialized knowledge in municipal finance and structured credit markets as part of its operational framework.

On April 5, 2023, AG disclosed a strategic transaction with Sound Point, under which AG agreed to transfer its full equity stake in AIM and most affiliated asset management entities to Sound Point. Concurrently, AG entered into a partnership with Sound Point to serve as AG's exclusive alternative credit manager, overseeing $1 billion in future investments across alternative credit strategies, including $400 million in existing assets as of December 31, 2022. As part of the deal, AG would receive a 30% equity stake in the merged entity, subject to potential adjustments post-closing. The transaction would transfer approximately $15.2 billion in AUM to Sound Point, comprising roughly $14.5 billion in CLOs, as of the same date. Following the transaction, Sound Point, which previously managed $21.4 billion in CLOs and $32 billion in total AUM as of December 31, 2022, was projected to rank as the fifth-largest CLO manager globally by AUM. Assured Healthcare Partners (AHP), an independent healthcare investment management firm, would remain unaffiliated with the transaction. AG would retain carried interest rights tied to AHP funds and a separate single-asset fund in which it held an investment.

On July 3, 2023, AG finalized the integration of nearly all its asset management operations, excluding AHP, with Sound Point. Effective July 1, 2023, AG transferred its full equity holdings in AIM and associated asset management entities, aside from AHP-related exceptions, to Sound Point, welcoming 29 employees from AIM into the organization. Concurrently, an investment agreement designating Sound Point as AG's exclusive alternative credit manager was activated, committing up to $1 billion over time to alternative credit strategies managed by Sound Point, inclusive of approximately $400 million previously overseen by AIM. In exchange, AG secured a 30% ownership stake in Sound Point's consolidated business, subject to potential adjustments post-closing. Following the transaction, Sound Point ranks as the fifth-largest global CLO manager by AUM. Dominic Frederico, AG's President and CEO, was appointed to Sound Point's Board of Managers.

On July 21, 2023, AG announced the transfer of its equity stake in AHP to an entity controlled by the company's founder, Jim Pieri. Pieri has served as managing partner and CIO of AHP since its establishment as a healthcare-focused investment manager.

== Investments ==
AIM held significant debt from the Puerto Rico Electric Power Authority (PREPA) during the island's financial crisis. The firm joined a coalition of hedge funds and financial institutions opposing legislative efforts to grant Puerto Rico access to bankruptcy protections. This coalition hired multiple lobbying firms, including DCI Group, and collaborated with conservative organizations to frame bankruptcy as a taxpayer-funded bailout. Their efforts influenced congressional debates, contributing to delays in federal relief legislation. Following Congress's passage of the Puerto Rico Oversight, Management, and Economic Stability Act in June 2016, Brave New Films — a production company with reported ties to George Soros — released two documentaries criticizing AIM's PREPA investments. The films highlighted the debt crisis's effects on Puerto Rico's health care and education systems. AIM declined to comment on the films when contacted by media.
