= Sunny Bhatia =

American cardiologist

- Born: Sundeep Bhatia
- Education: University of Minnesota Medical School, University of Pennsylvania
- Occupations: Physician; healthcare executive
- Known for: President of Prime Healthcare Services

Sunny Bhatia is a physician and healthcare executive who serves as president and chief medical officer of Prime Healthcare Services, a national hospital system based in Ontario, California.

Bhatia is a Fellow of the American College of Cardiology and the American College of Healthcare Executives. In December 2025, Bhatia was named among Modern Healthcare's 100 Most Influential People in Healthcare list.

== Education ==
Bhatia received his medical degree from the University of Minnesota Medical School, 2001 class, and holds a Master of Medical Management (MMM) degree from the USC Marshall School of Business in Los Angeles.

== Career ==
Bhatia joined Prime Healthcare in 2011 as chief medical officer (CMO) of Sherman Oaks Hospital and Encino Hospital Medical Center. During his tenure, Sherman Oaks Hospital was recognized multiple times as one of the nation's "100 Top Hospitals" by IBM Watson Health.

In 2016, he was promoted to CMO of Prime Healthcare and later became CEO of the company's West Coast region. In 2024, he was appointed the health system's first national president.

In 2024, he oversaw Prime Healthcare's acquisition of nine hospitals from the U.S. Catholic health system Ascension, and the acquisition of Saint Francis Hospital in Illinois for $350 million. In the same year, Bhatia participated in Prime Healthcare's negotiations with the State of California regarding CalOptima contracts at four Orange County hospitals.

=== Faculty career ===
Bhatia serves as associate professor of medical education at the California University of Science and Medicine in Colton, San Bernardino County. He has established the Bhatia Family Scholarship for Future Community-Based Physicians at the University of Minnesota Medical School.

== Fellowship and recognitions ==
Bhatia is a board-certified interventional cardiologist. He is a Fellow of the American College of Cardiology, the Society for Cardiac Angiography and Interventions, and the American College of Healthcare Executives.

In 2019, he was named Healthcare Innovator of the Year by The Millennium Alliance. In 2025, he was included in Modern Healthcare's 100 Most Influential People in Healthcare list. He has also been named to the publication's Most Influential Clinical Executives list. He was recognized by Becker's Hospital Review on its lists of hospital and health system Chief Medical Officers to Know in 2022 and 2026. In 2026, Bhatia was recognized as one of LA's Top Doctors: Leaders of Influence.
