= Javed Siddiqi =

American neurosurgeon (born 1962)

- Born: 1962 (age 63–64)
- Education: University of Western Ontario; Oxford University
- Medical career
- Profession: Neurosurgeon
- Institutions: California University of Science and Medicine Arrowhead Regional Medical Center
- Sub-specialties: Skull base neurosurgery

Javed Siddiqi (born 1962) is a Canadian neurosurgeon. Siddiqi attended the University of Western Ontario, where he got an undergraduate degree in neurophysiology, later becoming a Rhodes scholar, getting a DPhill in International Relations at Christ Church, Oxford, before returning to the University of Western Ontario School of Medicine to acquire an M.D. Afterwards, he would go on to do a skull base and vascular fellowship under Dr. Gazi Yaşargil at the University of Arkansas. In 1996 Siddiqi moved to the Inland Empire to being practice at Arrowhead Regional Medical Center. Siddiqi currently serves as the Chair of Surgery/Neurosurgery at the California University of Science and Medicine. Siddiqi is the founder, and editor-in-chief of the medical journal "Contemporary Reviews in Neurology and Neurosurgery".

== Membership ==
- Vice-president of the Western Neurosurgical Society (2021–2022)
- President of the California Association of Neurological Surgeons (2022–2023)
- President-elect of the Western Neurosurgical Society (for 2025–2026)

== Publications ==
Siddiqi has published 80 papers, and published three books.

=== Books ===
- World Health and World Politics: The World Health Organization and the UN System (London: Hurst and Company, 1995)
- In Their Hands (New York: Thieme Medical Publishers, 2002)
- Neurosurgical Intensive Care (New York: Thieme Medical Publishers, 2008)
