= La Palma Intercommunity Hospital =

- Prime Healthcare Services, Inc.

Geography
- Location: La Palma, California, United States
- Coordinates: 33.8474°N 118.0384°W

Organization
- Care system: Private
- Type: Community
- Affiliated university: None

Services
- Beds: 141

History
- Founded: 1972

Links
- Website: http://www.lapalmaintercommunityhospital.com/
- Lists: Hospitals in California

La Palma Intercommunity Hospital (LPH) is a 141-bed acute care facility in La Palma, California, US. LPH is owned and operated by Prime Healthcare Services (PHS), a hospital management company located in Victorville. PHS was founded in 2001 by Prem Reddy, who acts as its present chairman of the board. PHS has operated La Palma Intercommunity Hospital since 2006.

== History ==
La Palma Intercommunity Hospital was founded as a general acute care hospital in 1972 and has gone through several ownership changes since its founding.

One of the first changes came in 1988 when the hospital's non-profit owners, HealthWest Foundation of Chatsworth, merged their services with another non-profit Southern California healthcare provider, LHS Corp., to create UniHealth America.

UniHealth America continued to operate LPH until 1998 when UniHealth faced financial challenges and was acquired by Catholic Healthcare West (CHW).

LPH's operation under Catholic Healthcare West was short lived, when the Catholic system divested LPH and another nearby Orange County hospital, Martin Luther Hospital Anaheim, to MemorialCare Health Systems after less than a year under CHW control. At the time, the operators discussed plans to consolidate services of the two hospitals and potential converting LPH to non-acute healthcare services.

MemorialCare Health Systems plans for LPH never came to fruition as the Long Beach-based non-profit sold the facility in December 1999 to for-profit Vanguard Health Systems, ending LPH's status as a non-profit facility.

Prime Healthcare Services purchased La Palma Intercommunity Hospital on October 1, 2006, from Vanguard Health Systems, along with two other Orange County acute care facilities, West Anaheim Medical Center and Huntington Beach Hospital, in a $40 million transaction.

== See also ==
- Prime Healthcare Services
- List of Prime Healthcare Services Hospitals

== Services ==
- 24-hour basic emergency
- Cardio-Neuro
- Cardiovascular Lab
- Imaging Services - Digital Filmless Radiology
- Clinical Lab
- Critical Care/Stepdown Unit
- Surgical Services
- Pharmacy
- Outpatient Physical Therapy
- Bio-Medical
- Women's Care - Centers of Excellence

== Awards and recognitions ==
- Accreditation by JACHO
