= Dominican University of California =

Private university in San Rafael, California

- Former names: Dominican College (1890–1931); Dominican College of San Rafael (1931–2000)
- Motto: Veritas Fax Ardens (Latin)
- Motto in English: Truth is a Flaming Torch
- Type: Private university
- Established: 1890; 136 years ago
- Founder: Dominican Congregation of the Most Holy Name
- Academic affiliations: CIC; CONAHEC; NAICU
- Endowment: $33 million
- President: Nicola Pitchford
- Students: 1,720
- Undergraduates: 1,054
- Postgraduates: 627
- Other students: 39
- Location: San Rafael, California, United States; 37°58′47″N 122°30′48″W
- Campus: Suburban 80 acres (32 ha)
- Colors: (Black, gold, and white)
- Nickname: Penguins
- Sporting affiliations: NCAA Division II – PacWest
- Mascot: Chilly the Penguin
- Website: dominican.edu
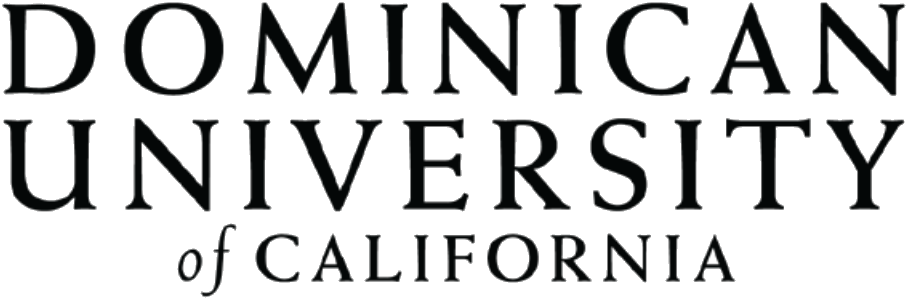

Dominican University of California is a private university in San Rafael, California, United States. It was founded in 1890 as Dominican College by the Dominican Sisters of San Rafael. It is one of the oldest universities in California.

Dominican is accredited by the Western Association of Schools and Colleges (WASC). More than 60 academic majors, minors and concentrations, including 11 graduate programs are offered with an average class size of 16. During the 2023–24 school year, Dominican had 1182 undergraduate students and 844 graduate students. Enrollment by gender is 72% female and 28% male.

The university is a member of NCAA Division II and competes in the Pacific West Conference.

== History ==
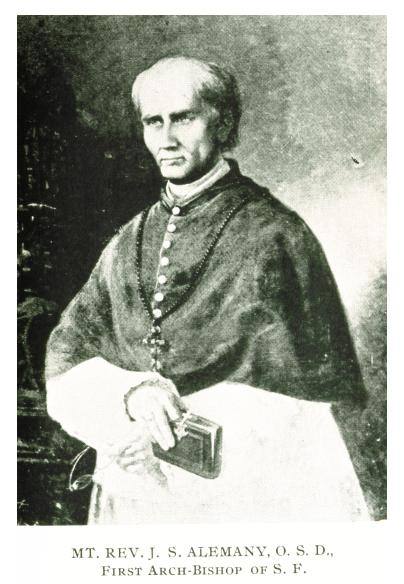
Bishop Joseph Alemany

In 1850, Joseph Sadoc Alemany was appointed Bishop of Monterey. While in France that year, Alemany sought Dominican sisters to join him in California to establish a convent and school in Monterey. Years later, Mother Mary Goemaere and Mother Louis O'Donnell moved the congregation from Monterey to Benicia, and then to San Rafael in 1889. In 1890, the Dominican Sisters of San Rafael formally registered their school with the State of California. The school became a junior college in 1915. In 1917, it became known as Dominican College.

Dominican College became the first Catholic college in California to grant the bachelor's degree to women. Originally a female-only institution, Dominican College became coeducational in 1971. In 2000, the school changed its name from Dominican College to Dominican University of California.

== Campus ==
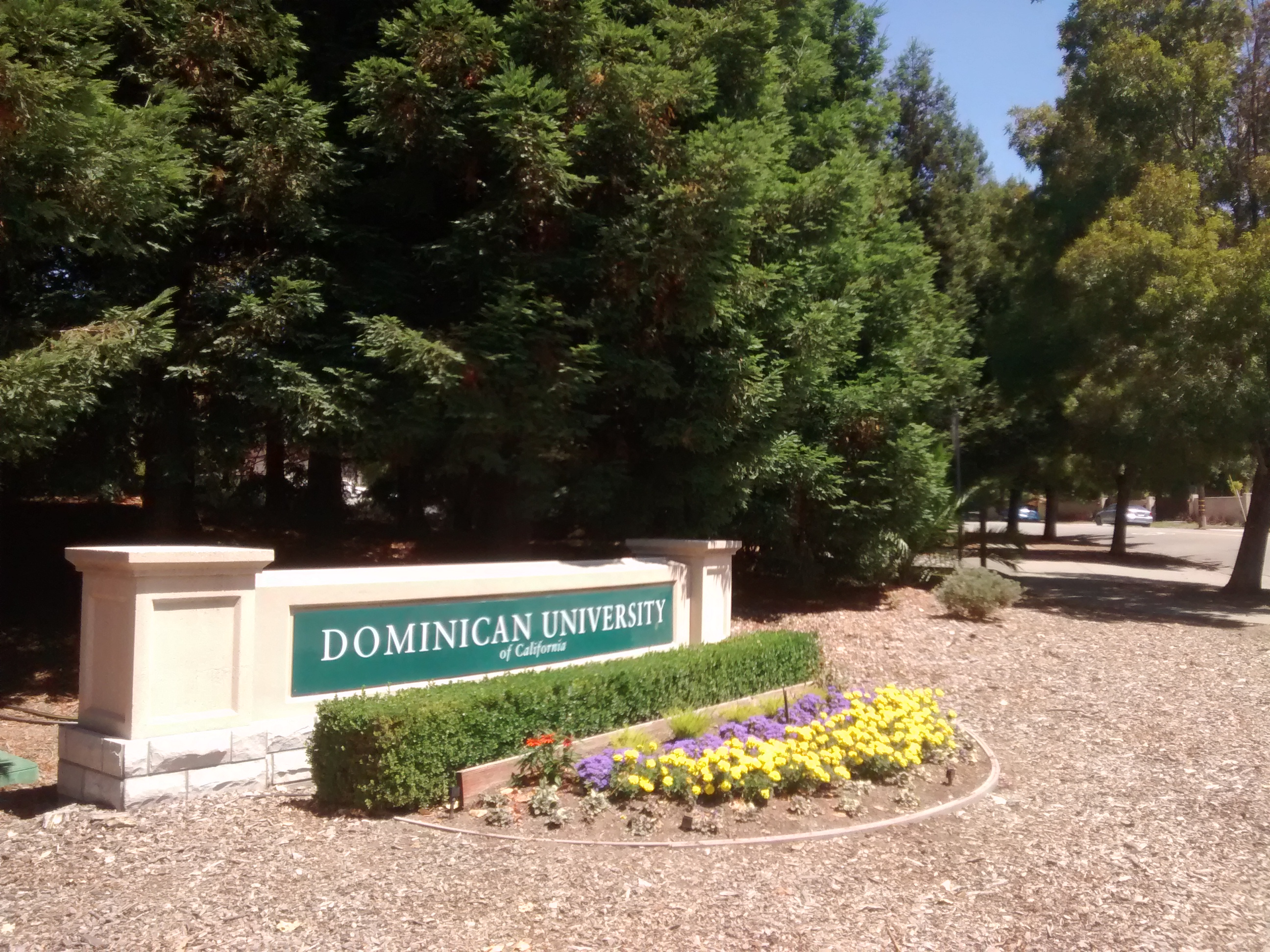

Dominican occupies approximately 80 acres (32 ha) in central Marin County in the City of San Rafael. It is situated in a residential neighborhood at the base of San Pedro Mountain.

=== Notable buildings ===
==== Angelico Hall ====
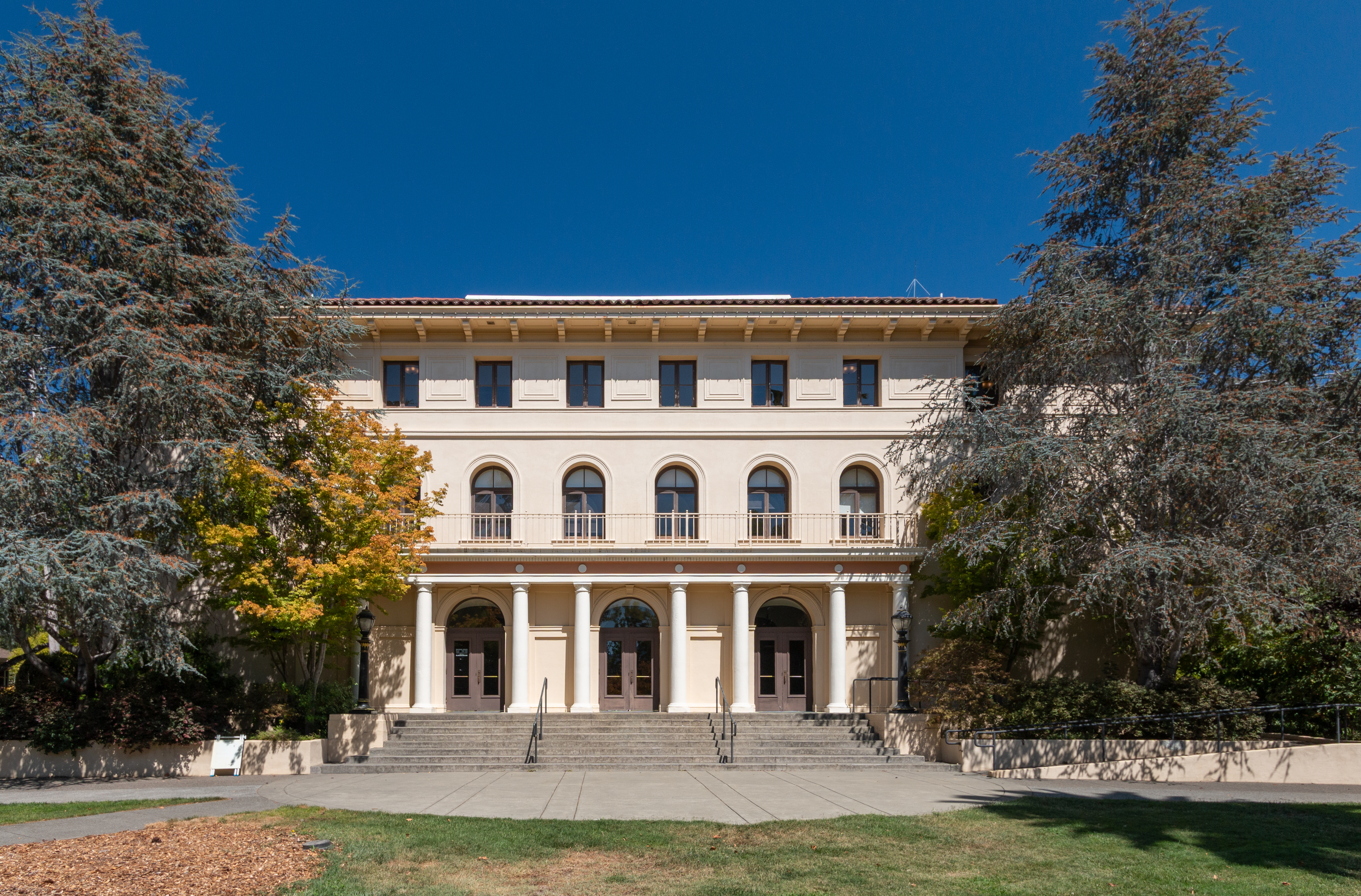
Angelico Hall

Angelico Hall features an auditorium with seating for 800 people. It was designed by Morris Brude and completed in 1921. It currently houses the Liberal Arts & Education offices, music practice rooms and the auditorium. The auditorium regularly hosts concerts, symphonies, and lecture series. The 2010 California gubernatorial debate between Jerry Brown and Meg Whitman took place at Angelico Hall.

==== Meadowlands Hall ====
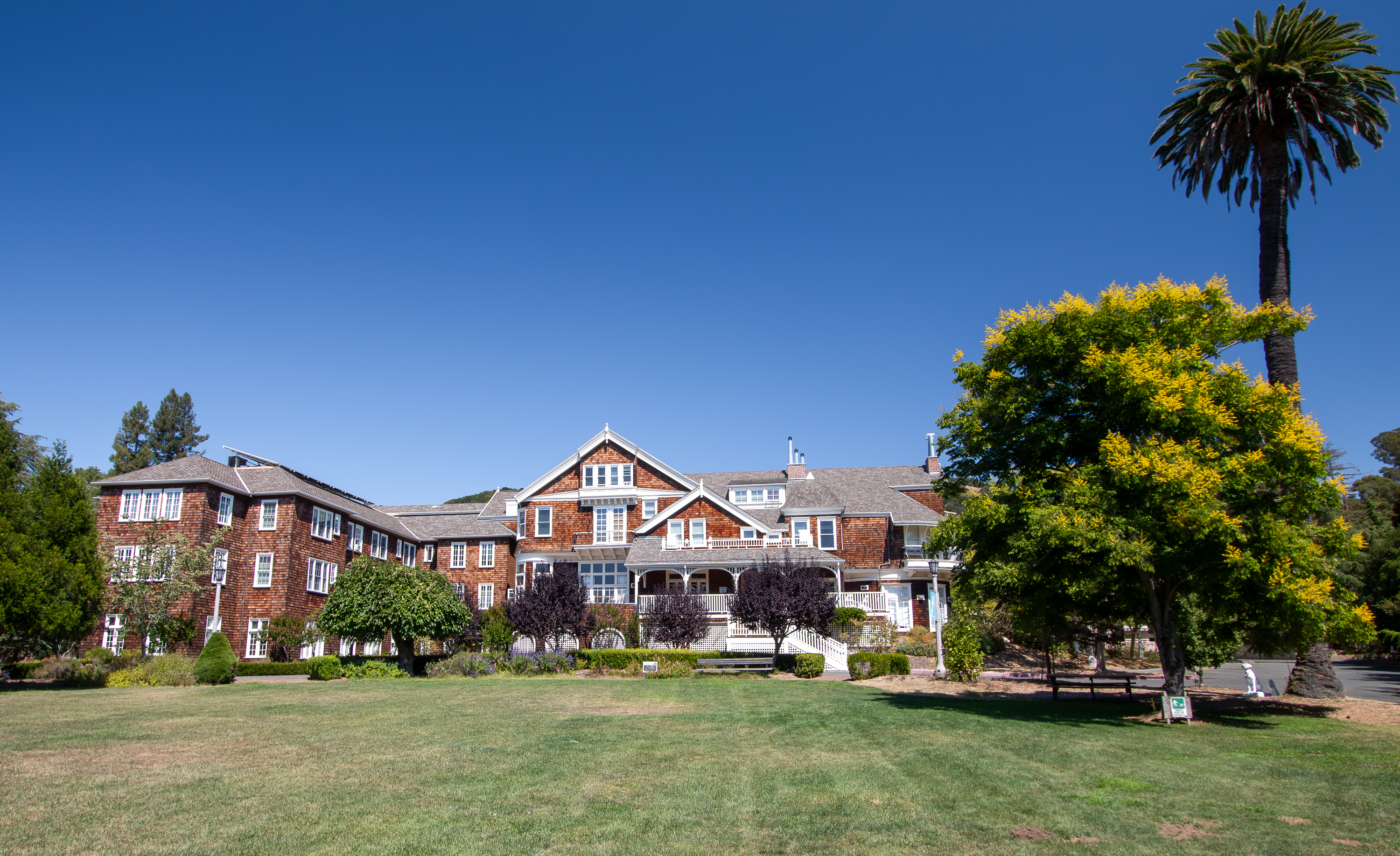
Meadowlands Hall

Meadowlands Hall currently serves as the offices and classrooms for the Departments of Nursing, Occupational Therapy, Public Health and Health Sciences. The building was originally built in 1888 as a summer home for Michael de Young, a San Francisco journalist and businessman. It was acquired by the Dominican Sisters in 1918. At that time the first floor was converted into classrooms, while the upper floors served as student residences. In 2015, the building underwent major renovations to create space for labs and offices, while maintaining its historical integrity and improving its fire safety.

=== Points of interest ===
In 2002, Dominican University of California exhibited a long-unseen cache of more than 70 Ansel Adams photographs that had been found on campus years earlier. The images, originally created by Adams for the college, became part of Dominican's collection.

Forest Meadows Amphitheater is an amphitheater on Dominican's Campus. It has been used to hold the university's Commencement ceremonies. The amphitheater is now used by the Marin Shakespeare Company during the Shakespeare Festival in the fall. The company has been using the amphitheater since 1989.

== Academics ==
The university is organized into three schools: the School of Liberal Arts & Education; the School of Health & Natural Sciences; and the Barowsky School of Business.

Dominican offers undergraduate degrees in the arts, humanities, social sciences, business, education, health, and natural sciences. Graduate programs span a variety of fields including business, health, science, education, creative writing, cybersecurity, art therapy, and counseling psychology.

Dominican offers an Adult Degree Completion program aimed at working professionals (age 24+) seeking a completion of a bachelor's degree through evening and adult-learner formats.

== Student life ==
=== Shield Day ===
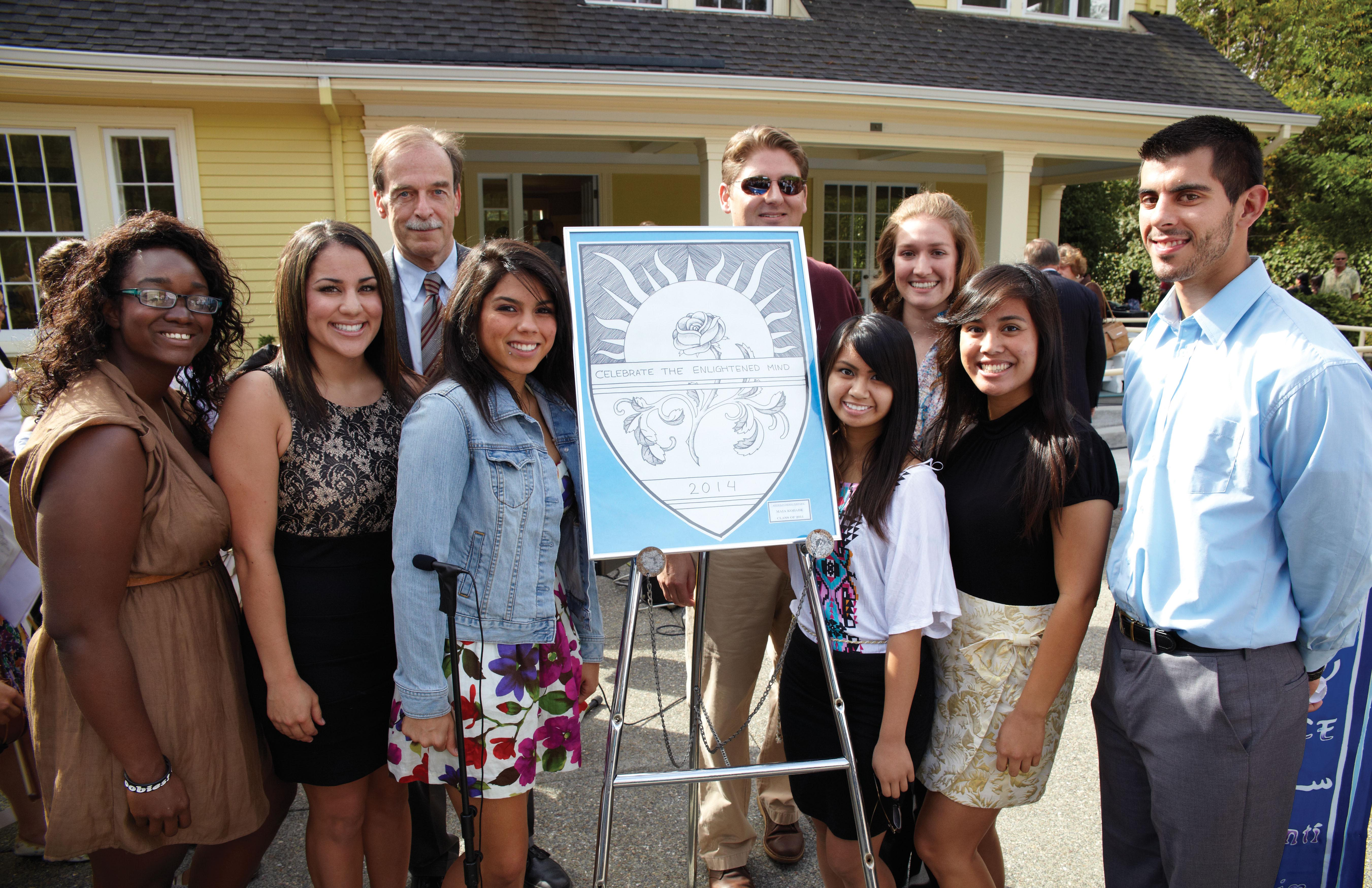
Shield Ceremony at Dominican University of California

Each fall, the university holds a Shield Ceremony, a tradition that started in the 12th century when Saint Dominic Guzman created the Dominican order. It now continues every fall during Convocation, when the Dominican seniors officially greet the incoming freshmen with a special gift: an illustration of a shield that reflects an inspirational motto. The motto, written by the seniors, is intended to help guide the freshmen throughout their college years and beyond. Four years later at Commencement, a hand-crafted wood carving of the illustrated shield is presented to the graduating class. All of Dominican's shields, dating back to the early 1920s, are displayed on campus in the Meadowlands Residence Hall, Guzman Lecture Hall and the Shield Room.

== Athletics ==
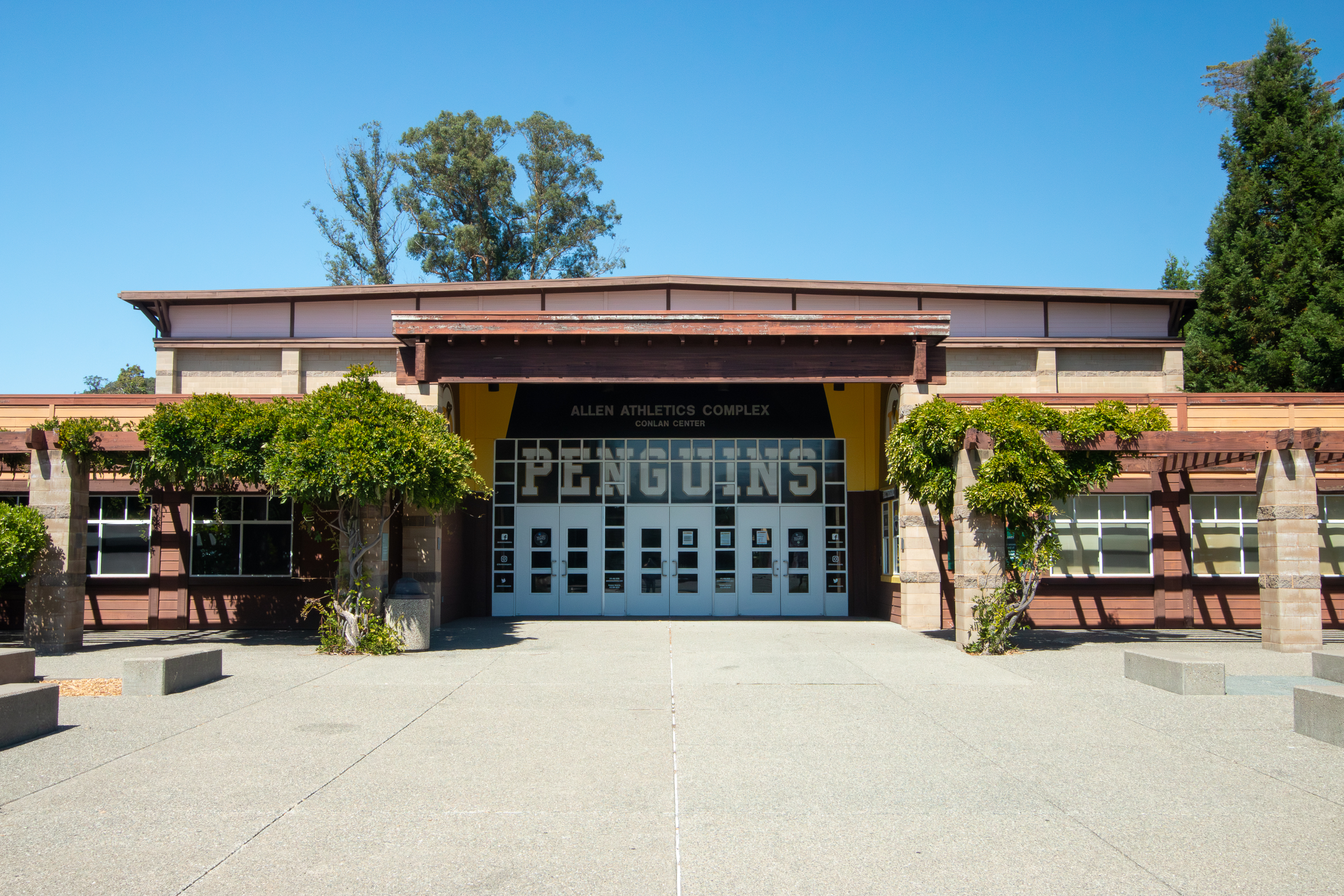
Conlan Center

The Dominican athletic teams are called the Penguins. The university is a member of the Division II level of the National Collegiate Athletic Association (NCAA), primarily competing in the Pacific West Conference. The men's Lacrosse team competes in the Western Collegiate Lacrosse League (WCLL) at the Division I level of the Men's Collegiate Lacrosse Association (MCLA). The university previously competed in the California Pacific Conference (Cal Pac) of the National Association of Intercollegiate Athletics (NAIA) from 1996–1997 to 2008–2009.

Dominican fields 15 intercollegiate athletic teams (6 men's and 9 women's). The facilities for sports and recreations programs are the Conlan Center and the John F. Allen Sports Complex - which includes Kennelly Field, Castellluci Family Tennis Center, and Penguin Field.

== Notable people ==
- Etel Adnan, Lebanese writer and artist, philosophy professor, 1952–1972
- Melba Beals, journalist, was among the nine African-American teenagers who over 50 years ago advanced the civil rights movement with the integration of Little Rock Central High School in Little Rock, Arkansas. Today, Beals lives in the San Francisco Bay Area, and teaches journalism at Dominican University of California, where she is the chair of the communications department.
- Urso Chappell, graphic designer, writer, and world's fair historian.
- Marion Irvine, "The Flying Nun", broke numerous age-group records in distance running events.
- Abigail Kinoiki Kekaulike Kawānanakoa, member of the House of Kawānanakoa. She is commonly referred to as a princess despite never officially being granted such a title.
- Killian Larson, American professional basketball player who currently plays in Europe.
- Seán Mac Falls, Irish poet, songwriter, and Literary Arts philanthropist.
- Angela Salinas, first Hispanic female to become a United States Marine Corps general officer.
- Hannah Stocking, American YouTuber, internet personality, and model

== See also ==
- List of colleges and universities in California
