= Kavitha Bhatia =

Indian-American physician

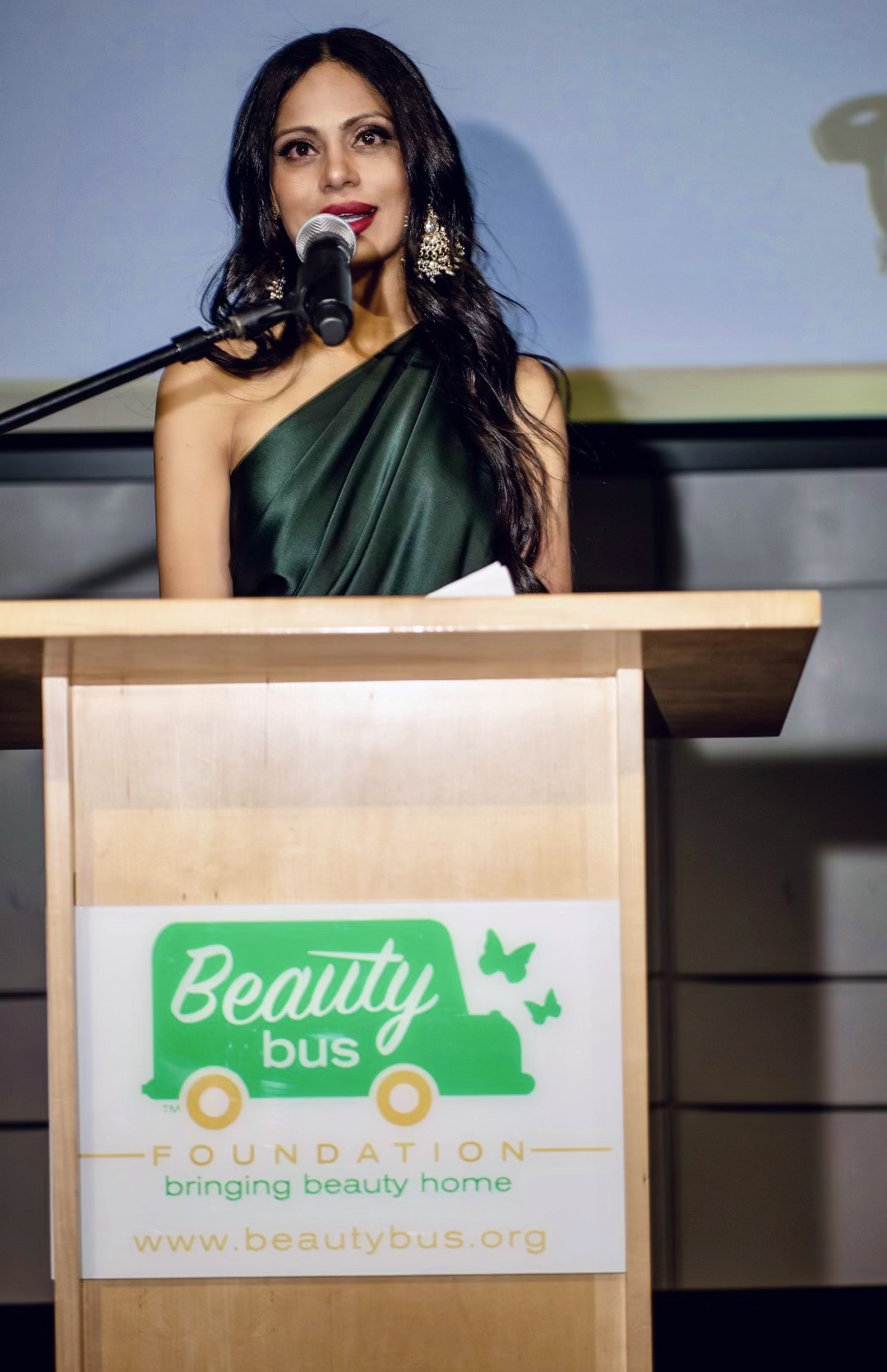
- Born: India
- Education: Master of Medical Management from the USC Marshall School of Business, Doctor of Medicine (MD)
- Alma mater: UCLA School of Medicine
- Known for: President and Chair of Prime Healthcare Foundation
- Website: www.primehealthcare.com/kavitha-bhatia-md-mmm-faap-fache/

Kavitha Bhatia is a physician who is the president and chair of the Prime Healthcare Foundation.. Her father, Prem Reddy, is the Founder, Chairman & CEO of Prime Healthcare.

== Education ==
Dr. Bhatia, a Phi Beta Kappa scholar, earned her Bachelor of Science in Physiology and Neuroscience from UC San Diego and her medical degree with honors from UCLA School of Medicine, where she also received Letters of Distinction in Doctoring; she holds a Healthcare Strategy Certificate from Harvard Business School and a Master of Medical Management from USC Marshall, and has been a scholar at prestigious institutions, including Mass General and Boston Children’s Hospital, while also being a Fellow of the American Academy of Pediatrics.

== Career ==
Bhatia currently serves as the president and chair of the Prime Healthcare Foundation. She is also the Chief Medical Officer of Strategy for Prime Healthcare and an associate professor of Medical Education at the California University of Science and Medicine (CUSM).

Bhatia serves on the Board of Directors of the California Hospital Association and the Federation of American Hospitals. She is a Founding Vice Chair of the board of trustees at the California University of Science and Medicine (CUSM).

During the COVID-19 pandemic, Bhatia served as the chair of Prime Healthcare's National COVID Committee and COVID 24/7 Command Center.

== Awards and recognition ==
- 1996 - Received a Miraculous Medallion from Mother Teresa for her work with the Missionaries of Charity
- 2020 and 2021 - Finalist for the Inspirational Woman by the Los Angeles Times
- 2022 - Inspirational Leadership Award from the Beauty Bus Foundation for leadership of Prime Healthcare during the COVID-19 pandemic
- 2022 - Leaders of Influence: Top L.A. Doctors honors notable Pediatrics
- 2023 - Inspirational Women 2023 Honorees & Finalists by Los Angeles Times.
- 2024 - Recognized as a "Woman of Influence" in healthcare by the Los Angeles Business Journal
- 2024- Inspirational Women 2024 Finalists in Healthcare by LA Times Studios
- 2025 – Becker’s Hospital Great Leaders in Healthcare

== See also ==
- Prime Healthcare Services
- Prem Reddy
