= MHMC =

MHMC may refer to:

- Mayanei Hayeshua Medical Center, a Haredi hospital in Bnei Brak, Israel
- Montclair Hospital Medical Center, a hospital in Montclair, California
