= Desert Valley Hospital =

Coordinates: 34°28′16″N 117°17′55″W

- Prime Healthcare Services, Inc.

Geography
- Location: Victorville, California, United States

Organization
- Care system: Private
- Type: Community
- Affiliated university: None

Services
- Beds: 148

History
- Opened: 1994

Links
- Website: http://www.dvmc.com/
- Lists: Hospitals in California

Desert Valley Hospital (DVH) is an 148-bed osteopathic acute care facility in the city of Victorville, San Bernardino County, California. It serves the Victor Valley region of the south−central Mojave Desert.

DVH is currently owned and operated by Prime Healthcare Services, Inc. (PHS), a hospital management company located in Ontario, California. PHS was founded in 2001 by Prem Reddy, who is its present chairman of the board. The hospital is accredited by the American Osteopathic Association's Healthcare Facilities Accreditation Program.

== History ==
The 1994 hospital groundbreaking ceremonies included Roy Rogers, a local resident in Apple Valley.

The hospital had 7,179 admissions, 1,070 inpatient procedures, 597 surgeries, and its emergency room had 32,392 visits in 2012.

== Services ==
- 24-hour basic emergency
- Cardiovascular-neurological
- Cardiovascular laboratory
- Imaging services - digital filmless radiology
- Clinical laboratory
- Critical care/Stepdown unit
- Surgical services
- Pharmacy
- Outpatient physical therapy
- Bio-medical

== Controversy ==
In 2005, two former nurses at Desert Valley Hospital won a lawsuit in which they claimed they were improperly fired after they accused hospital management of providing inadequate care to save money and Reddy of repeatedly reporting to work while under the influence of alcohol. In February 1999, Reddy was arrested for allegedly attacking Dr. Harry Lifschutz at Desert Valley Medical Group. Reddy jumped over a desk in the doctor's waiting room and allegedly attempted to choke him and take a laptop from Lifschutz's office.

== Awards and recognition ==
- Truven Health Analytics (formerly Thomson Reuters) Top 100 Hospital 7 years, including 2013.
- Top Hospital of Top 10% of Pacificare's Hospital Quality Index amongst the hospitals in California
- Highest Achievable Scores by American Osteopathic Association (AOA)
- Ranked #45 of California hospitals and #3 in the San Bernardino - Riverside, California, metropolitan area by U.S. News & World Report.

== List of famous patients ==
- Dale Evans
- Roy Rogers

== See also ==
- Prime Healthcare Services
- List of hospitals in California
