= Marin Shakespeare Company =

Theatre company in Marin county

Coordinates: 37.97921°N 122.51762°W

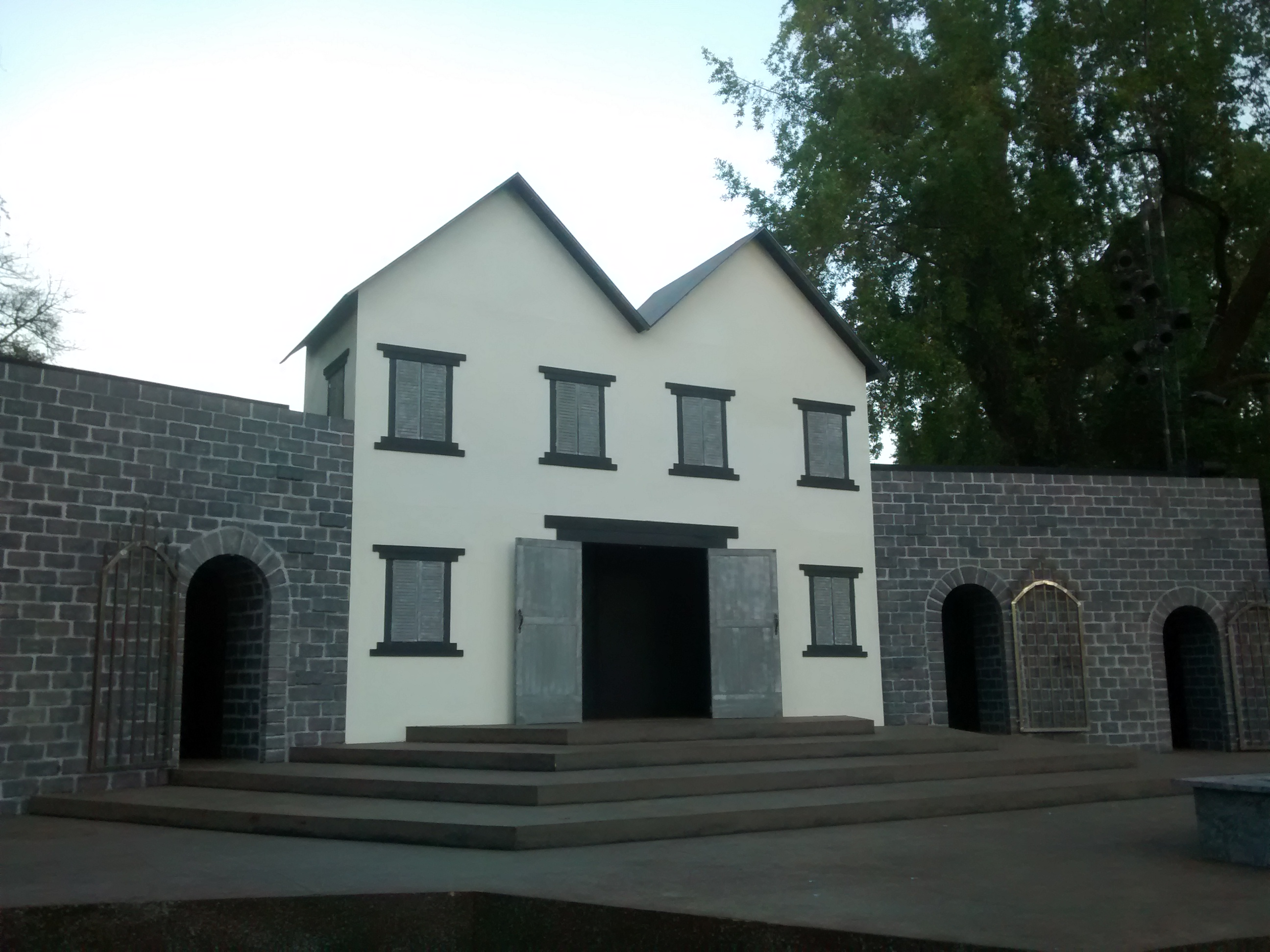
The Forest Meadows Amphitheater stage before a Marin Shakespeare Company performance of Romeo and Juliet.

The Marin Shakespeare Company is a non-profit corporation that was established in 1989 at Dominican College’s Forest Meadows Amphitheatre in San Rafael, California, by Lesley Schisgall Currier and Robert Currier.

The company’s primary programs are: Mainstage summer season at the Forest Meadows Amphitheatre; year-round classes for people of all ages; Shakespeare for Social Justice programs; and Shakespeare events all year round.

According to the company's mission statement: "With Shakespeare as our endless inspiration, our mission is to serve as a vibrant catalyst for cultural engagement, education, and social justice to benefit the people of Marin County, the San Francisco Bay Area, and beyond." The company is listed as a Major Festival in the book, Shakespeare Festivals Around the World, by Marcus D. Gregio.

== History ==
The original Marin Shakespeare Festival, founded by John and Ann Brebner, produced outdoor Shakespearean theatre at the Ross Art and Garden Center for 6 seasons from 1961 to 1967. That year the Forest Meadows Amphitheater was built for the Shakespeare Festival where it remained until 1972, before producing a final season at San Francisco's Palace of Fine Arts in 1973.

In 1989, Robert and Lesley Currier came to Marin to revive the defunct festival. Their first production of "As You Like It" was performed at Forest Meadows in 1990.

The company grew to offer three summer performances, education programming including summer camps and year-round classes, in-schools classes, Student Matinees, and the Teen Touring Company.

In 2001, Marin Shakespeare Company celebrated the 40th anniversary of the founding of California's first outdoor Shakespeare festival.

== Shakespeare for Social Justice Programs ==
In 2003, the company began Shakespeare for Social Justice programs, with classes offered at San Quentin State Prison. Shakespeare for Social Justice has served 14 California State Prisons and Alameda Juvenile Hall. The program includes classes in Shakespeare, original writing/performing, and Acting for Veterans which allows military Veterans to tell their stories through theatre. Dozens of performances from inside prisons are available for viewing on the company's YouTube page.

== Company ==
In 2023, under the leadership of Lesley and Robert Currier, the company opened the Center for Arts, Education, and Social Justice at 514 Fourth Street in San Rafael.

The Marin Shakespeare Company is part of the Shakespeare Theatre Association (STA).
