= Centralia Elementary School District =

School district in California, United States

Address
- 7300 La Palma Ave (temporary location) Buena Park, California; United States

District information
- Type: Public
- Grades: TK–6
- Established: 1875
- Superintendent: Norma Martinez
- Schools: 8
- Budget: $44.5 million
- NCES District ID: 0608070

Students and staff
- Students: 4,044 (2020–2021)
- Teachers: 155.0 (FTE)
- Staff: 206.95 (FTE)
- Student–teacher ratio: 26.09:1

Other information
- Website: www.cesd.us

Centralia Elementary School District is a public school district based in Orange County, California, United States.

The district Includes much of southern Buena Park and sections of Anaheim, Cypress, and La Palma. The district teaches Preschool through 6th graders.

== Schools ==
- Buena Terra Elementary School - Buena Park
- Centralia Elementary School - Anaheim
- Danbrook Elementary School - Anaheim
- Glen H. Dysinger Sr. Elementary School - Buena Park
- Los Coyotes Elementary School - La Palma
- George B. Miller Elementary School - La Palma
- Raymond Temple Elementary School - Buena Park
- San Marino Elementary School - Buena Park

== History ==
Established in 1875, the District's eight elementary schools currently serve 4,500 students in the cities of Anaheim, Buena Park, Cypress, and La Palma. Centralia School District was the first school district in California to provide free textbooks to students, and today is one of only three school districts in Orange County that is not "program improvement". In 2019, the Centralia School District was the first school district in the State of California to offer universal preschool.

According to the 2010 Census, the District's resident population is 55,193 with a demographic of 34% Hispanic, 30% White, 29% Asian, 4% Black, and 3% Other/Mixed Race.

== Board of trustees ==
The District is governed by a five-member elected Board of Trustees. In 2014, twenty-year-old Chapman University student Connor Traut was elected to the board of trustees as the youngest Trustee in District history.

Current Trustees are: Henry Charoen, Jerry Flores, Elizabeth Gonzalez, and Art Montez. The Area 4 Trustee has been vacant since its representative, Lamiya Hoque, was elected to the Buena Park City Council.
