= Saint Mary's Regional Medical Center (Reno, Nevada) =

Hospital in Reno, Nevada, U.S.

- Prime Healthcare Services
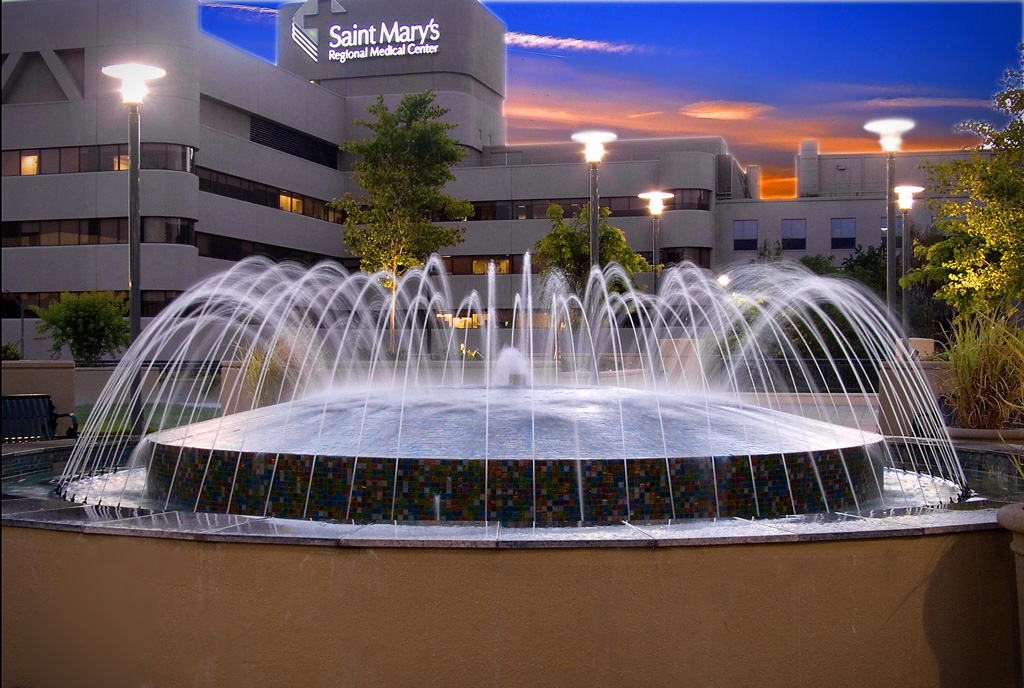

Geography
- Location: 235 West 6th Street, Reno, Nevada, U.S.
- Coordinates: 39.531783°N 119.818137°W

Organisation
- Care system: Private
- Type: General and Teaching
- Affiliated university: University of Nevada, Reno School of Medicine (1969–present)
- Network: Prime Healthcare Services

Services
- Standards: Joint Commission
- Emergency department: Yes
- Beds: 380

Helipads
- Helipad: FAA LID: NV58

History
- Founded: 1908; 118 years ago

Links
- Website: saintmarysreno.com
- Lists: Hospitals in U.S.

Saint Mary's Regional Medical Center is a for-profit hospital in Reno, Nevada, United States. It is owned and operated by Prime Healthcare Services.

== History ==
The Dominican Sisters of San Rafael opened Sister's Hospital in 1908. The sisters had been living in the area since 1877 and had previously opened Mount Saint Mary's Academy. In 1912, a new facility was added and the hospital was renamed Saint Mary's Hospital. Additions have since been added at that original site, leading to today's Saint Mary's Regional Medical Center.

Saint Mary's became an affiliate of Catholic Healthcare West in 2006. Saint Mary's lost money under CHW ownership and in 2012, the hospital was sold to the for-profit Prime Healthcare Services.
