= Sherman Oaks Hospital =

- Prime Healthcare Services, Inc.

Geography
- Location: Sherman Oaks, California, United States

Organization
- Care system: Private
- Type: Community
- Affiliated university: None

Services
- Beds: 153

History
- Founded: 1969

Links
- Website: https://shermanoakshospital.org/
- Lists: Hospitals in California

Sherman Oaks Hospital (SOH) is a 153-bed acute care facility on Van Nuys Boulevard in the city of Los Angeles neighborhood of Sherman Oaks, California. It had 3,995 admissions during the most recent year such data was made available.

SOH is owned and operated by Prime Healthcare Services, a hospital management company located in Victorville, California; it was founded in 2001 by Prem Reddy, who acts as its chairman of the board.

Sherman Oaks Hospital is accredited by the American Osteopathic Association's Healthcare Facilities Accreditation Program.

The hospital is the former home of the well-known Grossman Burn Center, which—after being in the hospital for forty years—moved fourteen miles away in 2010 to West Hills Hospital and Medical Center.

== Services ==
- 24-hour basic emergency
- Cardiovascular-Neurological
- Cardiovascular Lab
- Imaging Services - Digital Filmless Radiology
- Clinical Lab
- Critical Care/Stepdown Unit
- Surgical Services
- Pharmacy
- Outpatient Physical Therapy
- Bio-Medical
- Partial Hospitalization Program and Intensive Outpatient Program
