= Joseph Sadoc Alemany =

Spanish priest

His Excellency, The Most Reverend Joseph Sadoc Alemany O.P.
- Archbishop of San Francisco
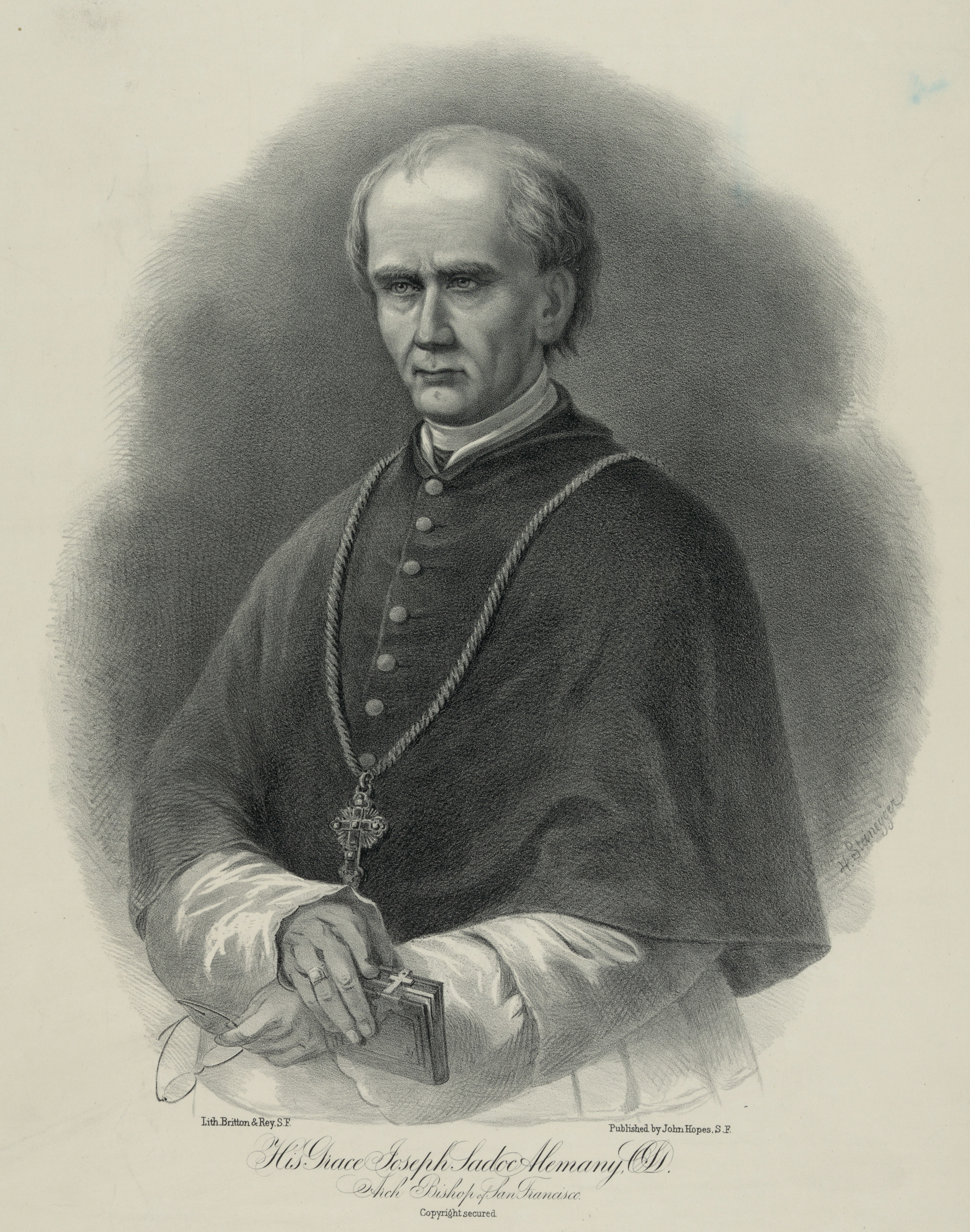
- See: San Francisco
- Installed: July 29, 1853
- Term ended: December 28, 1884
- Successor: Patrick William Riordan
- Other post: Bishop of Monterey (1850–1853)

Orders
- Ordination: March 11, 1837 by Gaspare Bernardo Pianetti
- Consecration: June 30, 1850 by Giacomo Filippo Fransoni

Personal details
- Born: Josep Sadoc Alemany i Conill; July 3, 1814 Vic, Catalonia, Spain
- Died: April 14, 1888 (aged 73) Valencia, Spain
- Buried: Church of Sant Domènec, Vic, Catalonia, Spain (1888-1965); Holy Cross Cemetery, Colma, California, United States
- Denomination: Roman Catholic Church
- Parents: Antoni Alemany i Font & Miquela dels Sants Conill i Saborit
- Education: Pontifical University of Saint Thomas Aquinas

Styles of Joseph Sadoc Alemany
- Reference style: The Most Reverend
- Spoken style: Your Excellency
- Religious style: Monsignor
- Posthumous style: none

Joseph Sadoc Alemany, O.P. (Spanish: José Sadoc Alemany y Conill;; July 3, 1814 – April 14, 1888) was a Spanish Catholic prelate who served as archbishop of San Francisco in California from 1853 to 1884. He previously served as the first bishop of Monterey in California from 1850 to 1853. He was a member of the Dominican Order.

== Early life ==
Joseph Alemany was born in Vic, Catalonia in Spain on July 3, 1814, to Antoni Alemany i Font and Miquela dels Sants Conill i Saborit. Alemany entered the Dominican Order in 1829 at age 15, studying theology at a convent in Vic and the Convent de Sant Domènec de Girona in Girona, Spain. He made his solemn profession of religious vows to the Dominicans in 1831.

In 1834, an outburst of deadly anti-clerical rioting in Spain prompted Reverend Tomasso Cipolletti, the Dominican grandmaster, to offer Alemany and other Dominican seminarians refuge in the Dominican convent in Viterbo, Italy. Alemany began studying at the College of St. Thomas, the future Pontifical University of Saint Thomas Aquinas, where in 1840 he was made Lector in Theology.

=== Priesthood ===
Alemany was ordained a priest for the Dominican Order in Viterbo Cathedral in Viterbo, Italy, on March 11, 1837, by Archbishop Gaspare Bernardo Pianetti. During his studies in Rome, Alemany had an audience with Pope Gregory XVI.

The Dominican superiors sent Alemany to conduct missionary working in the State of Ohio in the United States in 1841. He was transferred to Nashville, Tennessee, in 1842 and then Memphis, Tennessee in 1845. He became a naturalized American citizen that same year. The Dominicans in 1847 appointed him as master of novices in Kentucky in 1847 and then in 1849 as prior provincial for the Dominicans in the American Midwest.

=== Bishop of Monterey ===
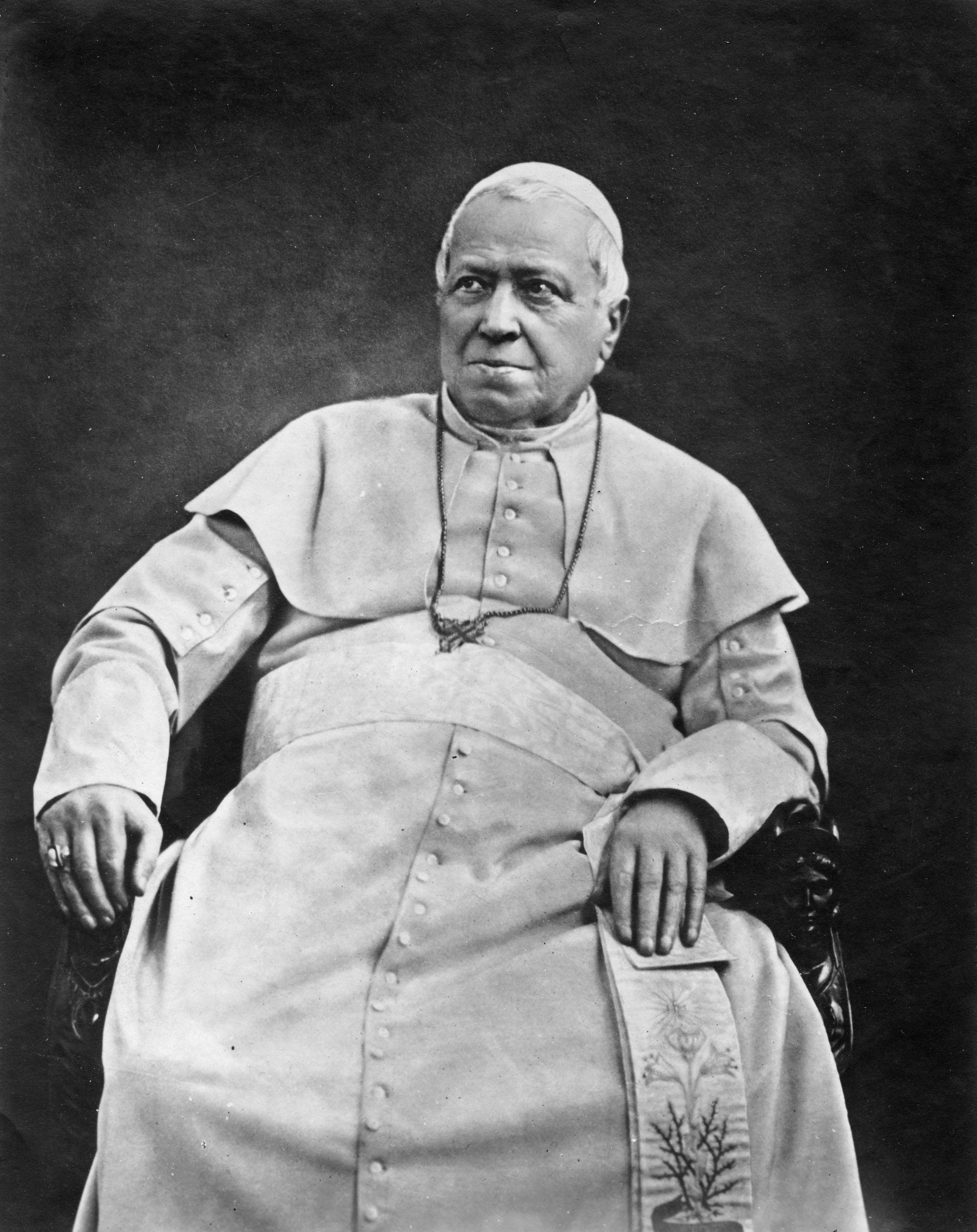
Pope Pius IX (1875)

==== Preparation for departure ====
In 1849, Alemany traveled to Rome to attend a meeting of the general chapter of the Dominicans in Naples, Italy. His abilities as a missionary, plus his fluency in Spanish, had attracted the attention of the papal court at this time. Pope Pius IX appointed Alemany as the first bishop of Monterey on May 31, 1850,

On June 11, while Alemany was still in Rome, Cardinal Giacomo Filippo Fransoni summoned him to a meeting, informing him of his appointment as bishop. Alemany declined it because he had no desire to become a bishop. When Pius IX learned about Alemany's answer, he ordered him to appear in a private audience on June 16. The pope told Alemany, "You must go to California....Where others are drawn by gold, you must carry the Cross." Alemany accepted the appointment and was consecrated by Fransoni as Bishop of Monterey on June 30 in Rome at the Basilica of Sant'Ambrogio e Carlo al Corso. Alemany became the first bishop of California since it became an American territory.

When Alemany became bishop, his new diocese covered California Territory and Utah Territory. During the early 19th century, the Catholic Church owned thousands of acres of land in the Spanish colonies in California. However, the Mexican Government in 1835 expropriated most of that land, redistributing it to private landowners.

As a result of the expropriations, the new diocese of Monterey lacked both money and personnel. During the summer of 1850, Alemany visited England, France and Ireland, trying to raise money and recruit religious sisters. He did not have any success recruiting sisters until he arrived at the Monastery of the Cross in Paris. He found three volunteers at the convent, including Sister Mary Goemaere, a Belgian novice.

Alemany, the sisters, and Reverend Francis Sadoc Vilarassa, another Dominican priest, left Liverpool, England in September 1850 on the SS Columbus for New York City. Alemany made stops in Baltimore, Maryland, Philadelphia, Pennsylvania and Washington D.C. to preach and raise money. He originally planned to send all the sisters to a Dominican convent in Ohio, then decided that Goemaere should accompany him to California. The group finally sailed to the Caribbean oast of what is now Panama, traveled overland by mule and dugout canoe to the Pacific coast, and took a steam ship to California.

==== Arrival in California ====
Alemany, Goemaere and Vila finally arrived in San Francisco in December 1850. After a short time in San Francisco, Alemany traveled to Santa Barbara, California, and then Monterey, California. Vilarassa in 1851 established the province of the Holy Name of Jesus, the first Dominican province in the Western United States.

That same year, Alemany appointed Reverend John Nobili, a Jesuit priest, as pastor of the Santa Clara Mission. Nobili would found the Santa Clara School in Santa Clara, California, for boys in 1851. It later became Santa Clara University. In April 1851, Goemaere opened the Santa Catalina School for girls in Monterey. She established a convent that would become the Dominican Sisters of San Rafael. The Sisters of Notre Dame de Namur founded the Academy of Notre Dame for girls in San Jose, California, in 1851. It later became Notre Dame de Namur University.

In 1853, Alemany filed a petition with the Public Land Commission of the State of California for the return of all expropriated mission lands. He eventually received all the missions, their grounds and cemeteries, along with two large ranchos, or estates:

- Rando Cañada de los Pinos (College Rancho) in Santa Barbara County, comprising 35,499.73 acres (143.6623 km^{2})
- Rancho Laguna in San Luis Obispo County, consisting of 4,157.02 acres (16.8229 km^{2}).

=== San Francisco ===
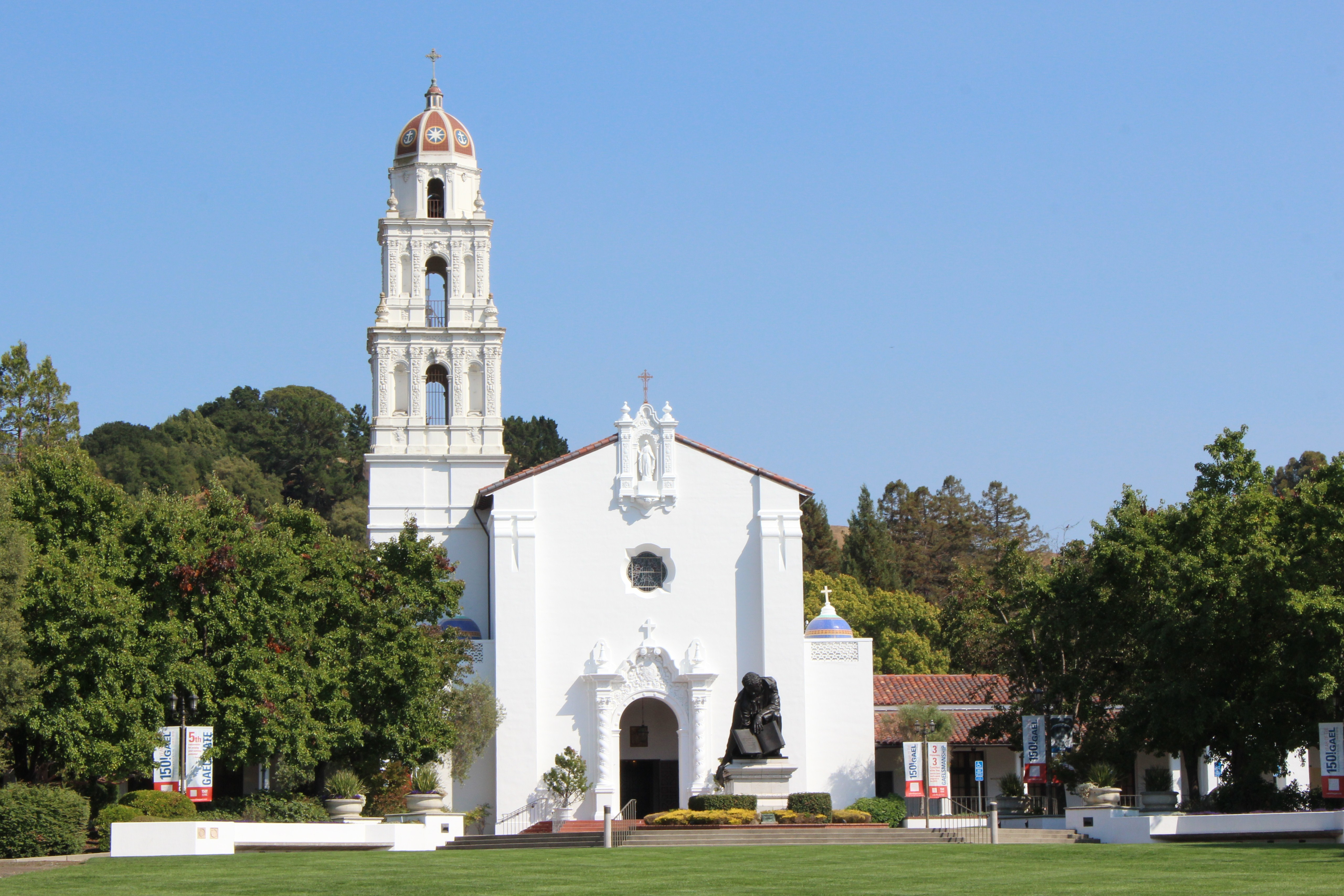
Saint Mary's College of California, Moraga, California (2013)

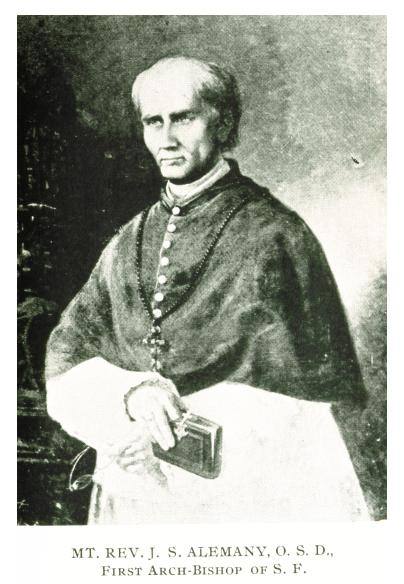
Archbishop Alemany at Santa Clara University (1901)

On July 29, 1853, Pius IX removed Northern California, and Utah Territory from the Diocese of Monterey and established this area as the Archdiocese of San Francisco. He appointed Alemany as its first archbishop. At that time, the archdiocese had only three churches in San Francisco;

- Mission Dolores, established by Spanish missionaries in 1776, used by Spanish-speaking Catholics
- St. Francis of Assisi, erected for Catholic soldiers in 1849
- St. Patrick Church, established for Irish immigrants in 1851

As archbishop of San Francisco, Alemany presided over what became a multinational diocese, owing to the influx of people during the California Gold Rush. He established national parishes for San Francisco's Italian, Irish, French, German and Mexican communities.

In 1855, the Jesuits opened St. Ignatius Academy for boys in San Francisco, It later became the University of San Francisco.

After the start of the American Civil War in April 1861, a division of loyalties emerged in San Francisco between supporters of the secessionist Confederate States of America and those of the federal government. In the summer of 1861, federal supporters started pressuring Alemany to fly the American flag from all the San Francisco churches on Independence Day, July 4. While expressing dismay at the start of the war, Alemany refused to fly the flags.

Alemany in 1862 founded Saint Mary's College in Moraga, California, for the education of the children of working people. He turned the operation of the college over to De La Salle Brothers in 1868.

In October 1866, Alemany attended the Second Plenary Council of Baltimore, a meeting of the bishops and archbishops of the United States in Baltimore, Maryland. The Sisters of the Holy Names of Jesus and Mary founded Holy Name University for girls in Oakland, California, in 1868.

The Dominican Sisters of Mission San Jose were established in the archdiocese in 1876.In 1883, at Alemany's request, Pope Leo XIII appointed Reverend Patrick Riordan as coadjutor archbishop to assist Alemany

== Later life ==
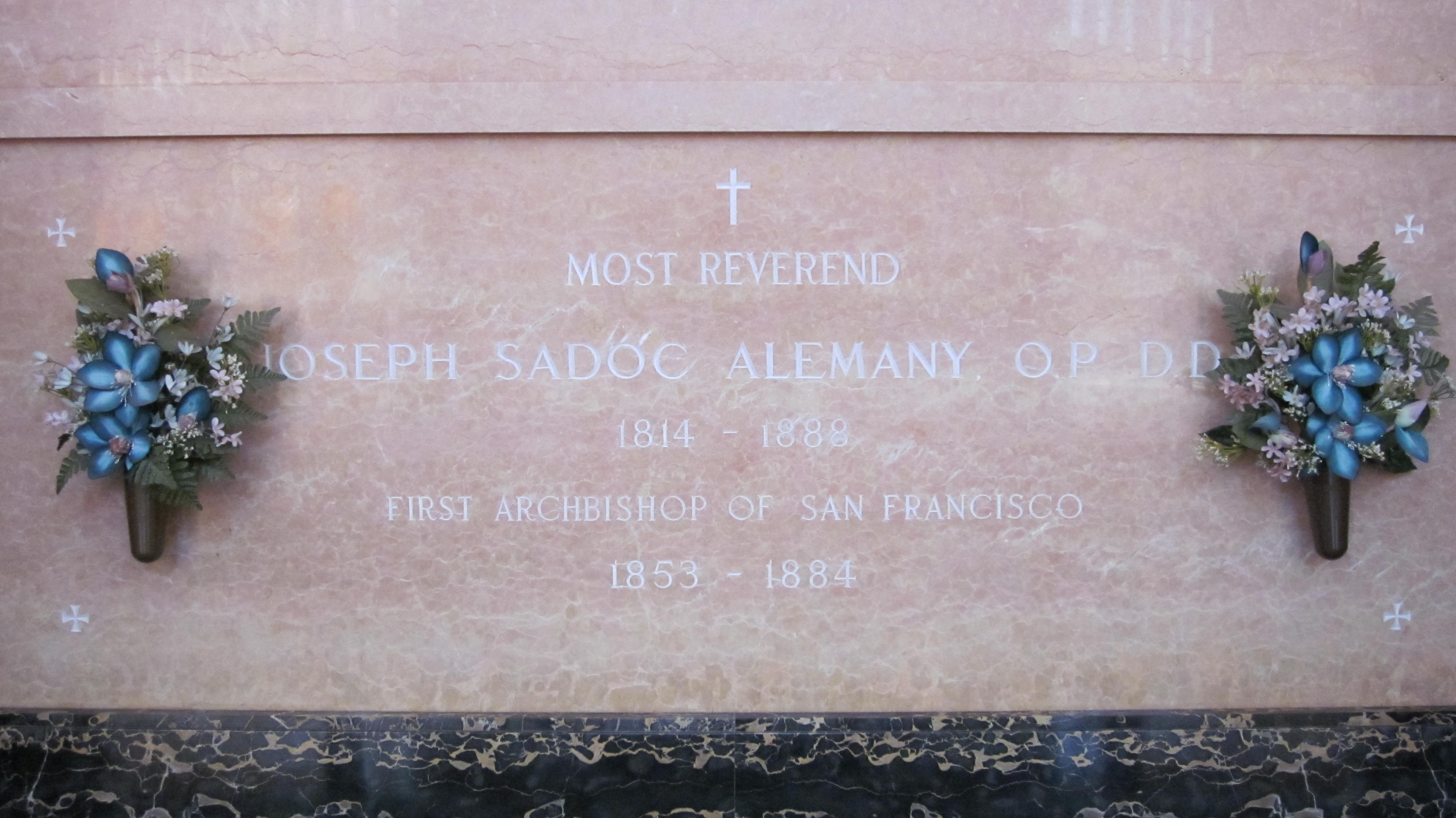
Alemany's tomb at Holy Cross Cemetery in Colma, California (2010)

Leo XIII accepted Alemany resignation as archbishop of San Francisco in early 1885. He then left San Francisco for New York City in early 1885. While in New York, he was introduced by William Rosecrans, a former congressman from California, to US President Grover Cleveland. After traveling in Rome, Alemany was granted an audience with Leo XIII, who appointed him as titular archbishop of Pelusium on March 20, 1885.

Alemany's final destination was the Convent of Santo Domingo in Valencia, Spain. He spent the rest of his life working to rehabilitate the Dominican order in Spain. Alemany died at the convent on April 14, 1888. He was buried in the Church of Sant Domènec in Vic.

In 1965, the Archdiocese of San Francisco brought Alemany's remains back to California. Archbishop Joseph T. McGucken celebrated a requiem mass for him at the Old Cathedral of Saint Mary of the Immaculate Conception. His remains were re-interred in the Archbishops' Crypt in the mausoleum in Holy Cross Cemetery in Colma, California.

The following places were named in honor of Alemany:

- Alemany Boulevard in San Francisco
- Alemany Maze, a freeway interchange, in San Francisco
- Bishop Alemany High School in Mission Hills, California
- Archbishop Alemany Library at Dominican University of California in San Rafael, California

== Publications ==
The Life of St. Dominick And A Sketch Of The Dominican Order.

Catholic Church titles
Preceded by Francisco Garcia Diego y Moreno, O.F.M. (as Bishop of Both Californias)	Bishop of Monterey; 1850–1853	Succeeded by Thaddeus Amat y Brusi, C.M.
Preceded by None (erected)	Archbishop of San Francisco; 1853–1884	Succeeded by Patrick William Riordan
