= Dominican Sisters of San Rafael =

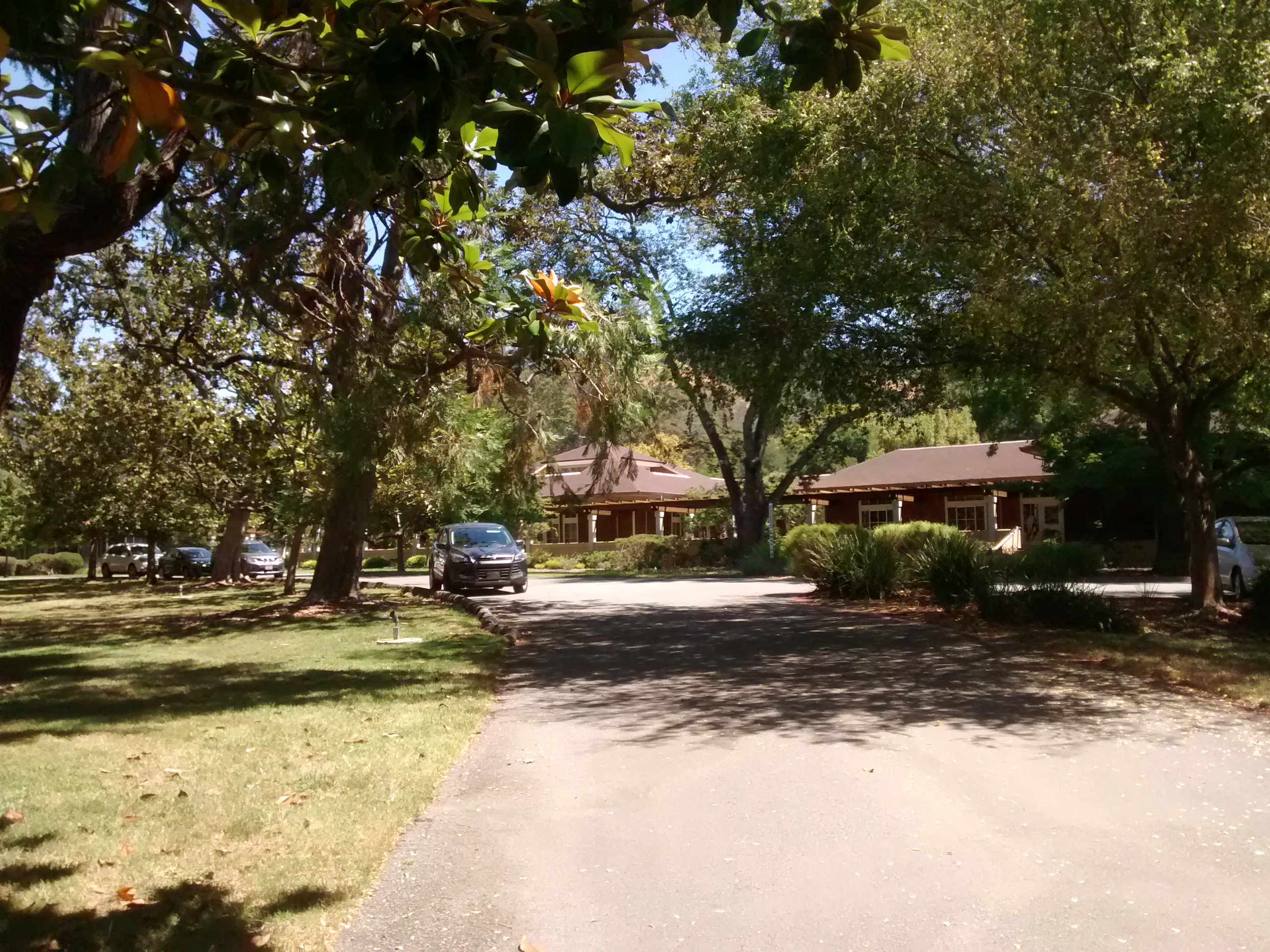
Dominican Sisters Center

The Dominican Congregation of the Most Holy Name of Jesus, better known as the Dominican Sisters of San Rafael, is an institute of religious sisters belonging to the Third Order of St. Dominic founded in California in 1850 to teach the children of the new American territory. They also operate health facilities. They are located in San Rafael, California.

== History ==
=== Foundations ===
When the California Republic became an American territory in 1848, the Holy See, under Pope Pius IX, followed Vatican practice and split the Diocese of California, which had covered Alta California, between the United States and Mexico. Its seat was moved from San Diego to Monterey, with its name changed to the Diocese of Monterey. A new bishop was needed to lead it, and in May 1850 the choice fell upon a Spanish-born Dominican friar, Joseph Sadoc Alemany, who had established his Order in the United States and had become a citizen of the nation. He happened to be in Rome for a meeting of the friars there when he received word of his appointment, which he accepted only under obedience to the pope. He received consecration as a bishop the following month.

As he prepared for his new post on the edge of the American frontier, Alemany determined that he would need a community of religious women helping to build up his new diocese through teaching its children. In preparation for this he traveled around Europe, in the course of which he approached various Dominican monasteries of nuns. When he arrived in Paris, France, he went to the Monastery of the Cross. There he presented his request for volunteers from the community. He received only one, Mary of the Cross Goemaere (1809–1891), a Belgian novice.

Goemaere set sail with Alemany and another friar for San Francisco, where they landed on 6 December. The following spring, she moved to Monterey, where she opened St. Catherine Academy, the first private, Catholic school in the State, as well as the first religious community of women, of which she was the prioress. Within three years, a community of nine nuns had developed, with women from Mexico and Spain, as well as three local women. The latter group included a prominent member of California society, Concepción Argüello, who was to become noted in folk legend due to a failed love affair in her youth.

The diocese was divided by the Holy See in 1853, with Alemany being transferred to serve as the head of the new Archdiocese of San Francisco. At the same time, the City of Benicia, was established as the capital of the new state. The following year Goemaere made the decision to move the community to Benicia, due to having lost the patronage of Alemany and since that city seemed to offer more potential for the growth of both the community and the school.

=== Expansion ===
By 1862 the community had grown large enough that Goemaere founded a new school, St. Rose Academy in San Francisco. (This school operated until 1989, when its facilities were irreparably damaged by the Loma Prieta earthquake). She also opened Mount St. Mary's Academy in Reno, Nevada in 1877.

In 1887 Mother Louis O'Donnell was elected the second prioress of the congregation. She was to lead the Sisters until 1929 and was responsible for moving the motherhouse and novitiate from Benicia to San Rafael in 1889. St. Catherine's Academy moved there in 1894. Under her tenure, new schools were established in California and Nevada. She also expanded the congregation's service into healthcare with the opening of St. Joseph's Home in Stockton, California, now St. Joseph's Medical Center (1899) and St. Mary's Hospital in Reno (1912).

With the support of the University of California, Berkeley, a junior college was opened in 1915, and two years later, it became a four-year college, the Dominican College of San Rafael, the first Catholic college in California to grant the bachelor's degree to women. In 1924, the California State Board of Education authorized the college to recommend candidates for public school teaching credentials, thus enabling Dominican students to teach in public schools in California on both the elementary and secondary levels. In 2000, the college became the Dominican University of California.

== Current status ==
Under the reforms of Catholic institutional life by the Second Vatican Council which opened in 1965, the Dominican Sisters of San Rafael expanded into new forms of serving the needy and to a commitment for working for justice in the world. They now operate the Santa Sabina Retreat Center on the grounds of the motherhouse. That same year of 1965 the congregation saw its peak in membership, with a total of 376 Sisters. Today (2015) they number around 100.

== See also ==
- List of Catholic religious institutes
