= La Palma, California =

City in California, United States

- City
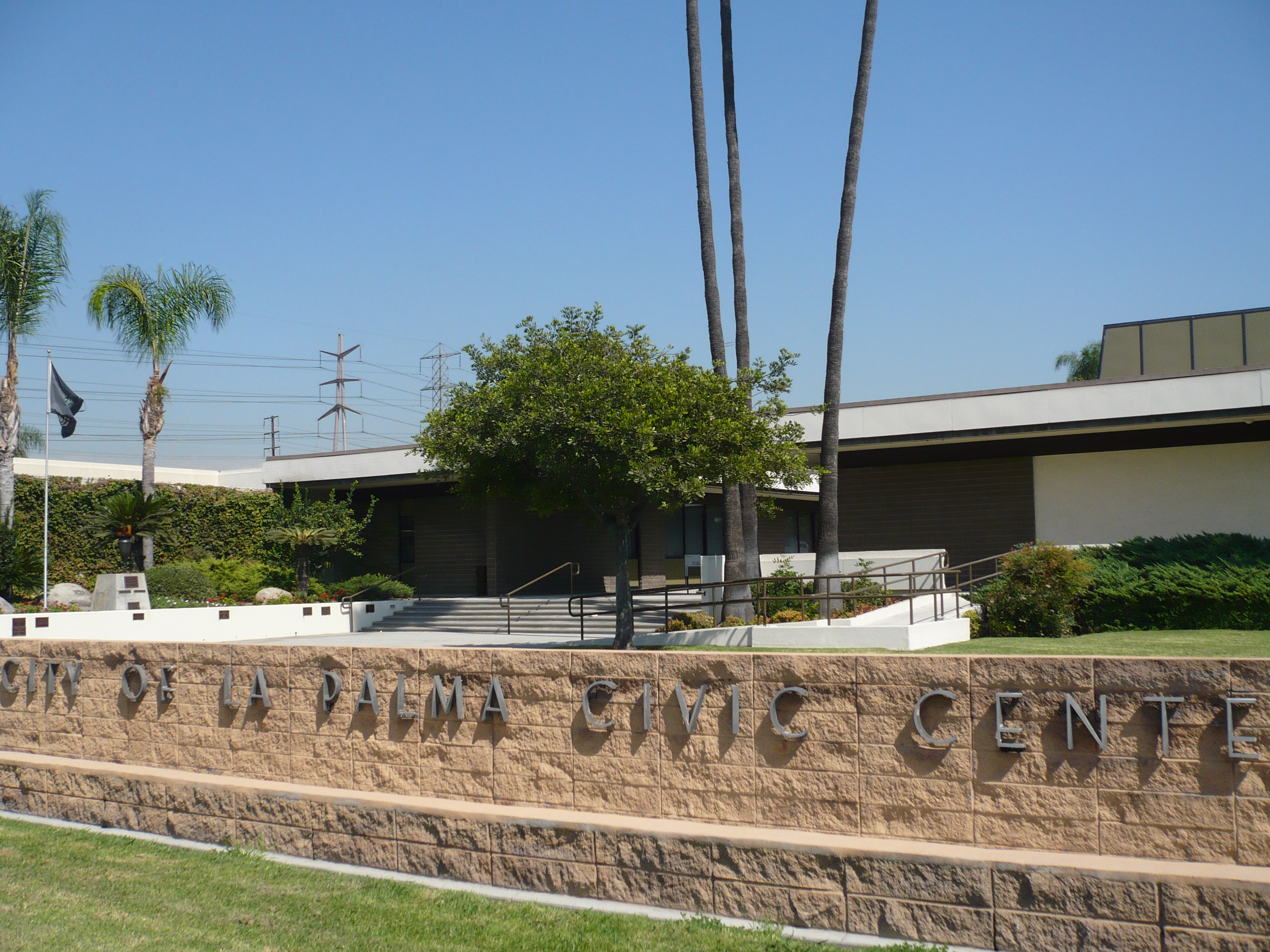
- La Palma Civic Center

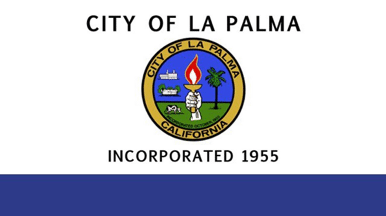
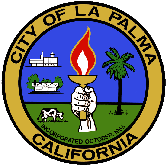
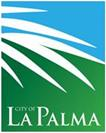
- Flag Seal
- Motto(s): "Where Tradition and Vision Come Together"
- Interactive map of La Palma, California
- Location in the United States
- Coordinates: 33°50′58″N 118°2′38″W
- Country: United States
- State: California
- County: Orange
- Incorporated: October 26, 1955

Government
  - Type: Council-Manager
  - Mayor: Mark I. Waldman
  - Mayor Pro Tem: Nitesh P. Patel
  - City Council: Debbie S. Baker; Janet Keo Conklin; Vikesh P. Patel
  - City Manager: Michael Egan (interim)

Area
  - Total: 1.80 sq mi (4.67 km^{2})
  - Land: 1.78 sq mi (4.61 km^{2})
  - Water: 0.023 sq mi (0.06 km^{2}) 1.32%
- Elevation: 46 ft (14 m)

Population (2020)
  - Total: 15,581
  - Density: 8,753.7/sq mi (3,379.83/km^{2})
- Time zone: UTC-8 (PST)
  - Summer (DST): UTC-7 (PDT)
- ZIP code: 90623
- Area code: 562/714/657
- FIPS code: 06-40256
- GNIS feature ID: 1652737
- Website: www.lapalmaca.gov

La Palma (luh PAHL-muh; Spanish for "the palm") is a city in northern Orange County, California, United States. The population was 15,581 at the 2020 census, up from 15,568 at the 2010 census.

== History ==
La Palma was incorporated on October 26, 1955. It was originally incorporated as Dairyland, and was one of three dairy cities in the region (the other two being Dairy Valley, now Cerritos, and Dairy City, now Cypress) but when the dairies moved east in 1965, the name of the community was changed to La Palma, after the region's Spanish heritage and its main thoroughfare, La Palma Avenue.

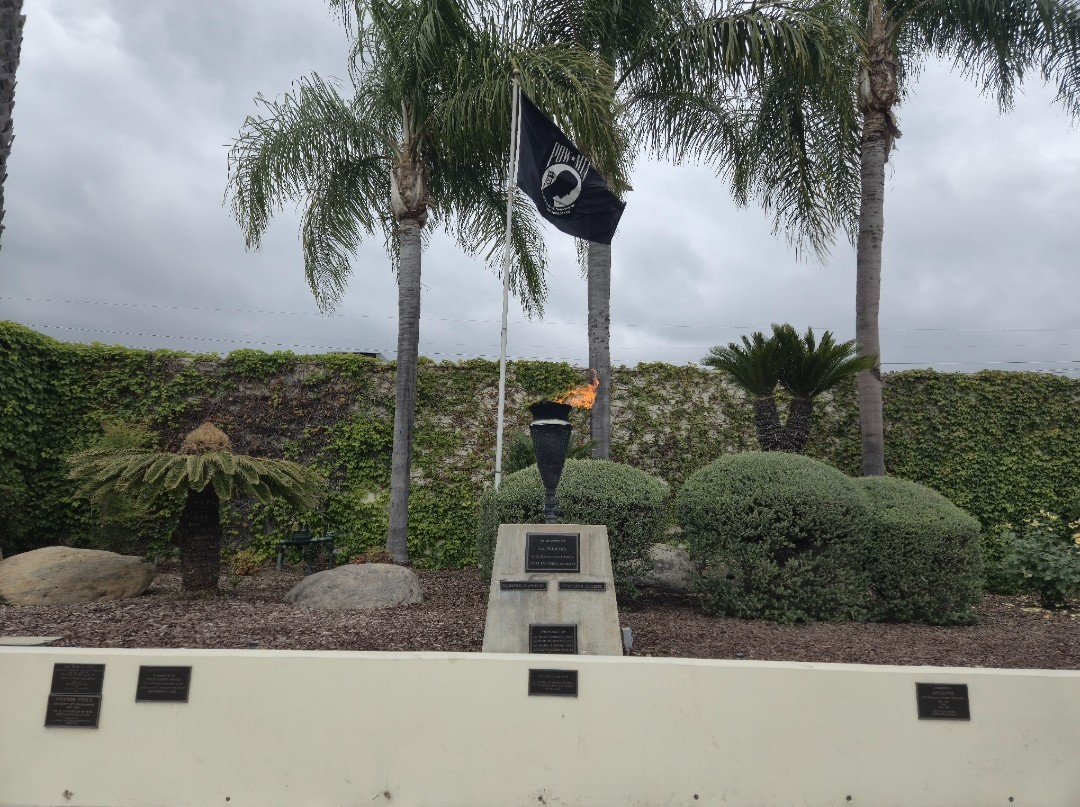
Eternal Flame Veteran Memorial in La Palma.

== Geography ==
According to the United States Census Bureau, the city has a total area of 1.8 square miles (4.7 km^{2}), of which 1.78 square miles (4.6 km^{2}) is land and 0.02 square miles (0.052 km^{2}) (1.32%) is water. The size makes it the smallest city in Orange County in terms of area.

=== Biogeography ===
The most common native species: Hairy Sand Verbena, Red Sand Verbena, and Pink Sand Verbena.

La Palma

Climate chart (precipitation, max. and min. temperature)
J	F	M	A	M	J	J	A	S	O	N	D
1 83 58	1 83 58	1.3 72 60	0.7 84 61	0.1 75 63	0 95 71	0 91 71	0 94 70	0 109 76	0 87 64	0 78 57	0 82 57
- █ Average max. and min. temperatures in °F
- █ Precipitation totals in inches
- Source: Weather Underground
Metric conversion
J	F	M	A	M	J	J	A	S	O	N	D
25 28 14	25 28 14	34 22 16	18 29 16	2.5 24 17	0 35 22	0 33 22	0 34 21	0 43 24	0 31 18	0 26 14	1 28 14
- █ Average max. and min. temperatures in °C
- █ Precipitation totals in mm

== Demographics ==
Historical population
Census	Pop.	Note	%±
1960	622		—
1970	9,687		1,457.4%
1980	15,399		59.0%
1990	15,392		0.0%
2000	15,408		0.1%
2010	15,568		1.0%
2020	15,581		0.1%
U.S. Decennial Census; 1860–1870 1880–1890; 1900 1910 1920; 1930 1940 1950; 1960 1970 1980; 1990 2000 2010; 2020

La Palma was first listed as a city in the 1970 U.S. census. Prior to that, the area was part of unincorporated Anaheim Township.

=== Racial and ethnic composition ===
La Palma, California – Racial and ethnic composition Note: The US Census treats Hispanic/Latino as an ethnic category. This table excludes Latinos from the racial categories and assigns them to a separate category. Hispanics/Latinos may be of any race.
Race / Ethnicity (NH = Non-Hispanic)	Pop 1980	Pop 1990	Pop 2000	Pop 2010	Pop 2020	% 1980	% 1990	% 2000	% 2010	% 2020
White alone (NH)	11,066	8,119	5,592	4,329	3,324	71.86%	52.75%	36.29%	27.81%	21.33%
Black or African American alone (NH)	381	633	696	773	766	2.47%	4.11%	4.52%	4.97%	4.92%
Native American or Alaska Native alone (NH)	128	37	37	26	18	0.83%	0.24%	0.24%	0.17%	0.12%
Asian alone (NH)	2,028	4,699	6,874	7,432	7,835	13.17%	30.53%	44.61%	47.74%	50.29%
Native Hawaiian or Pacific Islander alone (NH)	2,028	4,699	43	36	77	13.17%	30.53%	0.28%	0.23%	0.49%
Other race alone (NH)	14	32	35	43	54	0.09%	0.21%	0.23%	0.28%	0.35%
Mixed race or Multiracial (NH)	x	x	395	442	568	x	x	2.56%	2.84%	3.65%
Hispanic or Latino (any race)	1,782	1,872	1,736	2,487	2,939	11.57%	12.16%	11.27%	15.98%	18.86%
Total	15,399	15,392	15,408	15,568	15,581	100.00%	100.00%	100.00%	100.00%	100.00%

=== 2020 census ===
As of the 2020 census, La Palma had a population of 15,581. The population density was 8,748.5 inhabitants per square mile (3,377.8/km^{2}). The racial makeup of La Palma was 25.2% White, 5.1% African American, 0.6% Native American, 50.8% Asian, 0.6% Pacific Islander, 7.5% from other races, and 10.3% from two or more races. Hispanic or Latino of any race were 18.9% of the population.

The census reported that 99.8% of the population lived in households, 0.2% lived in non-institutionalized group quarters, and no one was institutionalized. There were 5,160 households, of which 34.1% had children under the age of 18 living in them. Of all households, 61.4% were married-couple households, 3.3% were cohabiting couple households, 23.3% had a female householder with no spouse or partner present, and 12.0% had a male householder with no spouse or partner present. About 15.4% of all households were made up of individuals, and 9.1% had someone living alone who was 65 years of age or older. The average household size was 3.01. There were 4,156 families (80.5% of all households).

The age distribution was 18.8% under the age of 18, 8.4% aged 18 to 24, 24.1% aged 25 to 44, 28.4% aged 45 to 64, and 20.4% who were 65 years of age or older. The median age was 44.1 years. For every 100 females, there were 93.0 males, and for every 100 females age 18 and over there were 91.1 males age 18 and over.

There were 5,270 housing units at an average density of 2,959.0 units per square mile (1,142.5 units/km^{2}), of which 5,160 (97.9%) were occupied. Of the occupied units, 68.0% were owner-occupied and 32.0% were occupied by renters. The homeowner vacancy rate was 0.2% and the rental vacancy rate was 2.9%. 100.0% of residents lived in urban areas, while 0.0% lived in rural areas.

=== 2023 ACS 5-year estimates ===
In 2023, the US Census Bureau estimated that the median household income was $115,833, and the per capita income was $53,050. About 3.6% of families and 5.3% of the population were below the poverty line.

=== 2010 census ===
The 2010 US Census reported that La Palma had a population of 15,568. The population density was 8,499.1 inhabitants per square mile (3,281.5/km^{2}). The racial makeup of La Palma was 5,762 (37.0%) White (27.8% Non-Hispanic White), 802 (5.2%) African American, 56 (0.4%) Native American, 7,483 (48.1%) Asian, 41 (0.3%) Pacific Islander, 760 (4.9%) from other races, and 664 (4.3%) from two or more races. Hispanic or Latino of any race were 2,487 persons (16.0%).

The census reported that 15,548 people (99.9% of the population) lived in households, 14 (0.1%) lived in non-institutionalized group quarters, and 6 (0%) were institutionalized.

There were 5,080 households, 1,949 (38.4%) had children under the age of 18 living in them, 3,331 (65.6%) were opposite-sex married couples living together, 641 (12.6%) had a female householder with no husband present, 240 (4.7%) had a male householder with no wife present. There were 134 (2.6%) unmarried opposite-sex partnerships, and 26 (0.5%) same-sex married couples or partnerships. 716 households (14.1%) were one person and 389 (7.7%) had someone living alone who was 65 or older. The average household size was 3.06. There were 4,212 families (82.9% of households); the average family size was 3.37.

The age distribution was 3,423 people (22.0%) under the age of 18, 1,418 people (9.1%) aged 18 to 24, 3,805 people (24.4%) aged 25 to 44, 4,445 people (28.6%) aged 45 to 64, and 2,477 people (15.9%) who were 65 or older. The median age was 41.2 years. For every 100 females, there were 93.5 males. For every 100 females age 18 and over, there were 90.7 males.

There were 5,224 housing units at an average density of 2,852.0 per square mile, of the occupied units 3,648 (71.8%) were owner-occupied and 1,432 (28.2%) were rented. The homeowner vacancy rate was 0.3%; the rental vacancy rate was 6.0%. 11,315 people (72.7% of the population) lived in owner-occupied housing units and 4,233 people (27.2%) lived in rental housing units.

According to the 2010 United States Census, La Palma had a median household income of $87,289, with 7.2% of the population living below the federal poverty line.

== Economy ==
=== Top employers ===
According to La Palma's 2023 Annual Comprehensive Financial Report, the top employers in the city are:

#	Employer	# of Employees
1	ADP	565
2	La Palma Intercommunity Hospital	395
3	Applecare Medical Group	278
4	Arcadia	179
5	Beacon Day School	147
6	Tech Knowledge Associates LLC	93
7	Walmart Stores	92
8	Quiet Logistics	87
9	Sunrise Assisted Living	78
10	CJ Foods USA	75

== Government ==
The mayor is Nitesh P. Patel.

According to the Orange County Registrar of Voters, as of May 15, 2025, La Palma has 10,076 registered voters. Of those, 2,998 (35.87%) are registered Democrats, 2,637 (31.55%) are registered Republicans, and 2,446 (29.27%) have declined to state a political party/are independents.

=== Federal, state, and county representation ===
In the United States House of Representatives, La Palma is in California's 45th congressional district, represented by Democrat Derek Tran since 2025.

In the California State Senate, La Palma resides within California's 36th senatorial district, represented by Republican Tony Strickland since 2025.

In the California State Assembly, La Palma resides within California's 67th State Assembly district, represented by Democrat Sharon Quirk-Silva since 2016.

For the Orange County Board of Supervisors, La Palma resides within the 1st district, represented by Janet Nguyen since 2024.

== Education ==
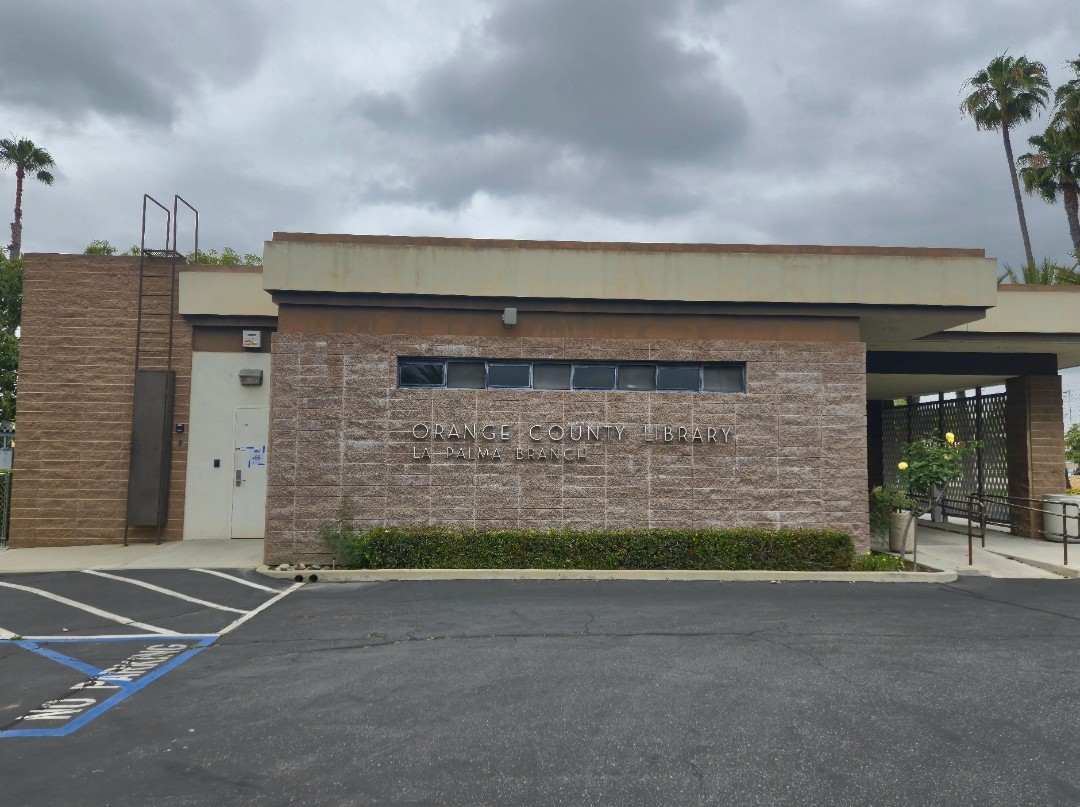
La Palma Branch of Orange County Library

Portions of La Palma are in the Centralia Elementary School District, the Cypress Elementary School District, and the Buena Park Elementary School District. Residents of the former two school districts are within the Anaheim Union High School District. Residents of the Buena Park district are in the Fullerton Joint Union High School District.

Schools in the La Palma city limits:

- Los Coyotes Elementary: Centralia Elementary School District
- G.B. Miller Elementary: Centralia Elementary School District
- Steve Luther Elementary: Cypress School District
- Walker Junior High School: Anaheim Union High School District
- John F. Kennedy High School: Anaheim Union High School District
- Beacon Day School for Children with Autism and Related Disorders: Private

Walker and Kennedy are the zoned middle and high school, respectively, for sections of La Palma in the Anaheim UHSD.

Orange County Library operates the La Palma Branch.

== Infrastructure ==
Los Cerritos Community News serves the city.

=== Transportation ===
Orange County Transportation Authority operates three bus routes in La Palma.

=== Emergency services ===
Fire protection in La Palma is provided by the Orange County Fire Authority with ambulance transport by Care Ambulance Service. The La Palma Police Department provides law enforcement services.

=== Health care ===
La Palma is served by one health care facility:

- La Palma Intercommunity Hospital (Hospital)

=== Water services ===
Water in La Palma is supplied by the City of La Palma Public Works & Community Services Department, which sources its water from the Metropolitan Water District of Southern California. This water is imported from both Northern California and the Colorado River. Additionally, groundwater is supplied by Orange County Water District, sourced by an underground aquifer that replenishes from the Santa Ana River, local rainfall, and imported water.

=== Crime ===
The Uniform Crime Report (UCR), collected annually by the FBI, compiles police statistics from local and state law enforcement agencies across the nation. The UCR records Part I and Part II crimes. Part I crimes become known to law enforcement and are considered the most serious crimes including homicide, rape, robbery, aggravated assault, burglary, larceny, motor vehicle theft, and arson. Part II crimes only include arrest data. The 2023 UCR Data for La Palma is listed below:

2023 UCR Data
	Aggravated Assault	Homicide	Rape	Robbery	Burglary	Larceny Theft	Motor Vehicle Theft	Arson
La Palma	11	0	1	4	39	229	58	2

== Media ==
KMPC (Radio Korea) has its offices in La Palma. It moved there from Koreatown, Los Angeles in 2025.

== Notable people ==
- Hugo Arellano (born 1998) – soccer player
- Nathan Baesel (born 1974) – actor
- Ami Bera (born 1965) – U.S. representative for California
- Derrick Deese Jr. (born 1998) – National Football League (NFL) player
- John Lamb (born 1990) – Major League Baseball (MLB) player
- Steve Rotter (born 1998) – volleyball player
