= Montclair Hospital Medical Center =

Coordinates: 34.079°N 117.696°W

- Prime Healthcare Services, Inc.

Geography
- Location: Montclair, California, United States

Organization
- Care system: Private
- Type: Community
- Affiliated university: None

Services
- Beds: 102

History
- Opened: 1973

Links
- Website: http://www.montclair-hospital.com/
- Lists: Hospitals in California

Montclair Hospital Medical Center (MHMC) is a 102-bed acute care facility in Montclair, in the Pomona Valley of San Bernardino County, southern California.

MHMC is owned and operated by Prime Healthcare Services, Inc. (PHS), a hospital management company located in Ontario. PHS was founded in 2001 by Prem Reddy, who is its chairman of the board. PHS purchased the facility from AHMC Healthcare in 2006.

== Services ==
- 24-hour basic emergency
- Cardio-neuro
- Cardiovascular Lab
- Imaging services - Digital Filmless Radiology
- Clinical lab
- Critical care/Stepdown Unit
- Surgical services
- Pharmacy
- Outpatient Physical Therapy
- Bio-Medical
- Women's Care - Centers of Excellence

== History ==
MHMC was founded in 1973 as Doctors Hospital- Montclair and operated by National Medical Enterprises, a predecessor of Tenet Healthcare, for several years before being sold in early 1995. In 2001, the facility changed ownership again when it was purchased by AHMC. In 2006, AHMC divested MHMC to Prime Healthcare who operates the facility as Montclair Hospital Medical Center.

== Awards and recognitions ==
- AstraZeneca Spirit of Humanity Award (2006) for providing medical assistance to children and adults without medical insurance
- Accreditation by JACHO

== See also ==
- Prime Healthcare Services
- List of hospitals in California
