= Catherine Goemaere =

Belgian Catholic religious sister

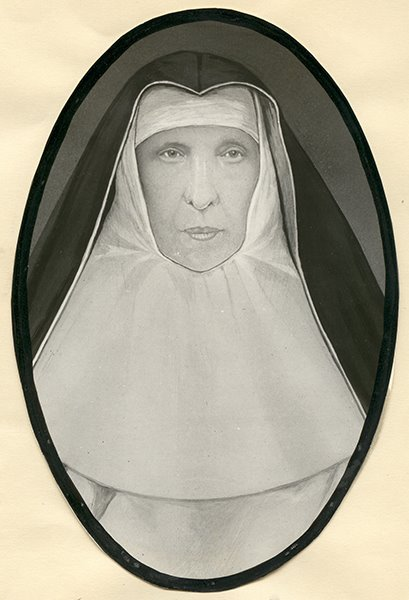
- Portrait of Catherine Goemaere

Catherine Goemaere, also known as Sister Mary of the Cross, (born 20 March 1809 in Warneton - died 3 October 1891 in Benicia) was a Belgian Catholic religious sister, missionary in Alta California, and founder of the Dominican Sisters of San Rafael.

== Biography ==
Catherine Adélaïde Goemaere was born on 20 March 1809 into an artisan family in Warneton. She was the daughter of Ignace Joseph Goemaere, a cooper, and Thersille Euphémie Perpétue Demaillye, a merchant. She grew up in a family of nine children marked by high infant mortality. In 1821, at the age of twelve, she lost her mother; only her sisters Elise and Delphine survived to adulthood. Little is known about her life prior to religious life. According to Patricia Dougherty, the quality of her writing and administrative knowledge suggests that she had experience managing business and accounting before becoming a religious sister.

In September 1849, during the July Monarchy, she received the Dominican habit and became a member of the Daughters of the Cross under the name Sister Mary of the Cross at the Convent of the Daughters of the Cross in Paris, reoccupied since 1817.. At the time of her reception she was described as "tested by life". Her first year was marked by the arrival of Joseph Sadoc Alemany, recently consecrated bishop of the newly created Diocese of Monterey.

She volunteered to accompany him and left Paris on 11 October 1850, believing she was being sent to teach French in Somerset, Ohio. After crossing the Atlantic and arriving in New York City, the bishop informed her that he preferred that she accompany him to Alta California. She agreed and travelled with him and Father Sadoc Vilarrasa via the Panama Canal to San Francisco. She arrived on 7 December 1850 and settled three months later in Monterey.

There she founded a Dominican convent composed of two Californios and two American women, and established a school called the Convent of Saint Catherine of Siena, which had 82 students by the summer of 1854. In 1854, when Benicia became the new capital of California, the bishop transferred the convent there, where it took the anglicized name Saint Catherine's Academy.. The complex expanded into several structures: convent, novitiate, school, and hospital.

In 1862, after maintaining correspondence with Alexandre Vincent Jandel, he asked her to reconsider joining the Dominican congregation in Canada, but she declined. That same year she founded St Rose Academy in San Francisco. In 1877, as her order expanded, St Mary's Academy opened in Reno.

However, development of the Benicia headquarters proved costly, leading to recurring financial difficulties with debts exceeding $32,000. These debts were partly due to disagreements between Catherine Goemaere and Archbishop Alemany, as well as the limited local resources available. For these reasons, and unable to repay the archbishop, the community decided to relocate to San Rafael. Catherine Goemaere remained in Benicia after renouncing the position of Mother Superior. Only the oldest sisters remained with her.

She died on 3 October 1891 in Benicia. Dominican delegations from San Rafael, Stockton, and St. Vincent's School for Boys attended her funeral. Her grave remains visible today in the congregation cemetery. At the time of her death, the congregation she founded counted 67 sisters teaching in seven schools in Benicia, San Francisco, San Rafael, Vallejo, Stockton, and San Leandro, as well as two hospitals.

== Legacy ==
The Dominican Sisters of San Rafael, the present-day name of the community she founded, regularly commemorate their founder, notably celebrating the 175th anniversary of the foundation in 2025. A commemorative plaque dedicated to her was unveiled on 21 August 1954.
