= Arrowhead Regional Medical Center =

Coordinates: 34.0739°N 117.3511°W

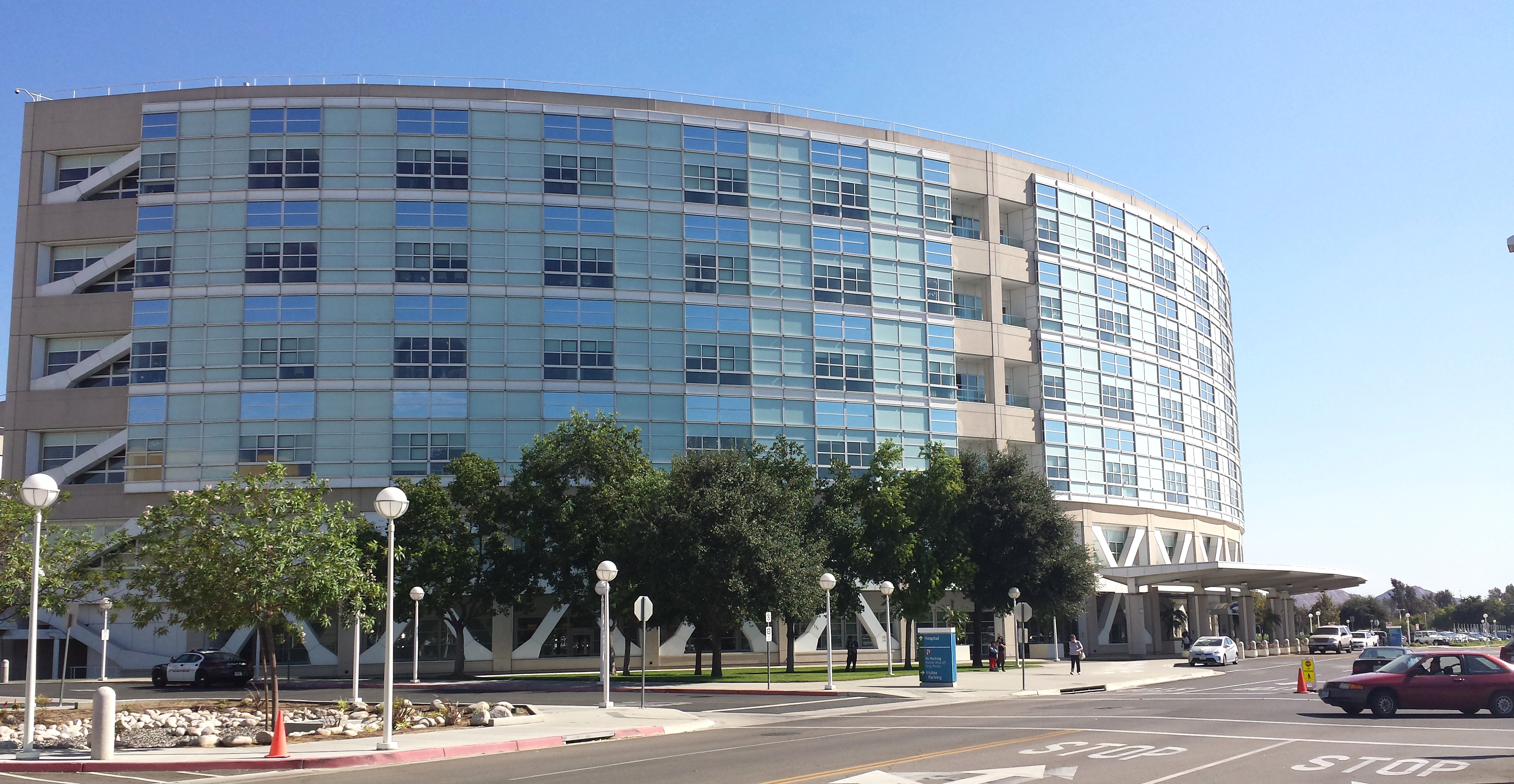
- The hospital in October, 2013.

Geography
- Location: 400 North Pepper Avenue, 92324-1819, Colton, California, United States

Organisation
- Care system: Private, Medicaid, Medicare
- Type: Teaching
- Affiliated university: California University of Science and Medicine, California State University, San Bernardino, University of California, Irvine, Western University of Health Sciences, Loma Linda University, Crafton Hills College, Touro University California

Services
- Emergency department: Level I Trauma Center
- Beds: 456

History
- Founded: 1999

Links
- Website: www.arrowheadregional.org

Arrowhead Regional Medical Center (ARMC) is a teaching hospital located 7 miles southwest of Downtown San Bernardino in Colton, California, within Southern California's Inland Empire. ARMC is owned and operated by the County of San Bernardino. The emergency department (ED) at ARMC is the second busiest ED in the state of California. The hospital operates ten different residency training programs.

In the most recent year with available data, the hospital had 24,441 admissions, performed 6,483 inpatient and 5,367 outpatient surgeries, and 254,000 outpatient visits. Arrowhead Regional Medical Center is accredited by the American Osteopathic Association's Healthcare Facilities Accreditation Program, the Centers for Medicare and Medicaid Services, and is certified by the American College of Surgeons as a Level I trauma center.

== Services ==
ARMC is a comprehensive stroke center, and was the first primary stroke center in San Bernardino County. The emergency department (ED) at ARMC has more than 130,461 visits annually, making it the second busiest ED in the state of California. The hospital provides the only burn center for San Bernardino, Riverside, Inyo, and Mono counties. Image Guided Intensity Modulated Radiation Therapy is offered as part of the Medical Imaging Department.

- General Medical and Surgical Care
- Medical, Surgical, and Burn Intensive Care
- Cardiology
- Emergency Department
- Family Medicine/Satellite Clinics
- General Radiology
- Interventional Radiology
- Neonatal Intensive Care Unit
- Neurology
- Obstetrics
- Orthopedics
- Pediatric Medical and Surgical care
- Psychiatry
- Trauma Center

== Facility ==
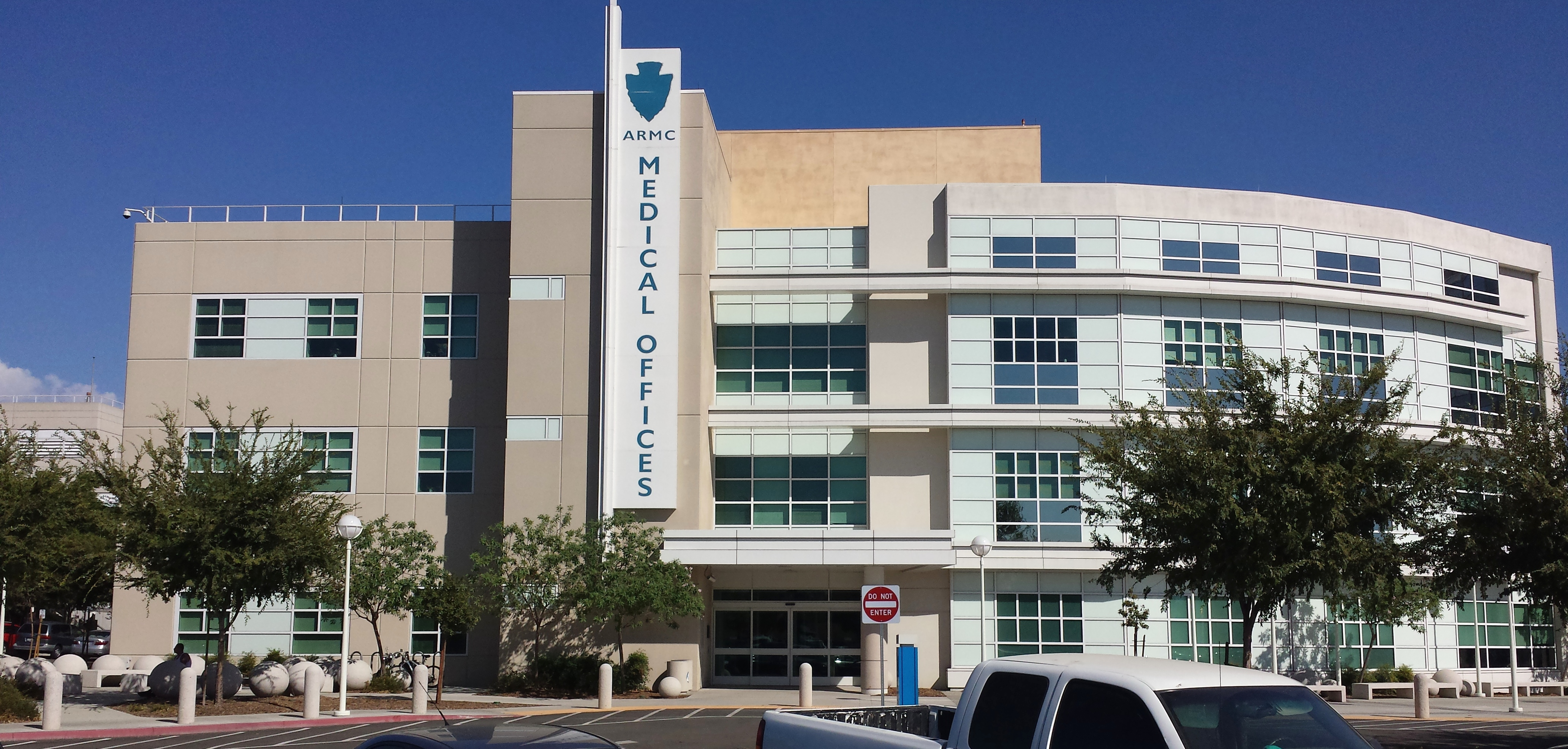
The medical office building of Arrowhead Regional Medical Center.

ARMC is a 456-bed county hospital. 90 of the total 456 hospital beds are behavioral health and 366 are hospital inpatient beds. The hospital building is located nine miles from the San Andreas and two miles from the San Jacinto active fault lines, the new center is designed to remain self-sufficient for a minimum of three days after an 8.3 magnitude earthquake. The facility uses a combination of elastomeric base isolators and hydraulic viscous dampers (similar to those used in an MX missile silo) to absorb the energy generated during a seismic event and to protect the building's structural integrity.

The emergency department is a level I trauma center and consists of 15 observation rooms, 8 treatment rooms, 8 trauma rooms, and 3 law enforcement rooms. The hospital has a helicopter landing area, which is equipped to accommodate medivac and military helicopters. There is an outpatient building on the ARMC campus, which houses 109 examination rooms and 8 procedure rooms.

The Arrowhead Regional Medical Center is the first facility in the U.S. to use filmless radiology hospital-wide. This system makes digital images, which are instantly available for viewing at multiple stations throughout the facility for faster and more accurate diagnosis.

== Graduate medical education ==
ARMC operates seven ACGME accredited residency programs that train newly graduated physicians in specialties such as family medicine, emergency medicine, surgery, radiology, obstetrics and gynecology, internal medicine, and psychiatry. Additionally there are four ACGME accredited fellowships in Emergency Medical Services, Maternal–fetal medicine, Pulmonary Critical Care Medicine and Surgical Critical Care.

ARMC is the primary teaching hospital for the California University of Science and Medicine, School of Medicine, located adjacent to the hospital grounds.
