= California University of Science and Medicine =

Private medical school in California, US

- Other names: CUSM; CalMed
- Type: Private medical school
- Established: 2015
- Dean: Paul Lyons, MD
- Location: Colton, California, United States; 34.0772°N 117.3509°W
- Website: www.cusm.edu
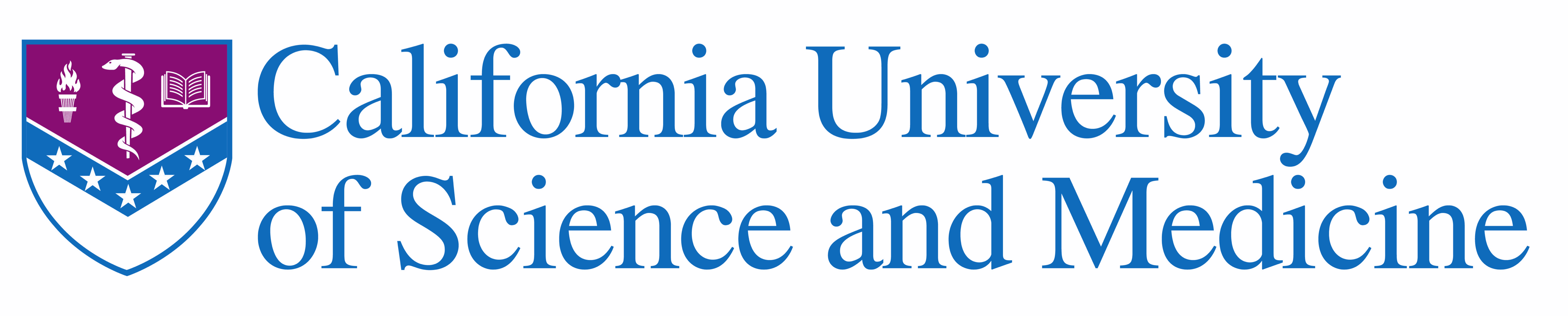

The California University of Science and Medicine (CUSM) is a non-profit private accredited medical school located in Colton, San Bernardino County, United States. CUSM received full LCME accreditation in February 2026.

== History ==
The California University of Science and Medicine (CUSM) was founded as a non-profit medical school in 2015 by Prem Reddy, a cardiologist and owner of Prime Healthcare (PH). PH is a for-profit healthcare organization which as of 2025 owns 44 hospitals. The stated goal of establishing the school was to assist in addressing the physician shortage problem in the United States. In 2014 the Prime Healthcare Foundation (PHF), the non-profit arm of PH, donated $40 million dollars to establish the CUSM. That amount later increased to more than $60 million dollars with additional funds being provided by the Dr. Prem Reddy Family Foundation.

The medical school opened in 2018 and is located in the inland empire, a medically underserved area. The new CUSM campus, completed in 2020, has two lecture halls, nine college rooms, 15 clinical skills rooms and three labs. More than 2,400 students applied to CUSM's inaugural class. The school awarded its first medical degrees to a class of 64 physicians on May 21, 2022.

The California University of Science and Medicine currently is affiliated with Arrowhead Regional Medical Center as the primary teaching hospital. Many of the students at the school attend on scholarships provided by the Dr. Prem Reddy Family Foundation.

== See also ==
- University of California
- List of colleges and universities in California
