= Prime Healthcare =

American healthcare company

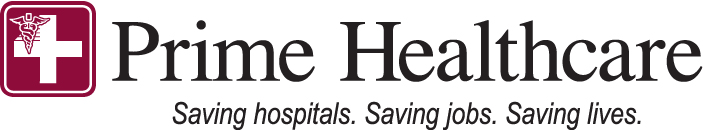
- Type: Privately held company
- Industry: Health care
- Founded: 2001; 25 years ago
- Headquarters: Ontario, California, U.S.
- Number of locations: 55 hospitals (2026)
- Areas served: Alabama, California, Georgia, Illinois, Indiana, Kansas, Michigan, Missouri, Nevada, New Jersey, Ohio, Pennsylvania, Maine, Rhode Island and Texas
- Key people: Prem Reddy, (founder, chairman & CEO); Kavitha Bhatia, (president and chair)
- Products: Health care services
- Number of employees: 60,000 (2025)
- Subsidiaries: Prime Healthcare Foundation
- Website: primehealthcare.com

Prime Healthcare is an American for-profit healthcare company headquartered in Ontario, California, United States. It was established in 2001 by chairman and CEO Prem Reddy, and in 2026 operated 55 hospitals in 15 states.

== History ==
Prime Healthcare Services began in 1985 when Prem Reddy founded Desert Valley Medical Group in Victorville, California. In 1992, Reddy established Primecare Medical Group, and two years after he started building Desert Valley Hospital in Victorville.

In 1998, PrimeCare Medical Group and Desert Valley Medical Group were sold to PhyCor, a Tennessee‑based publicly traded company. In 2001, Reddy founded Prime Healthcare Services and reacquired Desert Valley Hospital.

Between 2005 and 2012, Prime Healthcare acquired a number of hospitals in California, including Chino Valley Medical Center, Sherman Oaks Hospital, Montclair Hospital Medical Center, and Huntington Beach Hospital.

The company also acquired a number of hospitals between 2013 and 2020 in other locations across the United States, including Lower Bucks Hospital in Pennsylvania, Saint Mary's Regional Medical Center in Reno, Nevada, and St. Mary's General Hospital in Passaic, New Jersey.

On March 1, 2025, Prime Healthcare acquired eight Chicago-area hospitals and seven senior living and care facilities from Ascension. Several of these acquisitions were actually by Prime Healthcare's not-for-profit operating subsidiary, Prime Healthcare Foundation.

== Operations ==
In 2026, Prime Healthcare operated 55 acute care hospitals in 15 states. The hospital network has over 60,000 employees and physicians and more than 8,700 patient beds. Prime Healthcare's corporate headquarters is in Ontario, California. 21 of Prime Healthcare's hospitals operate under the Prime Healthcare Foundation, a 501(c)(3) nonprofit public charity.

== Controversies ==
=== 2000s ===
In 2007, the Los Angeles Times alleged that the policies of Prime HealthCare Services resulted in higher-than-average profits for the possible cost of patient care: "When Reddy's company, Prime Healthcare Services Inc., takes over a hospital, it typically cancels insurance contracts, allowing the hospital to collect steeply higher reimbursements. It has suspended services—such as chemotherapy treatments, mental health care and birthing centers—that patients need but aren't lucrative.... On four occasions since 2002, inspectors have found that Prime Healthcare facilities failed to meet minimum federal safety standards, placing their Medicare funding at risk."

In 2008 the State of California and Kaiser Permanente each sued Prime Healthcare over its balance billing practices, and Kaiser obtained an injunction preventing Prime from continuing the practice. Prime had cancelled agreements with insurance companies when it acquired hospitals, leaving patients in an out-of-network situation resulting in higher costs, and has been aggressively pursuing patients including sending unpaid costs to collection agencies. This was the first of several suits between Prime and Kaiser. In June 2010 Kaiser sued Prime Healthcare for "trapping patients" and contended that the company needlessly admitted emergency department patients, rather than transfer them to Kaiser facilities and then sending their insurance companies highly inflated bills. Prime counter-sued Kaiser and the Service Employees International Union, claiming that Kaiser owed it $100 million in unpaid medical claims and that Kaiser and the union conspired to keep Prime out of the market; that suit was dismissed in 2012, and Prime appealed all the way to the US Supreme Court, which declined to hear the case in 2016. In 2015 both parties agreed to drop their lawsuits and resolve them through confidential and binding arbitration.

=== 2010s ===
In 2010 Prime Healthcare came under investigation by the US Department of Health and Human Services and the California Department of Justice about a reported spike in sepsis. The investigation centered around whether the spike in sepsis represented a large public health issue or multimillion-dollar Medicare fraud. Six Prime hospitals ranked in the 99th percentile of US hospitals for sepsis and five were in the 95th percentile. In 2011 Prime Healthcare Service had high rates of kwashiorkor among its elderly patients. At Shasta Regional Medical Center, Prime reported 16.1% of its Medicare patients suffered from kwashiorkor, but California's average for Medicare patients was 0.2%. In 2011 California Watch reported that Prime Healthcare had a practice of transferring high numbers of patients from its emergency department to its hospital beds, specifically with patients on Medicare. Some families described being trapped by doctors at Prime facilities and were unable to see their own doctor at another facility. Former Prime employees have described an orchestrated campaign of admitting Medicare and Kaiser patients, moving them from the emergency department to a hospital bed, in the interest of changing the fortune of a money-losing hospital. In September 2011, California Attorney General Kamala Harris rejected the approval of the sale of the Victor Valley Global Medical Center in Victorville, California, and stated that the sale would not be in the public interest.

In 2012, two executives at Prime Healthcare Services disclosed a patient's chart to multiple media outlets without the patient's written consent. The release was in response to a California Watch article on Prime Healthcare Services billing practices at Shasta Regional Medical Center, which included claims by Darlene Courtois about her treatment by Shasta. Randall Hempling, the hospital CEO, and Marcia McCampbell, its chief medical officer, showed up at the offices of the Redding Record Searchlight and successfully convinced the paper's editor not to publish an article, echoing the California Watch claims by reference to Courtois' actual medical records.

In May 2016 the US Department of Justice joined a qui tam case against Prime Healthcare and its chief executive concerning Medicare fraud. The case was settled in August 2018 for $65 million, resolving the "allegations that 14 Prime hospitals in California knowingly submitted false claims to Medicare by admitting patients who required only less costly, outpatient care and by billing for more expensive patient diagnoses than the patients had (a practice known as "up-coding")". An additional case was settled in February 2019 for $1.25 million for similar allegations regarding two Prime hospitals in Pennsylvania.

=== 2020s ===
In July 2021 the US Department of Justice announced another settlement with Prime Healthcare and Reddy concerning kickbacks, overcharging for medical implants, and billing for a non-eligible provider by using another provider's billing identity. Reddy paid $1,775,000, and Prime $33,725,000.

In 2024, a California federal judge ruled in favor of Prime Healthcare Services in a lawsuit regarding management of its employees' 401(k) plan after a five-day trial. Judge Josephine Staton found "no credible evidence" that Prime's investment monitoring process fell below industry standards.

The case involved a class action by Prime employees who challenged the company's selection of target date funds and recordkeeping expenses in their retirement plan. The ruling dismissed all claims against Prime Healthcare, which operates hospitals and clinics across 14 states.
