= Prem Reddy =

Indian-American cardiologist and businessman

Prem N. Reddy (born 1 June 1948) is an Indian cardiologist and an owner of Prime Healthcare Services, Inc.

== Life and career ==
Reddy was born in a rural village called Baddevolu village and grew up in Nidiguntapalem village Nellore district in southern India. He graduated from Sri Venkateswara University Medical College in 1973. In 1976 Reddy and his wife immigrated to the United States.

Reddy's, who holds an MD, FACC, and FCCP, is a board-certified physician in internal medicine and cardiology. Reddy is no longer licensed to practice medicine in California.

=== Healthcare management and entrepreneurship ===
In the early 1980s, Reddy founded Desert Valley Medical Group in Victorville, CA and established Primecare Medical Group in 1992.

In 1989, Reddy founded the Desert Valley Charitable Foundation, later renamed to the Dr. Prem Reddy Family Foundation, with an initial gift of $1 million. It serves the health care needs of the High Desert communities, such as by including a free public health library, a scholarship program for students in the health care field, and the support of other health care related charities.

Dr. Prem Reddy, MD, founded the California University of Science and Medicine (CUSM) in 2015.

== Controversy ==
On 8 July 2007, the Los Angeles Times ran a news story that alleged that the policies of Prime HealthCare Services, Inc. resulted in higher than average profits at the possible cost of patient care. According to the Times story,

When Reddy's company, Prime Healthcare Services Inc., takes over a hospital, it typically cancels insurance contracts, allowing the hospital to collect steeply higher reimbursements. It has suspended services—such as chemotherapy treatments, mental health care and birthing centers—that patients need but aren't lucrative.... On four occasions since 2002, inspectors have found that Prime Healthcare facilities failed to meet minimum federal safety standards, placing their Medicare funding at risk.

In 2005, two former nurses at Desert Valley Hospital won a lawsuit in which they claimed they were improperly fired after they accused hospital management of providing inadequate care to save money and Reddy of repeatedly reporting to work while under the influence of alcohol. In February 1999, Reddy was arrested for allegedly attacking Harry Lifschutz at Desert Valley Medical Group. Reddy jumped over a desk in the doctor's waiting room and allegedly attempted to choke him and take a laptop from Lifschutz's office.

Prime Healthcare Services was investigated by the United States Department of Health and Human Services and the California Department of Justice about concerns over a reported spike in sepsis. The investigation centers around whether the spike in sepsis represents a large public health issue or potential Medicare fraud. Six Prime hospitals ranked in the 99th percentile of U.S. hospitals for sepsis and five were in the 95th percentile.

In 2016, the U.S. Department of Justice filed a complaint alleging that Prime Healthcare, under the direction of its President and CEO Prem Reddy, deliberately increased hospital admission rates among Medicare beneficiaries without medical necessity. According to the complaint, Reddy instructed physicians to consider patients’ insurance coverage when deciding on admissions and eliminated the “observation status” option for Medicare patients. The DOJ claimed that Reddy personally pressured and reprimanded emergency department doctors for not meeting admission quotas, reportedly set between 20 and 30 percent, and encouraged the admission of patients for minor ailments such as colds or back pain. The government further alleged that Prime altered industry guidelines to justify higher admission rates, leading to millions of dollars in inflated reimbursements. The investigation followed a whistleblower lawsuit and an FBI probe into Prime’s operations, which began in 2011.

In 2018, Prem Reddy have agreed to pay the United States $65 million to settle allegations that 14 Prime hospitals in California knowingly submitted false claims to Medicare by admitting patients who required only less costly, outpatient care and by billing for more expensive patient diagnoses than the patients had. Reddy paid $3,250,000 and Prime paid $61,750,000.

In 2019, Prem Reddy was ordered to pay $1.25 million to the U.S. government to settle allegation that two Prime hospitals in Pennsylvania, Roxborough Memorial Hospital and Lower Bucks Hospital, submitted false claims to Medicare. The hospitals were accused of admitting patients for unnecessary overnight stays and billing for more expensive diagnoses than appropriate, a practice known as up-coding.

In July 2021 US Department of Justice announced another settlement with Prime Health Care and Prem Reddy concerning kickbacks, overcharging for medical implants, and billing for a non-eligible provider by using another provider's billing identity. The violations directly implicated Dr. Reddy in the kickbacks. Reddy paid $1,775,000; and Prime paid $33,725,000.

== See also ==
- Prime Healthcare Services
- Kavitha Bhatia
